= Kragujevac =

Kragujevac Крагујевац (Serbian)
- City
- Град Крагујевац; Grad Kragujevac; City of Kragujevac
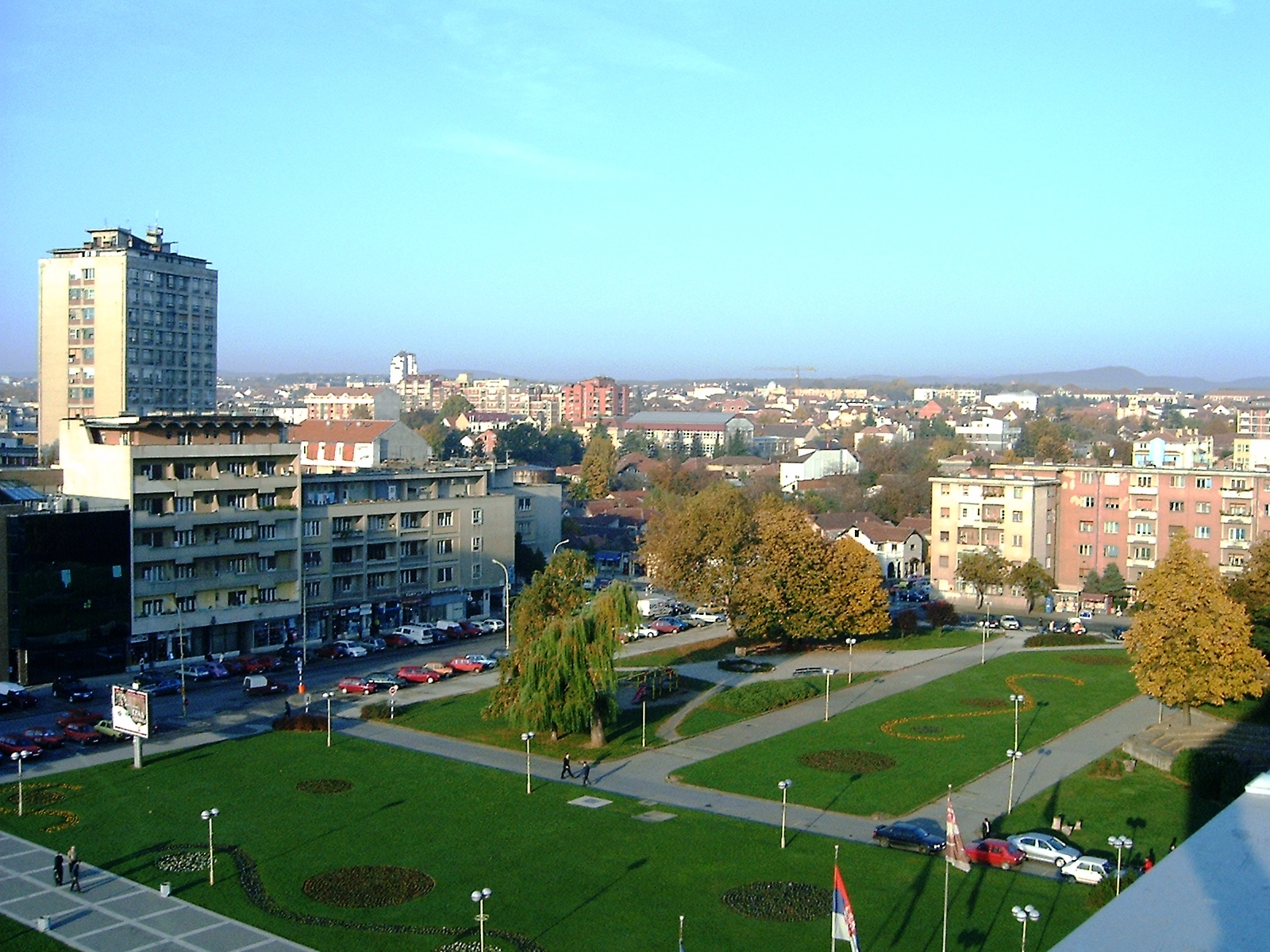
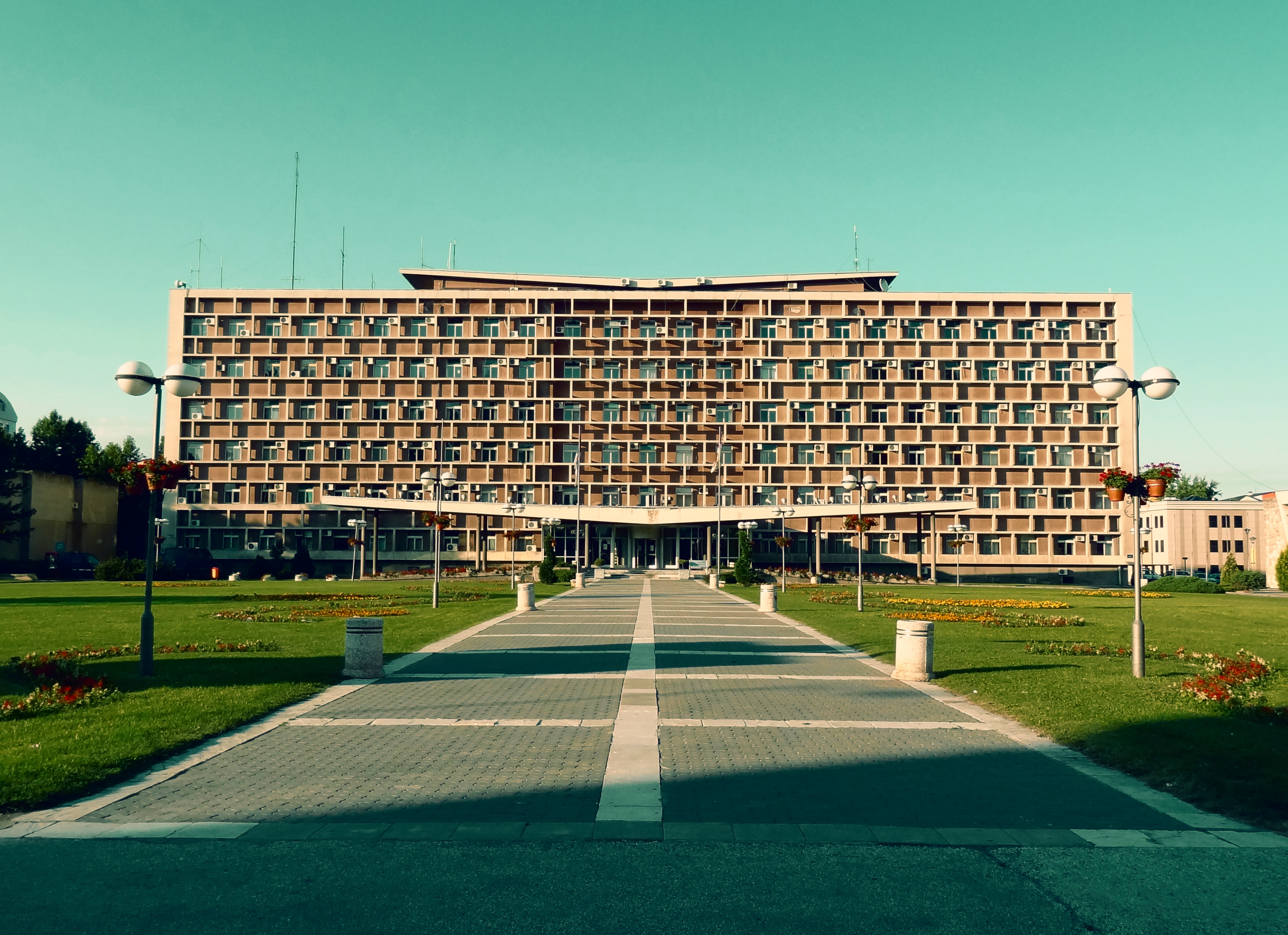
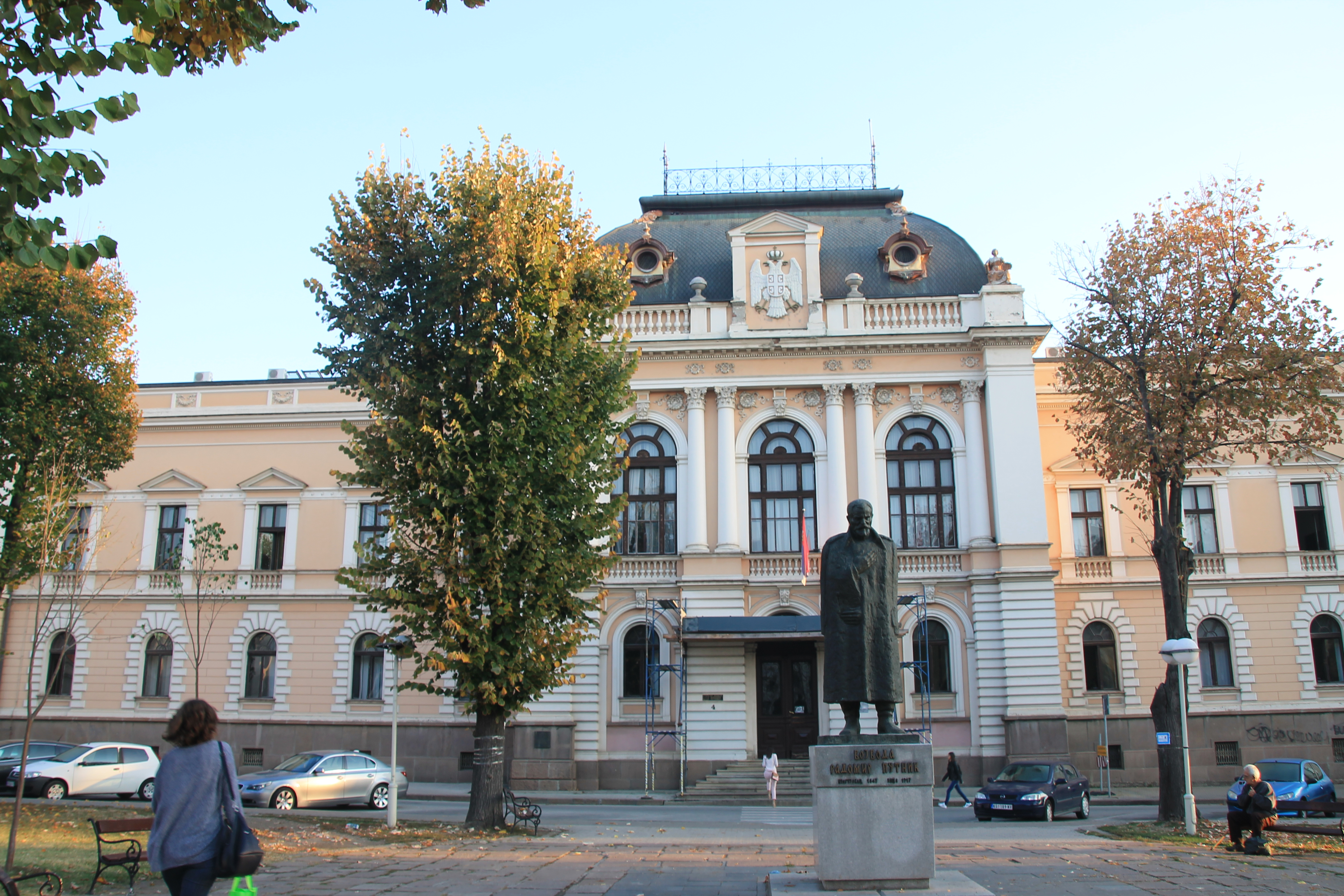
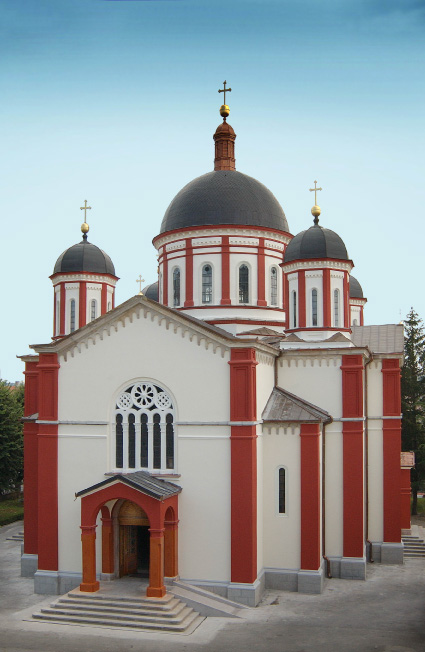
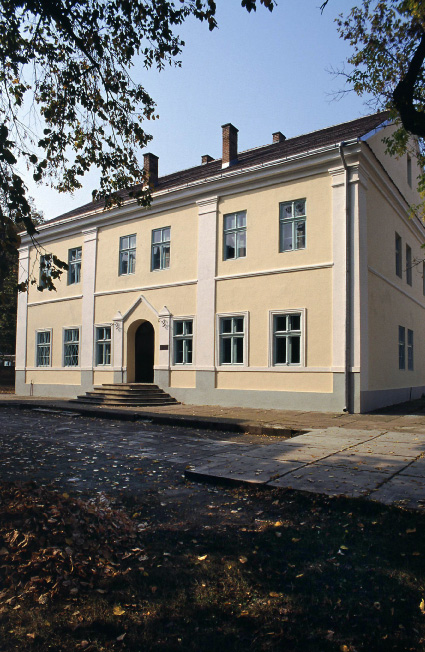
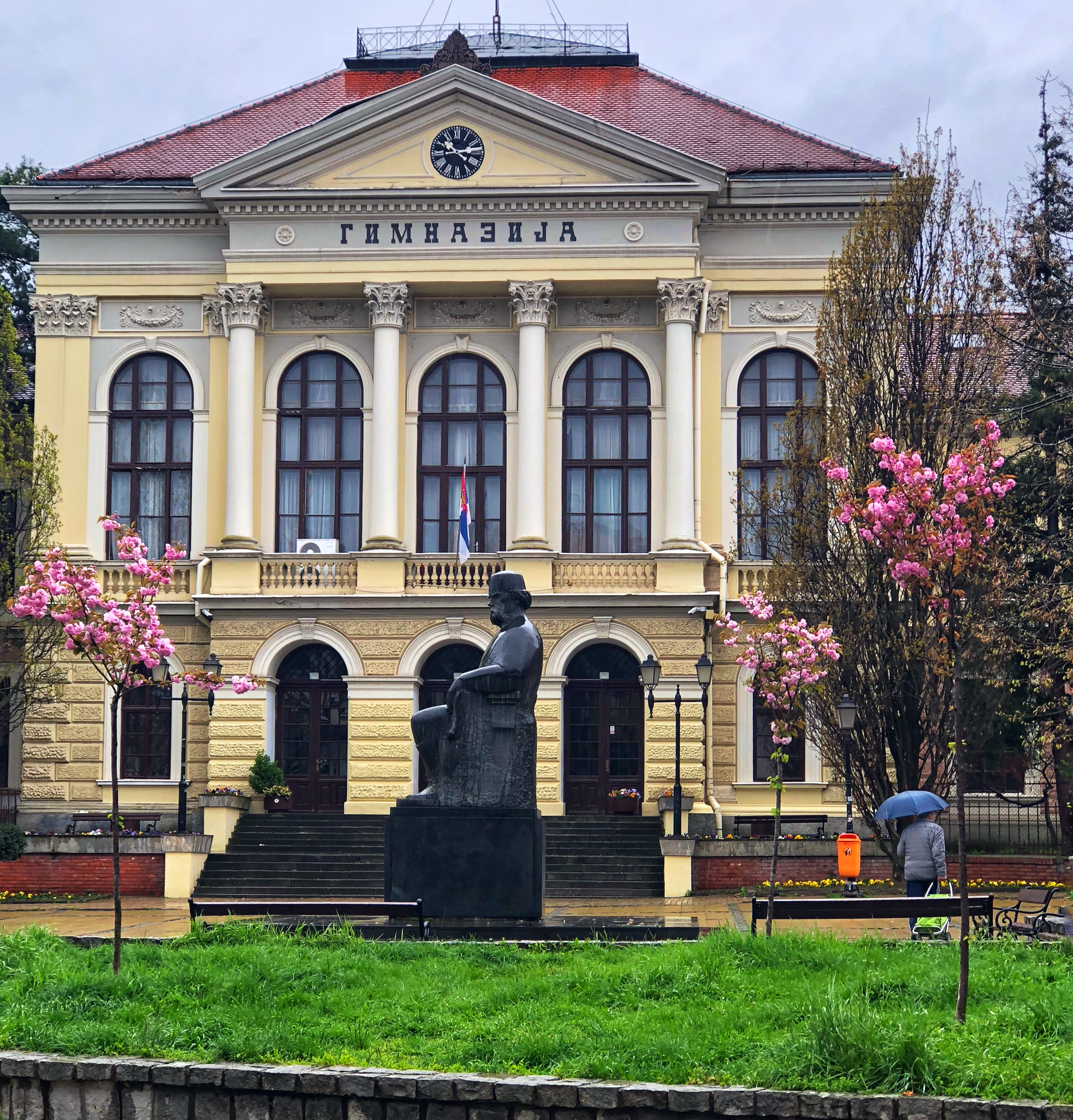
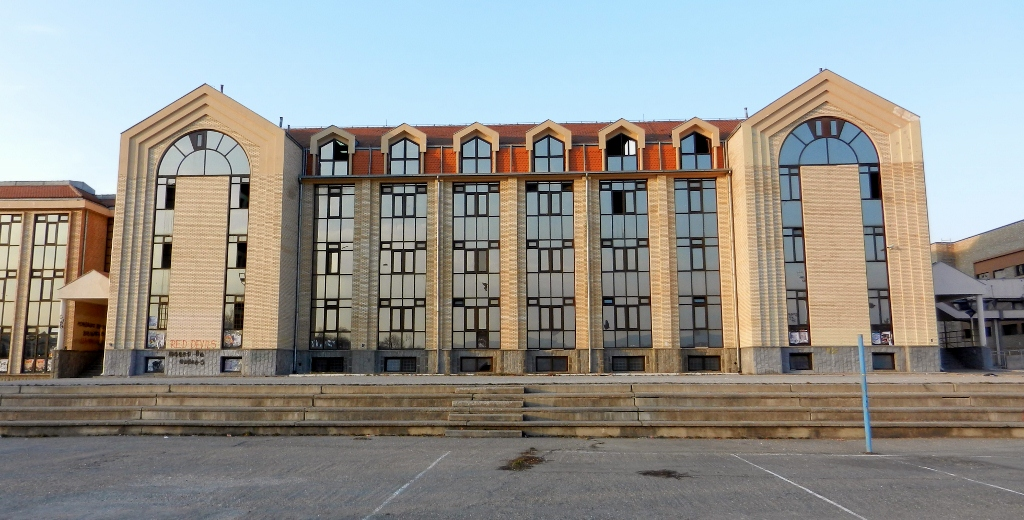
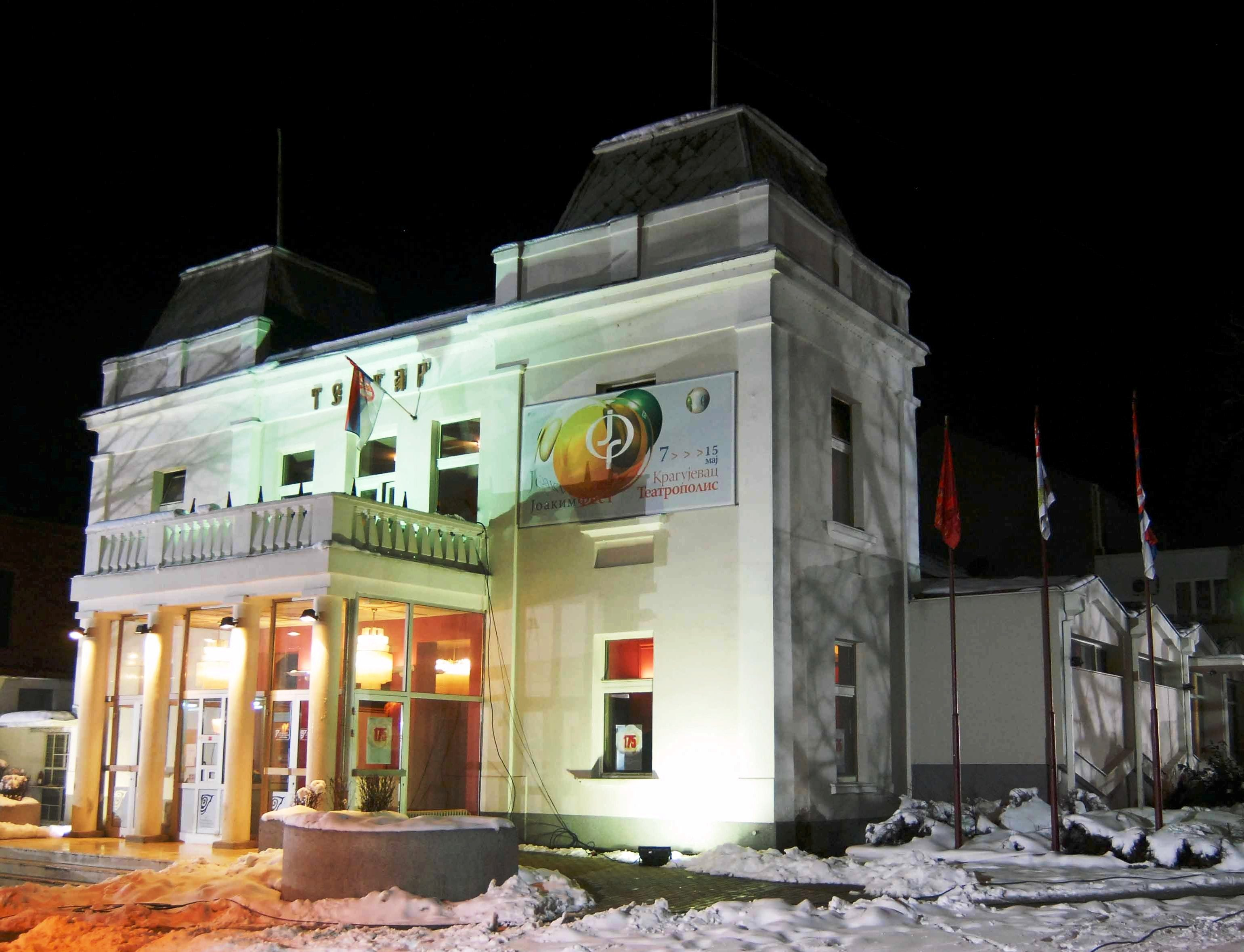
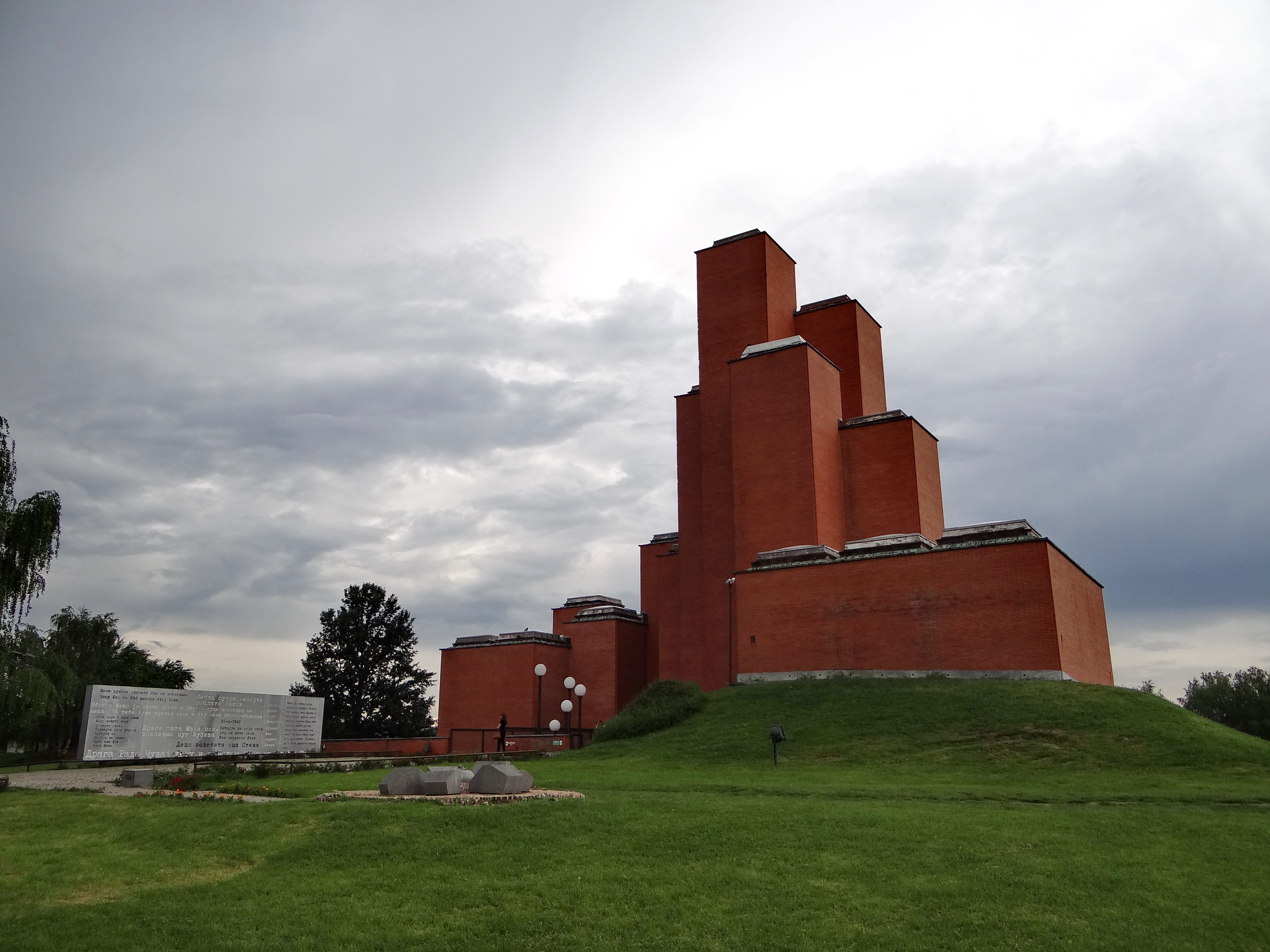
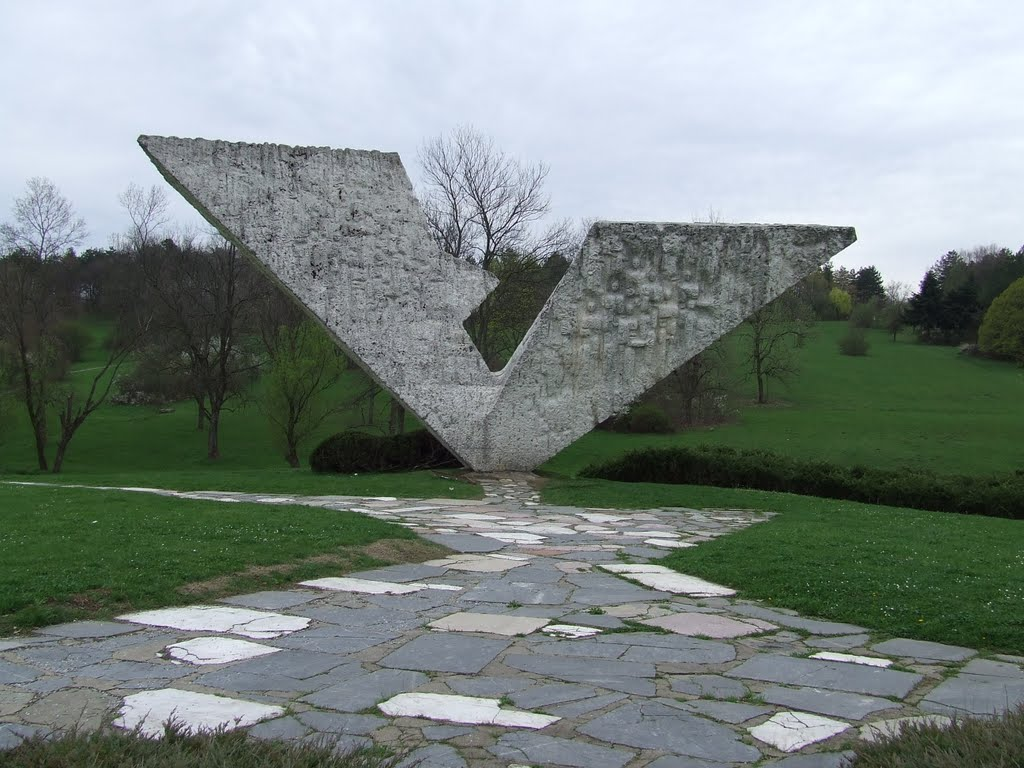
- Panorama of Kragujevac City Assembly Building District Court Cathedral of Dormition of Theotokos National Museum of Kragujevac First Grammar school of Kragujevac Second Grammar school of Kragujevac Princely Serbian Theatre The 21 October Museum "Interrupted Flight" monument

- Flag Seal

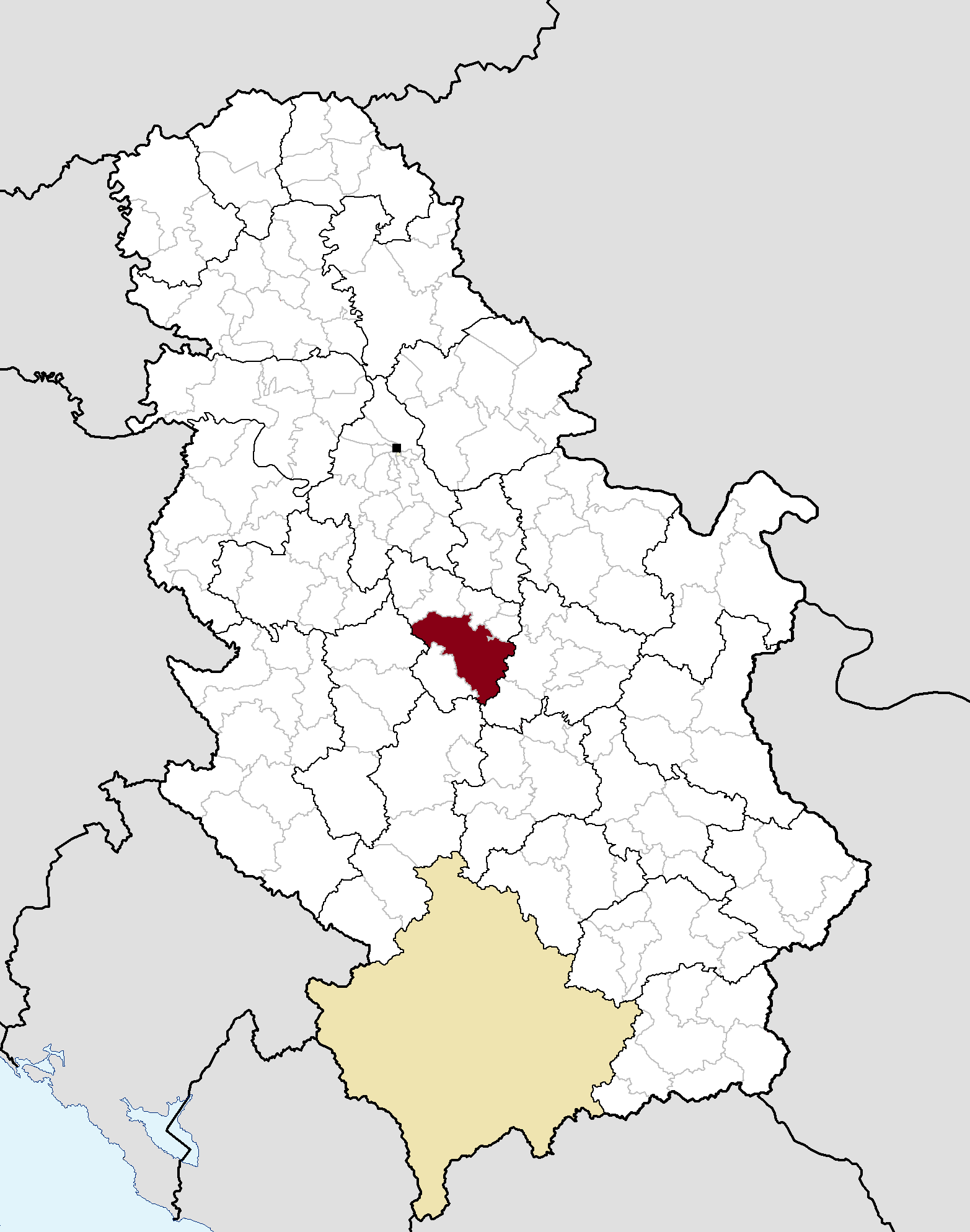
- Location of Kragujevac within Serbia.
- Coordinates: 44°00′36.3″N 20°55′1.9″E
- Country: Serbia
- Region: Šumadija and Western Serbia
- District: Šumadija
- Founded: before 1476

Government
  - Mayor: Nikola Dašić (SNS)

Area
  - Rank: 22nd in Serbia
  - Urban: 82.83 km^{2} (31.98 sq mi)
  - Administrative: 835 km^{2} (322 sq mi)
- Elevation: 173 m (568 ft)

Population (2022 census)
  - Rank: 4th in Serbia
  - Urban: 146,315
  - Urban density: 1,766/km^{2} (4,575/sq mi)
  - Administrative: 171,186
  - Administrative density: 205/km^{2} (531/sq mi)
- Time zone: UTC+1 (CET)
  - Summer (DST): UTC+2 (CEST)
- Postal code: СРБ-34 000
- Area code: +381 34
- ISO 3166 code: SRB
- Licence plates: KG
- Official languages: Serbian
- Website: www.kragujevac.rs

Kragujevac (Serbian Cyrillic: Крагујевац, pronounced [krǎɡujeʋats]) is the fourth largest city in Serbia and the administrative centre of the Šumadija District. It is the historical centre of the geographical region of Šumadija in central Serbia, and is situated on the banks of the Lepenica River. According to the 2022 census, the city itself has a population of 146,318 while the city administrative area has 171,186 inhabitants.

Kragujevac was the first capital of modern Serbia and the first constitution in the Balkans, the Sretenje Constitution, was proclaimed in the city in 1835. A unit of the Scottish Women's Hospitals for Foreign Service was located there in World War I. During the Second World War, Kragujevac was the site of a massacre by the Nazis in which 2,778 Serb men and boys were killed.

Modern Kragujevac is known for its large munitions (Zastava Arms) and automobile (Fiat Serbia) industries, as well as its status as an education centre housing the University of Kragujevac, one of the region's largest higher education institutions.

== Etymology ==
The name Kragujevac comes from 'kraguj' the Serbian name for cinereous vulture. In the Middle Ages, this bird was common in the woods of the area, and was used for hunting. The city's name means 'kraguj's tower', and the bird is represented on the city's coat of arms.

== History ==
=== Early and medieval ===
Over 200 archaeological sites in Šumadija confirm that the region's first human settlement took place around 40,000 years ago during the Paleolithic era. The Jerina cave, located near the village of Gradac in the direction of Batočina, is dated to have been inhabited from around 37,000 BP to 27,000 BP. Dugouts dated to 5,000 BC have been found in the city's vicinity, in the localities of Grivac, Kusovac, Divostin, Donje Grbice and Dobrovodica. These remains belong to the Neolithic Starčevo culture, which, in this area, spread along the river valleys of Lepenica and Gruža. The best known artifacts are the fertility figurines called Divostinke ("Girls from Divostin").

At the time of Roman conquest in 9 AD, the territory of the present-day city was largely inhabited by Illyrians (mainly the Dardani) and Celts (the Scordisci). By the late 6th and early 7th centuries, large-scale Slavic raids and settlement began, along with invasions from Hunnic and Germanic tribes. Later, the area would become part of the First Bulgarian Empire. With the weakening of both the Bulgarian and Eastern Roman empires, Stefan Nemanja, Grand Prince of the consolidated medieval Serbian state, captured the territory between 1198 and 1199. Although it is hypothesized that the current area of the city was densely settled by the time of Stefan Nemanja's conquest, it does not appear in medieval Serbian documents.

The first written mention of the city was in an Ottoman cadastral survey (defter) in 1476 after the city's incorporation into the Sanjak of Smederevo. Referred to as 'Kraguyfoça', the settlement, after Ottoman conquest, consisted of a square formerly used as a market with 32 houses. The surrounding region was largely empty; even the forests that once dominated the region had been burned. By the end of the same century, however, the Ottoman administration began to slowly resettle the city's area; by the 1536 cadastral survey, the town had 7 Muslim neighborhoods (mahalas) with 56 houses in total, along with a Christian community of 29 houses. On the left bank of the Lepenica, a mosque was erected.

=== Habsburg-Ottoman conflict and major revolts ===
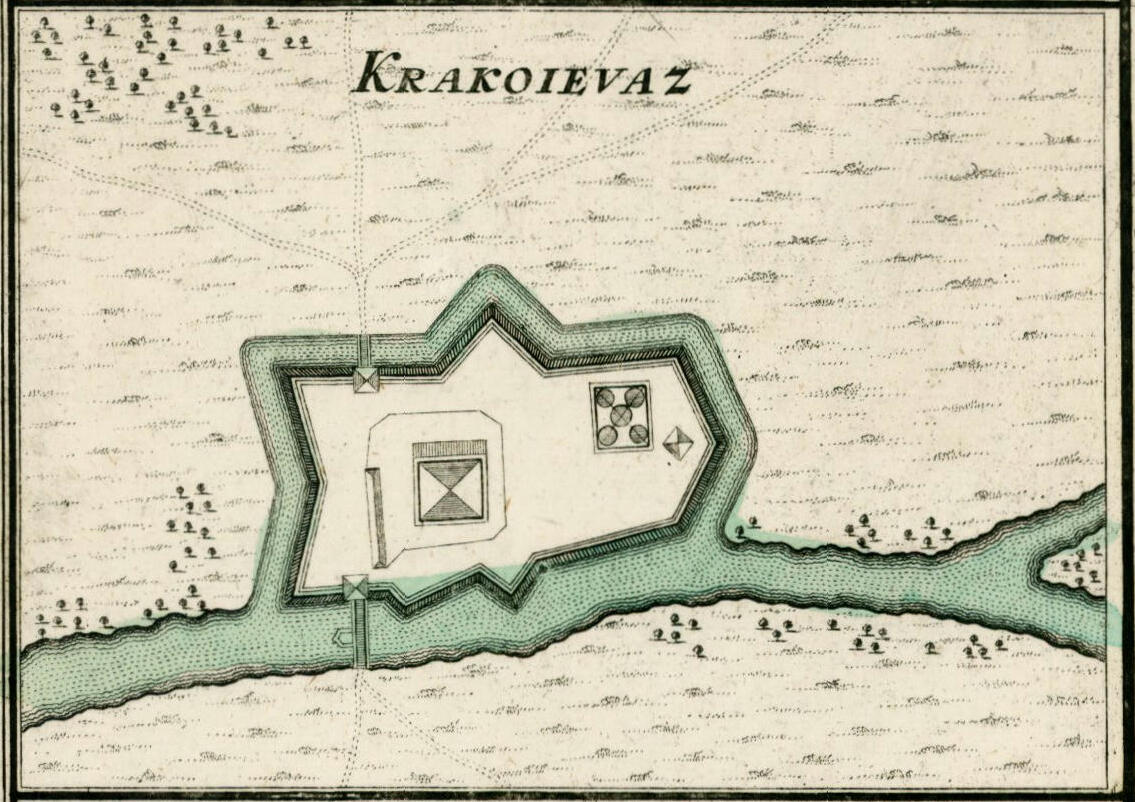
A map of the Habsburg-era Kragujevac fortress surrounded by a moat, 1738

In spite of its newfound consolidation under Turkish rule, the town's location in strategic borderland between the Habsburg monarchy and the Ottoman Empire made it an area of frequent conflict in the modern era. During the Great Turkish War, the Austrians, under Louis of Baden, pushed the Turks far to the south of the city. Although this occupation was short-lived, it spelled an end to consolidated Ottoman rule in the region. Soon after, in 1718, Kragujevac became a part of the Habsburg Kingdom of Serbia following conquest by Prince Eugene of Savoy and the signing of Treaty of Passarowitz.

Under Austrian occupation, Kragujevac was fortified, the Muslim population was driven out and it became a hajduk town. It was exclusively inhabited by Serbian Orthodox members of the national militia with their families. As one of the districts lying right on the Ottoman border, moreover, it was controlled by an hajduk company (of the fourteen that guarded the frontier) and found itself under military jurisdiction. Accordingly, its chief was a Serbian military officer, First Captain Staniša Marković Mlatišuma, the second highest authority of the Serbian militia. In 1725 the first officially recorded cases of vampirism occurred in Kragujevac, in which two alleged vampires were accused of murdering 42 people. In other parts of Habsburg ruled Kingdom of Serbia similar cases followed after which the Serbian word vampir entered German and later other world languages. As the Ottomans retook the town in 1739, and lost it again in 1789 to the same enemy, the town was ripe for new rule—this time under Serbian rebels.

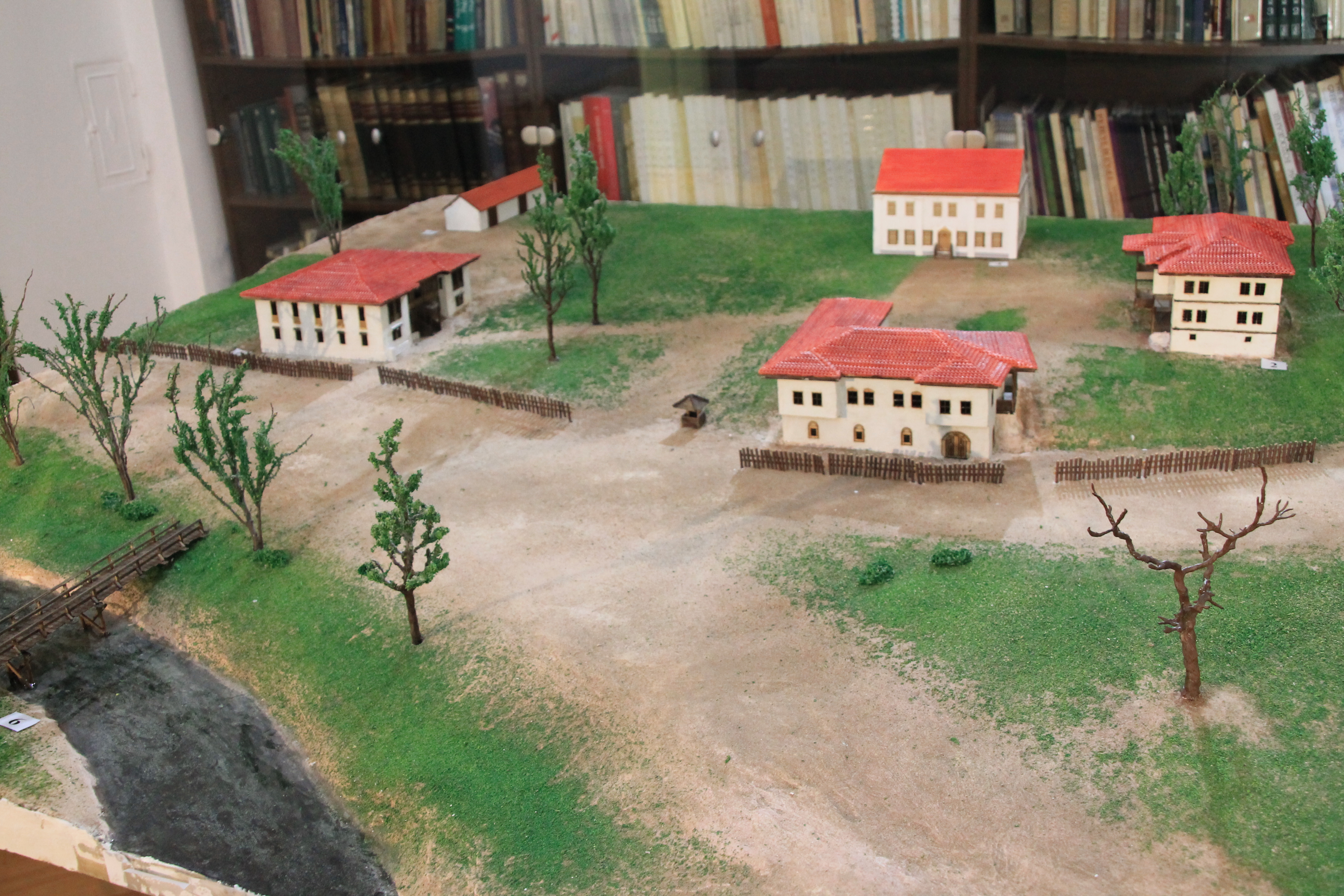
A scale model of royal complex founded by Miloš Obrenović

As a settlement central to the Sanjak of Smederevo under Ottoman rule, Kragujevac was of utmost strategic importance to its agitating, largely rural Serb inhabitants. Therefore, it became a centre of the Serbian Revolution, a national awakening of Serbs led by the grand vožd, Karađorđe. First liberated on 5 April 1804 during the First Serbian Uprising, the city was finally freed from imperial rule during the Second Serbian Uprising in 1815.

In 1818, Kragujevac, though largely depopulated following the conflicts of the preceding centuries, was proclaimed capital of the Principality of Serbia on 6 May 1818 by Miloš Obrenović in the medieval Vraćevšnica monastery. To mark the occasion, he built the Royal residence on the left bank of the Lepenica river. Amidža Konak is the only remaining building from the complex and the only landmark of 19th century Ottoman architecture in the city. The first institutions of the Principality of Serbia were founded in Kragujevac including the first courthouse, First gymnasium (grammar school) and the Princely Serbian theatre. The first Serbian constitution, the Sretenje Constitution, was proclaimed in the city on 15 September 1835. It was one of the most liberal European constitutions of its time, modeled on the French and Belgian constitutions.

=== Industrial development ===
Although the capital was moved from Kragujevac to Beograd (Belgrade) in 1841, the importance of Kragujevac only increased during the remainder of the 19th century as it grew into a city marked by its industry. Following centuries of economic underdevelopment, the underpinnings of the city's modernization—and Serbia's main munitions manufacturer, Zastava Arms—were laid in the commissioning of the city's foundry complex in 1835. Known under its Serbian acronym VTZ, the complex was completed in 1850, and the first cannon was cast in 1853. Colloquially styled the 'Knez's arsenal', its first director, Charles Loubry, was a French engineer authorized to take over this duty by the Emperor of France, Napoleon III.

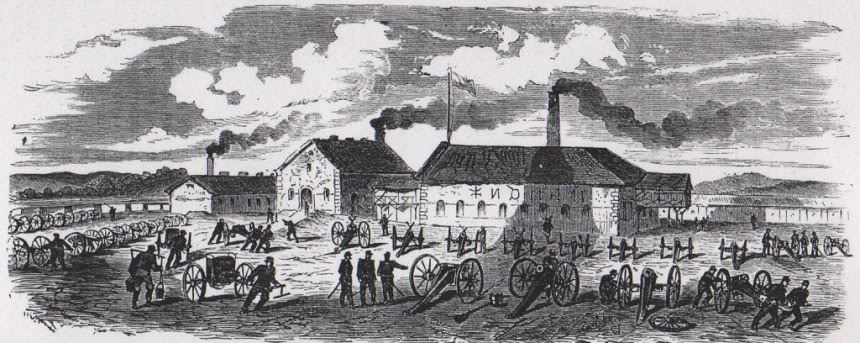
The Kragujevac cannon foundry in its working days as part of the VTZ

Following the creation of the VTZ, industrial development continued at an unprecedented pace. The first telephone exchange was installed in 1858, and in 1868 the first industrial brewery was opened by Nikola Mesarović. The first printing press was founded in 1870. To connect the city's burgeoning military industry as well as its production of iron ploughs to the rest of Serbia's regions, the Belgrade–Niš railroad was built in 1886. To serve its industrial population, Serbia's first grammar school (gimnazija), the city's first pharmacy, and its first cinema, located in a local kafana, were all built during the remainder of the 19th century, along with Kragujevac's Great (or Upper) Park and, in 1891, its first regulatory urban plan. The city's industrialism characterized it among its European peers, along with its workers' demonstrations, known as the Crveni barjak ('Red banner') demonstrations, first held on 27 February 1876. Today, the beginnings of the town's industry, the now-defunct VTZ, have been recognized by the Serbian government as vital to Serbia's cultural heritage and, as of 2017, consists of 151 individual objects, of which 31 are protected as unique heritage, including the old foundry, the machine workshop, the chimney, the fire lookout tower, the railroad bridge over the Lepenica River, and the cartridge factory. Once known by its non-industrial residents as the 'Forbidden City' (Zabranjeni Grad), the complex is now open to the public.

=== World War I ===
During World War I, Kragujevac again became the capital of Serbia (1914–1915), and the seat of many state institutions—the Supreme Army Command was housed within the courthouse building.

A unit of the Scottish Women's Hospital for Women's Service was based there from December 1914 to November 1915. A list of those working in the hospital can be viewed on the website "Imperial War Museum: Lives of the First World War " and more information on these units is below.

During the war, Kragujevac lost around 15% of its population. On the night of 2 June 1918, a group of occupying Slovak soldiers from the Austro-Hungarian 71st infantry regiment mutinied in the city centre. The soldiers, led by Viktor Kolibík, had recently returned from captivity in Russia and were to be immediately deployed to the Italian Front. The mutiny failed, and 44 mutineers were executed.

=== Yugoslavia ===
Following World War I, Kragujevac became a part of the Kingdom of Serbs, Croats, and Slovenes, later renamed the Kingdom of Yugoslavia. In the period before the Second World War, the city continued its cultural and economic development with the founding of the Gundulić Theatre and the Kragujevac Academic Theatre as well as a number of new factories.

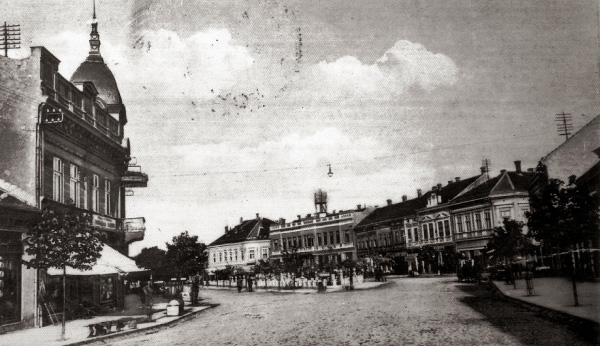
King Peter's Street

Following the Nazi invasion of Yugoslavia, the city came under direct Nazi occupation. After a joint Partisan-Chetnik attack on German forces in nearby Gornji Milanovac, Generalfeldmarschall Wilhelm Keitel calculated that 50 people were to be shot for every German soldier wounded and 100 people were to be shot for every German soldier killed. Franz Böhme therefore ordered the deaths of nearly 2,800 men and boys between 19 and 21 October 1941 in the Kragujevac massacre. The dead included a class from the city's First Gymnasium; today, a monument to the executed pupils is the symbol of the city. The massacre inspired a poem titled Krvava Bajka (A Bloody Fairy Tale) by Desanka Maksimović.

The city was liberated from Nazi Germany on 21 October 1944.

In the post-war period, Kragujevac continued to develop its industry. Its main products were passenger cars, trucks and industrial vehicles, hunting arms, industrial chains, leather, and textiles. The biggest industry was Zastava Automobiles, which at one point employed tens of thousands people.

The first product of the Zastava Automobiles car company, the FIAT 750, was manufactured in 1955 under a licence to Fiat Automobiles (now Fiat Serbia). In the following three decades, more than five million passenger cars (FIAT 750, Zastava 1300, Zastava 101, Zastava 128, Zastava Yugo, Yugo Florida, Fiat 500L) were manufactured and marketed in 74 countries worldwide. Perhaps most famous among the automobiles produced is the Yugo, also marketed as the Zastava Korral.

The city's industry greatly suffered under international economic sanctions during the Milošević era in the 1990s, and some parts were reduced to rubble in the 1999 NATO bombing of FR Yugoslavia.

=== Kragujevac today ===
The city today remains an industrial heart of Serbia, and has grown with the influx of students and refugees from the Yugoslav wars. In 2010, the city government signed a memorandum with the German development agency GIZ and in 2012 city hall adopted a strategy of urban development of the central city zone to be completed by 2030. As of December 2017, many objects within the complex deteriorated and the right bank of the Lepenica is urbanistically neglected. The authenticity and representative values of the complex must be preserved, but where it is allowed, the industrial and workers quarters will be transformed into the residential and commercial areas, traffic corridors and used for the numerous educational and cultural institutions Serbia's industrial city continues to cherish.

== Geography and infrastructure ==
Kragujevac lies 180 metres (591 feet) above sea level. The coordinates of the city are 44°00'36.3 N and 20°55'01.9 E. It is located in the valley of the river Lepenica. The city covers an area of 835 square kilometres (322 sq mi), surrounded by the slopes of the Rudnik, Crni Vrh, and Gledić mountains. Kragujevac is the traditional centre of Šumadija, a region characterized by its rolling hills and fertile orchards.

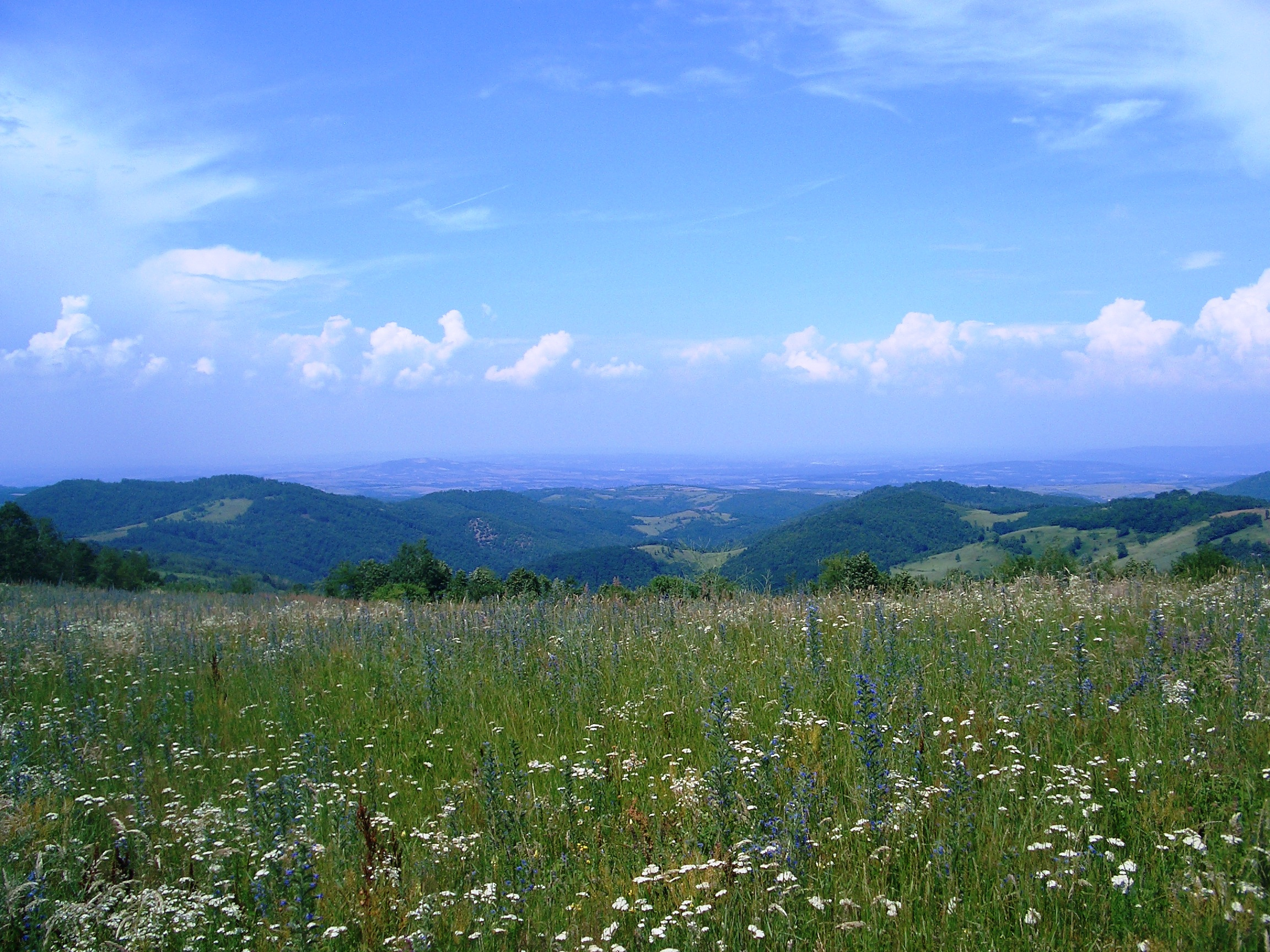
Kragujevac is centre of Šumadija region

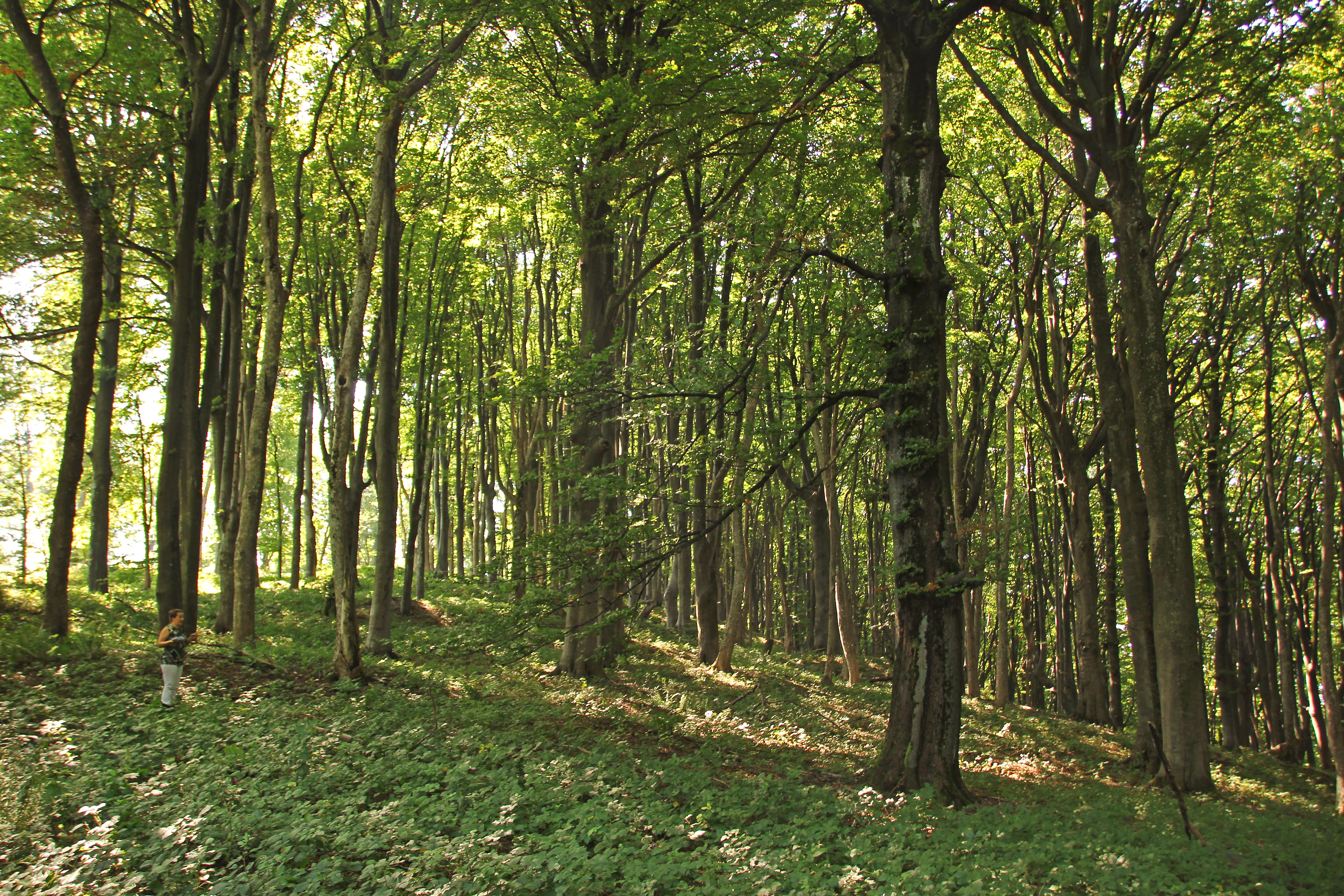
National Reserve Veliki Sturac, Mountain Rudnik

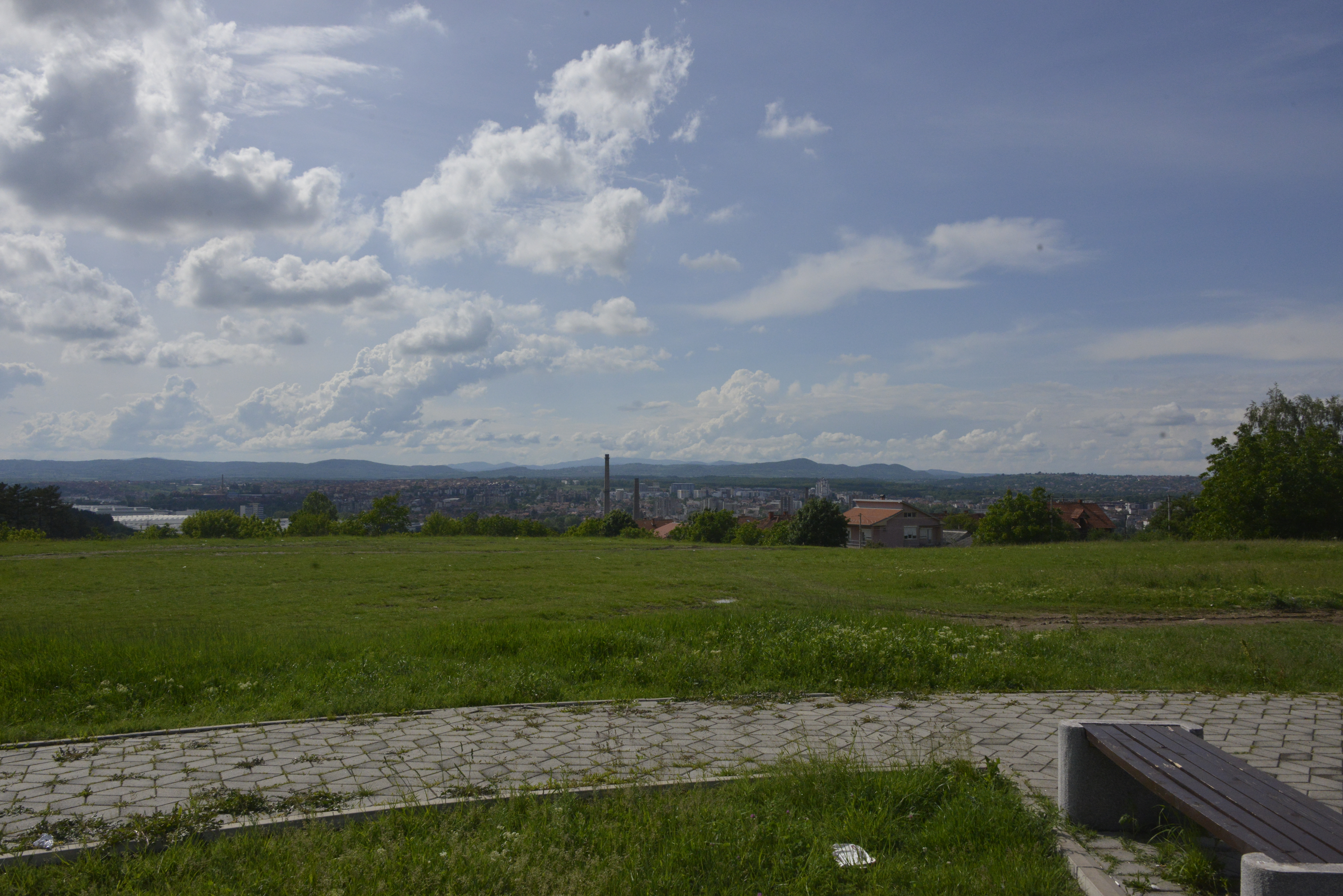
Metino Brdo view

=== Cityscape ===
The architecture of Kragujevac displays a fusion of many different styles. Historically, Ottoman (nowadays almost completely gone) and 19th century Vienna Secession style architecture have played an important role in the city's landscape.

Newer architecture dominates the city's panorama. A blend of Viennese, Balkan as well as Brutalism is present, as showcased in the monuments to the Kragujevac massacre. Post-war concrete apartment blocks built during the Socialist Federal Republic of Yugoslavia period are prominent. Today, glass office buildings reflect the ambitious business aspirations of the city. Some important buildings in Kragujevac include:

- The "old" (or "Pridvorina") church of Descent of the Holy Spirit, built in 1818 as a part of Prince Miloš's court
- The Old Parliament, built in the court of the church where the first parliamentary meeting was held in 1859
- The Amidža Konak, built by Prince Miloš as a residential house (now exhibition) and an example of regional Serbian architecture
- The Prince Mihailo Konak, built in 1860 to blend local tradition with European architectural concepts and now the National Museum
- The grammar school (gimnazija), built between 1885 and 1887 in European style to serve as the first educational institution of its kind in Serbia, educating prominent Serbian figures such as Svetozar Marković, Nikola Pašić, and Radomir Putnik

The Upper (Great) Park is the largest park in Kragujevac. It was established in 1898. It is covered with more than 10 hectares (25 acres) of greenery, and a dense canopy of century-old trees, renovated walkways and benches are the right place for rest, walk and relaxation. In the park and its immediate vicinity there are sports facilities for basketball, football, volleyball, tennis, and indoor and outdoor swimming pools. Lower (Small) Park is located in the city centre, within the Milos Wreath complex. At its centre there is a monument to the Fallen People of Šumadija. The Ilina Voda park, a legacy of Svetozar Andrejević, was established in 1900. It covers an area of 7 hectares (17 acres).

There is a fountain with a small waterfall, five mini lakes connected by a small stream, and a small zoo with about 100 animals and a garden with various types of trees characteristic of Šumadija. The curiosity in the park is the largest sculpture of Easter eggs (3 metres (10 ft) high) in Europe and the second in the world; made from recycled metal, set in 2004. Scenic attractions nearby include the Aranđelovac, Gornji Milanovac, Vrnjačka Banja, and Mataruška Banja, Karađorđe's castle, the Church of Saint George in Topola 40 kilometres (25 miles) away, the Old Kalenić monastery 55 kilometres (34 miles) away, the resorts of Rogot (28 km (17 mi)) and Stragari (34 km (21 mi)) with the old Blagoveštenje and Voljavča monasteries.

View of Kragujevac

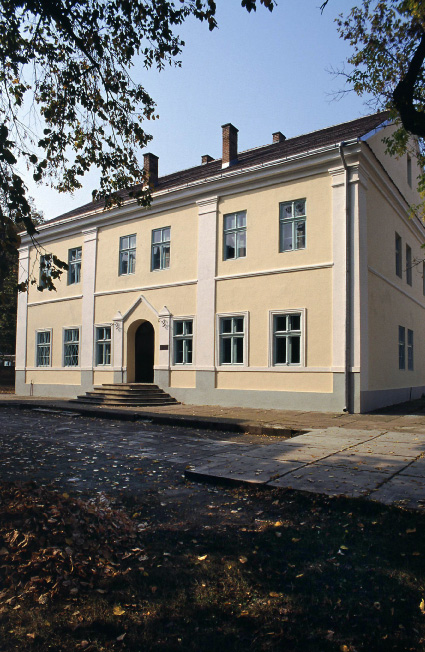
House of prince Mihailo Obrenović III

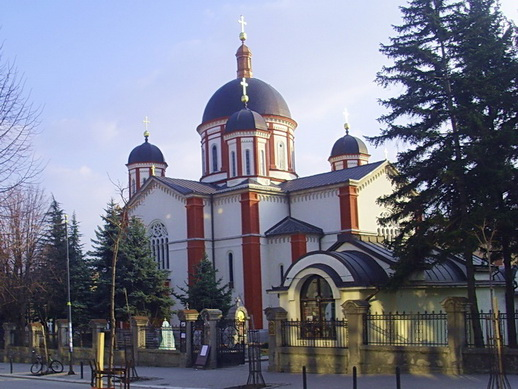
Cathedral of the Dormition of the Theotokos

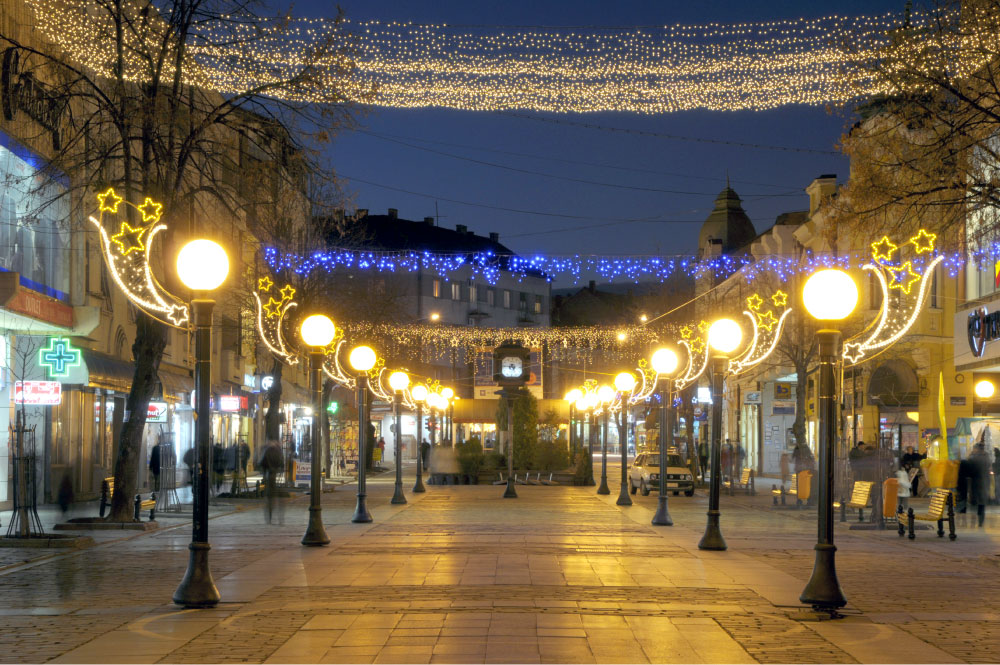
Pedestrian zone

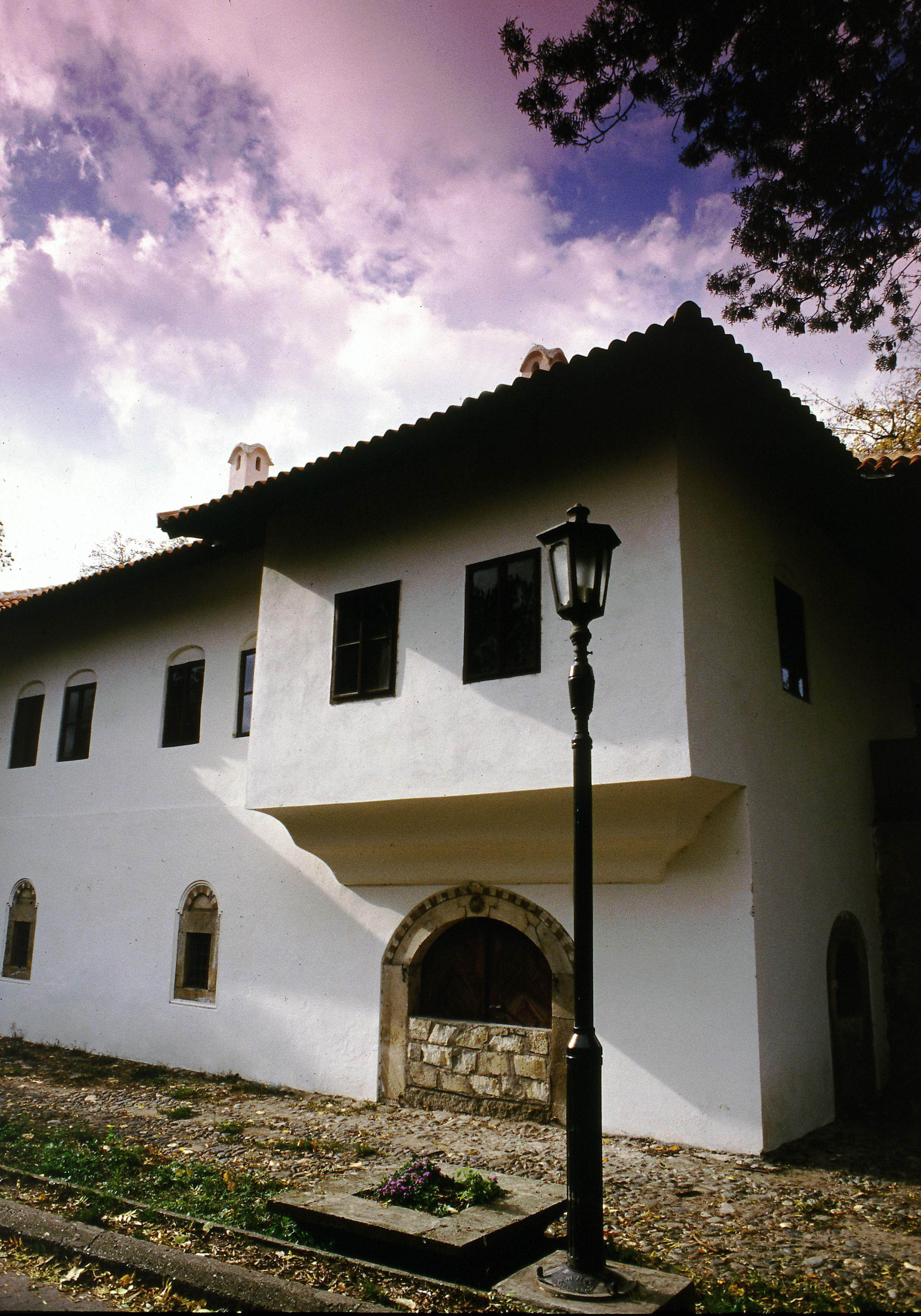
Amidžin Konak

=== Transportation ===
Kragujevac has developed transportation infrastructure, with a variety of road connections to the Serbian capital, Belgrade. It can be reached using Serbian IB-class roads 24 (an expressway) and 25. In the coming years, the city will also be accessible via Pan-European Corridor X or, in Serbia, the A1 motorway. The town is also connected to nearby Jagodina and Gornji Milanovac via class IIA road numbers 170 and 176 (via Bar, Montenegro), respectively.

Kragujevac is connected by bus lines with almost all cities in the country. The most frequent departures (every half-hour) are to Belgrade. The central bus station is about a kilometre away from the city centre. Kragujevac can also be reached by train. The central train station is located close to the central bus station.

The company responsible for public transportation in Kragujevac is the City Traffic Agency (GSA). The integrated public transport is performed by two companies: Arriva Litas and Vulović Transport. There are 22 urban bus lines and 14 lines that connect nearby rural areas operating according to established timetable. There are also 7 taxi and 3 rent-a-car companies operating in Kragujevac. Car parking system with 10 parking lots and zoned street parking (three zones with 4,244 parking spaces) is operated by public service company Parking Service Kragujevac.

=== Climate ===
Kragujevac has a humid subtropical climate (Köppen climate classification: Cfa), and with a July mean temperature of 22.6 °C (72.7 °F). Winds most often blow from southwest and northwest, while they often blow from southeast in January, February and March.

Climate data for Kragujevac (1991–2020, extremes 1961–present)
Month	Jan	Feb	Mar	Apr	May	Jun	Jul	Aug	Sep	Oct	Nov	Dec	Year
Record high °C (°F)	21.8 (71.2)	25.2 (77.4)	29.4 (84.9)	32.0 (89.6)	35.4 (95.7)	39.4 (102.9)	43.9 (111.0)	40.5 (104.9)	37.8 (100.0)	34.7 (94.5)	27.6 (81.7)	21.0 (69.8)	43.9 (111.0)
Mean daily maximum °C (°F)	5.7 (42.3)	8.2 (46.8)	13.1 (55.6)	18.4 (65.1)	23.0 (73.4)	26.9 (80.4)	29.3 (84.7)	29.6 (85.3)	24.3 (75.7)	18.8 (65.8)	12.7 (54.9)	6.5 (43.7)	18.0 (64.4)
Daily mean °C (°F)	1.3 (34.3)	3.0 (37.4)	7.1 (44.8)	12.1 (53.8)	16.7 (62.1)	20.7 (69.3)	22.6 (72.7)	22.3 (72.1)	17.3 (63.1)	12.2 (54.0)	7.4 (45.3)	2.4 (36.3)	12.1 (53.8)
Mean daily minimum °C (°F)	−2.4 (27.7)	−1.3 (29.7)	2.0 (35.6)	6.1 (43.0)	10.5 (50.9)	14.4 (57.9)	15.9 (60.6)	15.6 (60.1)	11.6 (52.9)	7.2 (45.0)	3.3 (37.9)	−0.9 (30.4)	6.8 (44.2)
Record low °C (°F)	−27.6 (−17.7)	−24.4 (−11.9)	−18.3 (−0.9)	−5.8 (21.6)	−0.6 (30.9)	2.7 (36.9)	7.2 (45.0)	4.6 (40.3)	−2.2 (28.0)	−6.6 (20.1)	−16.4 (2.5)	−20.7 (−5.3)	−27.6 (−17.7)
Average precipitation mm (inches)	42.1 (1.66)	40.1 (1.58)	46.6 (1.83)	54.3 (2.14)	70.3 (2.77)	77.2 (3.04)	65.8 (2.59)	56.0 (2.20)	53.6 (2.11)	54.2 (2.13)	44.6 (1.76)	47.0 (1.85)	651.8 (25.66)
Average precipitation days (≥ 0.1 mm)	12.8	12.5	11.6	11.9	13.4	11.3	9.3	7.6	9.7	10.2	10.7	12.8	133.8
Average snowy days	8.5	7.7	3.8	0.7	0.0	0.0	0.0	0.0	0.0	0.1	2.5	6.6	29.9
Average relative humidity (%)	79.5	74.9	68.5	66.6	69.4	67.7	64.2	65.3	70.7	75.4	76.7	80.8	71.6
Mean monthly sunshine hours	71.9	91.3	148.4	184.7	225.7	260.1	293.3	280.2	197.0	148.5	92.5	62.3	2,055.9
Source: Republic Hydrometeorological Service of Serbia

== Municipalities and settlements ==
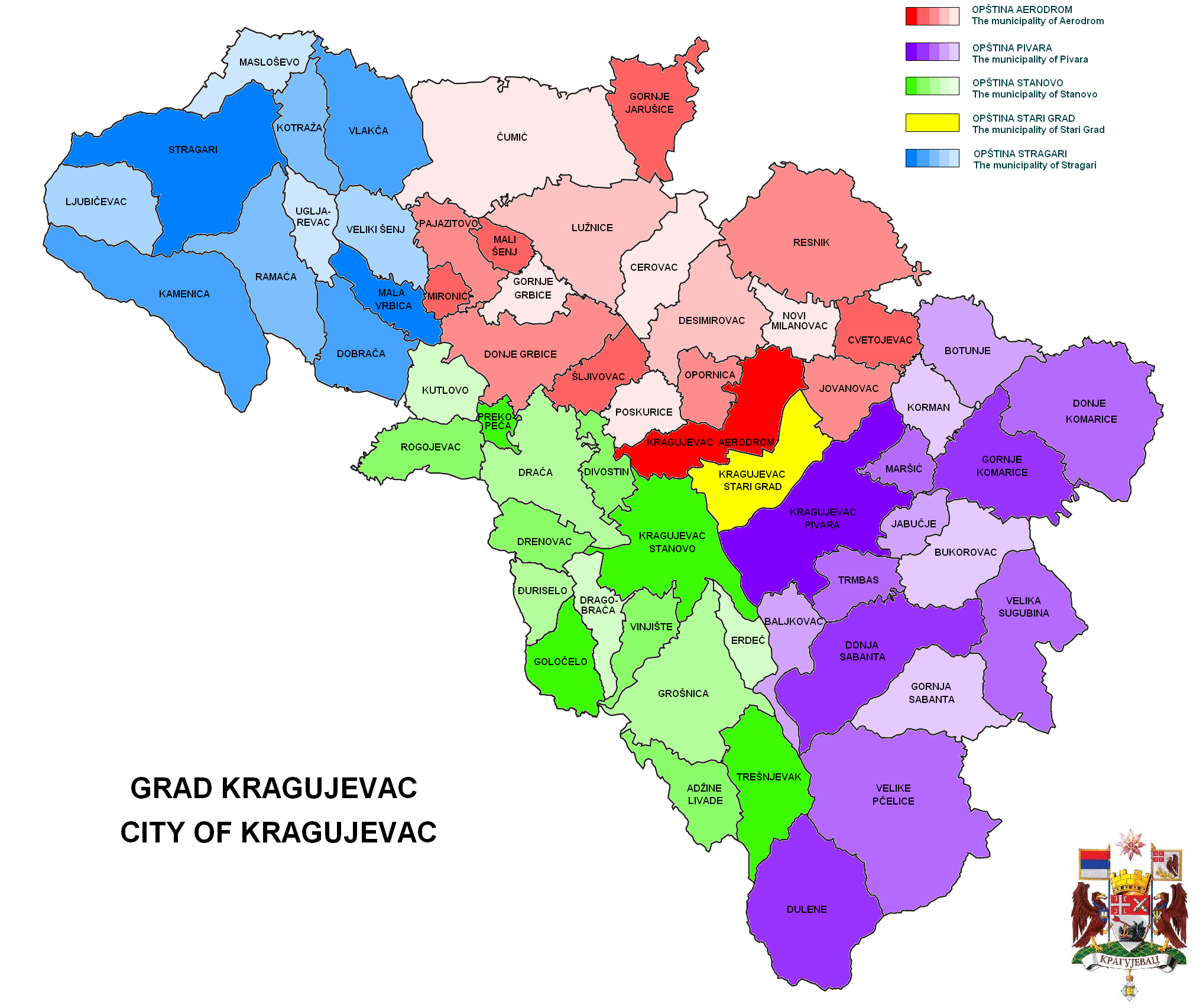
Defunct city municipalities with settlements

Defunct city municipalities

From May 2002 until March 2008, the city of Kragujevac was divided into the following city municipalities:

- Aerodrom
- Pivara
- Stanovo
- Stari Grad
- Stragari

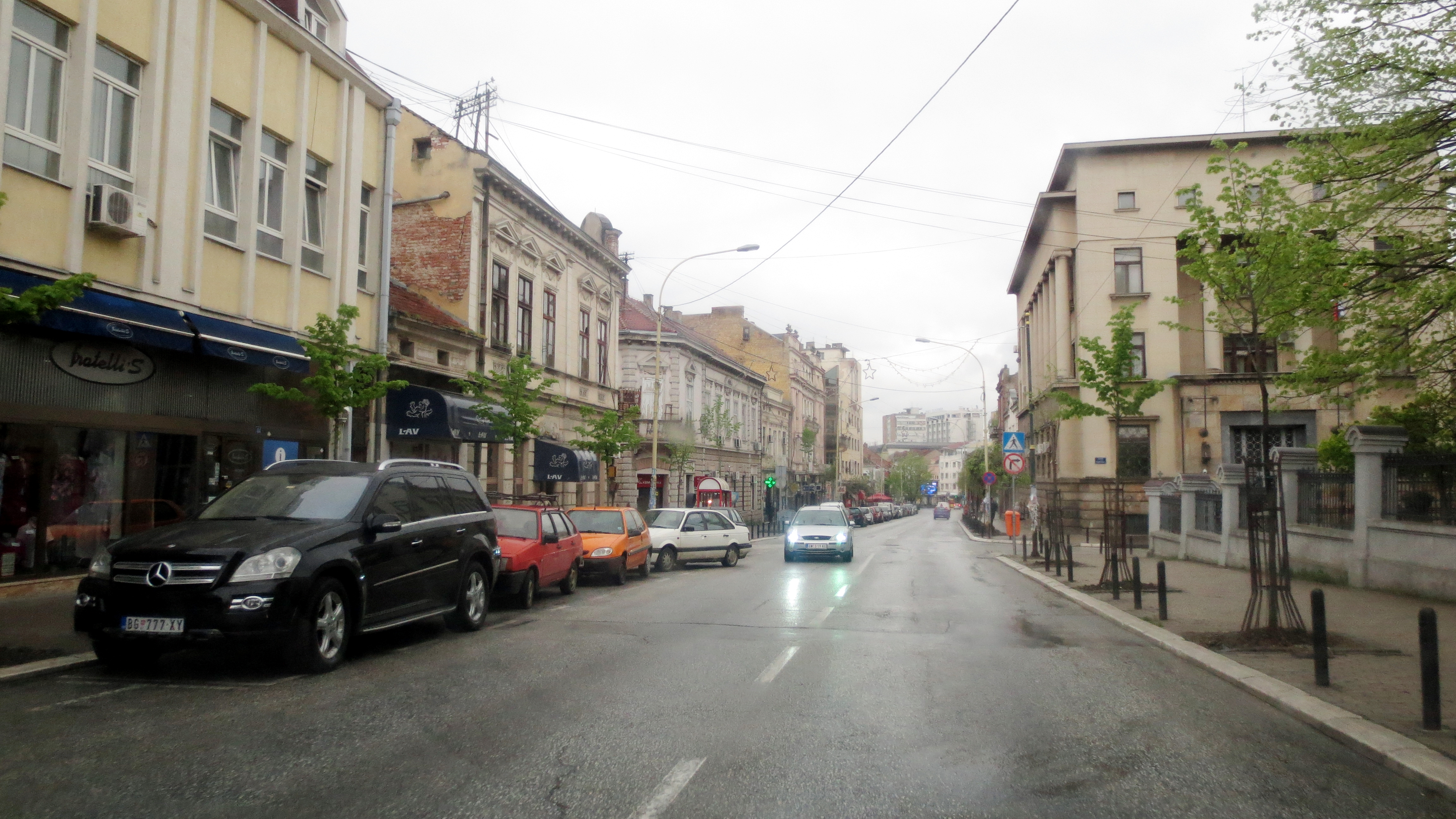
Image from central Kragujevac

Settlements

List of settlements in the city of Kragujevac:

- Adžine Livade
- Baljkovac
- Beloševac
- Botunje
- Bukorovac
- Velika Sugubina
- Velike Pčelice
- Veliki Šenj
- Vinjište
- Vlakča
- Goločelo
- Gornja Sabanta
- Gornje Grbice
- Gornje Jarušice
- Gornje Komarice
- Grošnica
- Desimirovac
- Divostin
- Dobrača
- Donja Sabanta
- Donje Grbice
- Donje Komarice
- Dragobraća
- Drača
- Drenovac
- Dulene
- Đuriselo
- Erdeč
- Erdoglija
- Jabučje
- Jovanovac
- Kamenica
- Korman
- Kotraža
- Kutlovo
- Lužnice
- Ljubičevac
- Mala Vrbica
- Mali Šenj
- Maršić
- Masloševo
- Mironić
- Novi Milanovac
- Opornica
- Pajazitovo
- Poskurice
- Prekopeča
- Ramaća
- Resnik
- Rogojevac
- Trešnjevak
- Trmbas
- Ugljarevac
- Cvetojevac
- Cerovac
- Čumić
- Šljivovac

== Demographics ==
Historical population
Year	Pop.	±%
1948	39,324	—
1953	48,702	+23.8%
1961	63,347	+30.1%
1971	92,985	+46.8%
1981	129,017	+38.8%
1991	147,305	+14.2%
2002	146,373	−0.6%
2011	150,835	+3.0%
2022	146,315	−3.0%

According to the 2022 census results, the city proper has a population of 146,315, while the administrative area has a population of 171,186, 17% more than the city proper.

Around 70% (126,312 inhabitants) are of working age (aged 15 to 64). The employed population in 2014 was 42,148 (47.0% of whom were women), most of whom work in metalworking (22%) and medical and social services (13%). 54.6% of persons older than 15 have only secondary education, while 17.7%% hold a college or university degree.

Around 93% of total city area is covered with water supply system, 78% with sewage system, 72% with natural gas supply network, and 92% with cell phone networks.

=== Ethnic groups ===
Ethnic group	Population 2011	Population 2022
Serbs	172,052	159,305
Romani	1,482	1,444
Yugoslavs	175	286
Montenegrins	645	246
Macedonians	297	189
Croats	192	114
Muslims	97	58
Russians	-	57
Gorani	101	51
Others	4,376	9,436
Total	179,417	171,186

== Politics ==
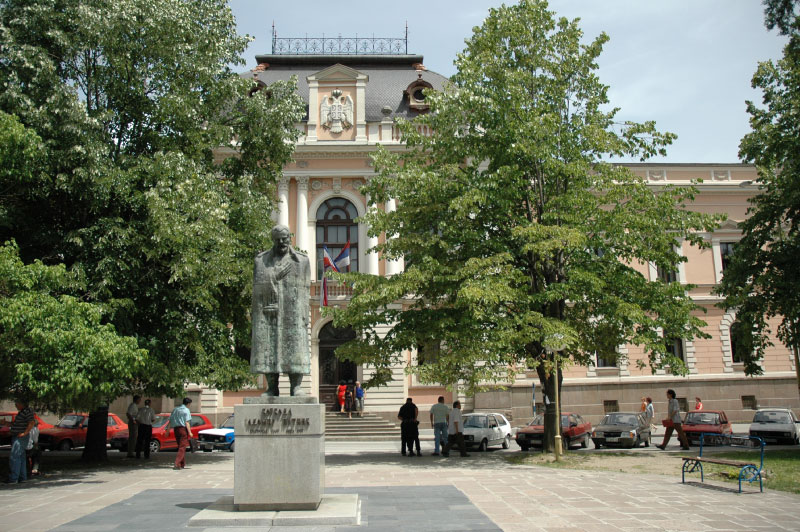
District court

Results of the 2012 local elections (there are 87 seats in local assembly) are the following:

- Together for Šumadija-United Regions of Serbia (37)
- Let's Get Kragujevac Moving (18)
- Democratic Party-Social Democratic Party of Serbia (12)
- SPS-PUPS-JS (10)
- Liberal Democratic Party-Serbian Renewal Movement (5)
- Democratic Party of Serbia (5)

== Economy ==
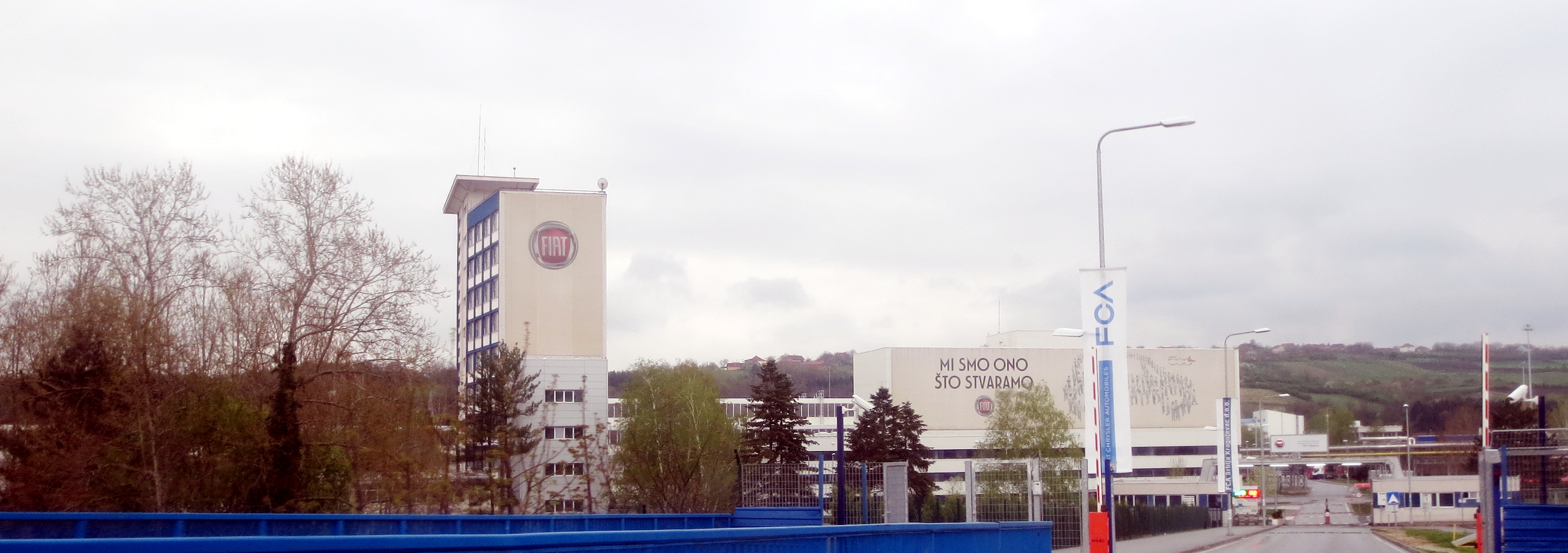
FIAT Chrysler Automobiles Serbia

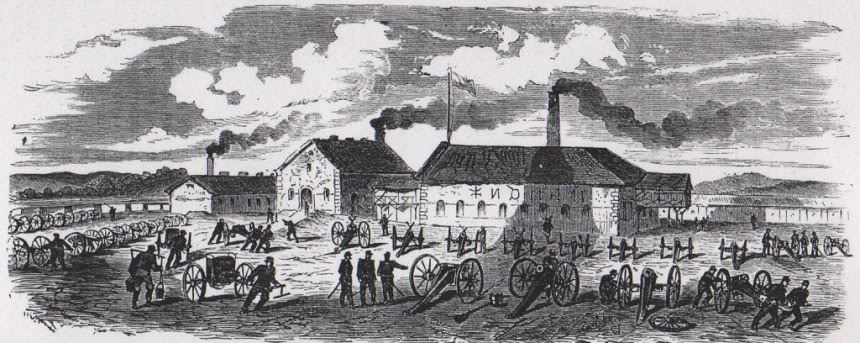
Kragujevac Cannon Foundry in 1856

Kragujevac has been an important industrial and trading centre of Serbia for more than two centuries, known for its automotive and firearms industries. The former state-owned Zastava Automobiles company was purchased by Fiat in 2008, and new company, FCA Srbija, was established. Fiat was joined by partners Magneti Marelli (exhaust systems and control panels), Johnson Controls (car seats and interiors), Sigit (thermoplastic and rubber components) and HTL (wheels).

Weapons manufacturing in Kragujevac began with foundation of the VTZ in 1853 and has since grown to become Serbia's primary supplier of firearms through the Zastava Arms corporation. Today, Zastava Arms exports more than 95% of its products to over forty countries in the world. By the decisions of the Ministry of Defence of Serbia, Zastava Arms became a part of the Defense Industry of Serbia in 2003. The most important partners of Zastava Arms are Yugoimport SDPR, Army and Police of Serbia, Century Arms, and International Golden Group.

Rapp Marine Group (components for ships, oil platforms and machines), Meggle AG (dairy products), Unior Components (broaches, welded construction, thermal treatment), Metro Cash and Carry, Mercator and Plaza centres (retail) established their operations in Kragujevac. Many other local companies provide key manufacturing and production establishments.

According to the National Bank of Serbia, there were 30 commercial banks operating in Serbia as of December 2016, of which Direktna Banka has its headquarters in Kragujevac.

The Kragujevac Fair was established in 2005. It comprises 1,600 square metres (17,222 sq ft) of area dedicated to trade and exhibitions and 1,000 square metres (10,764 sq ft) of area for other activities (administration, Media centre, restaurant etc.).

As of September 2017, Kragujevac contains one of 14 free economic zones established in Serbia.

The following table gives a preview of total number of registered people employed in legal entities per their core activity (as of 2022):

Activity	Total
Agriculture, forestry and fishing	190
Mining and quarrying	27
Manufacturing	16,535
Electricity, gas, steam and air conditioning supply	760
Water supply; sewerage, waste management and remediation activities	1,030
Construction	2,411
Wholesale and retail trade, repair of motor vehicles and motorcycles	8,322
Transportation and storage	2,410
Accommodation and food services	2,172
Information and communication	1,336
Financial and insurance activities	828
Real estate activities	121
Professional, scientific and technical activities	2,365
Administrative and support service activities	1,675
Public administration and defense; compulsory social security	2,715
Education	4,847
Human health and social work activities	5,220
Arts, entertainment and recreation	984
Other service activities	866
Individual agricultural workers	722
Total	55,537

== Society and culture ==
=== Education ===
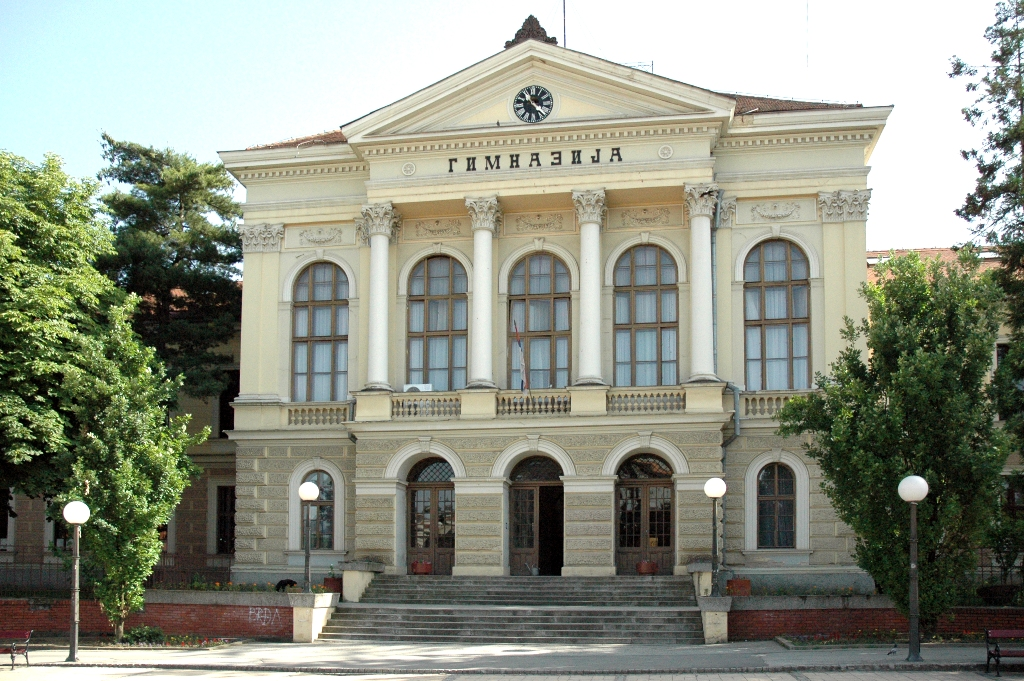
First Kragujevac Gymnasium.

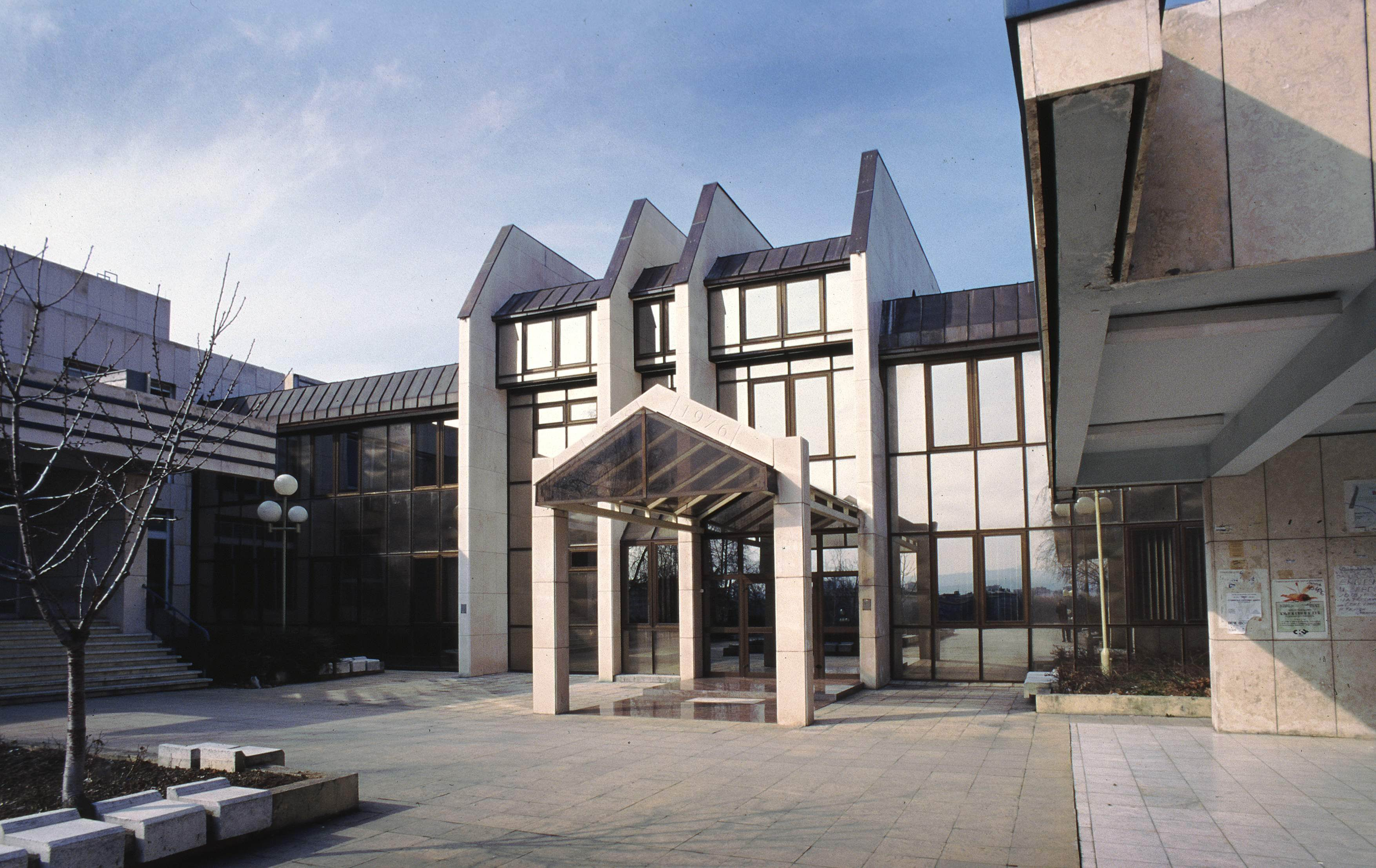
University of Kragujevac.

There are 22 primary and 8 secondary schools in Kragujevac. There are also 3 special schools: a school for hearing impaired children, the music school "Dr Miloje Milojević", and the school for children with disabilities "Vukašin Marković".

The University of Kragujevac was established on 21 May 1976. It is the fourth largest university in Serbia and is organized into 12 faculties and two institutes which are spread over six nearby cities (Kragujevac, Čačak, Kraljevo, Užice, Jagodina and Vrnjačka Banja). Around 16,000 students are currently enrolled at the university. It has around 1,350 employees, out of which 900 are teaching and research staff.

The University Library in Kragujevac is of a generally scientific character, and its primary users are university teaching staff and students. Its area is 1,500 square metres (16,000 square feet) and includes several storage rooms, a reading area and the university gallery. The library keeps around 100,000 copies of books, 2,500 doctoral and master thesis, 450 titles of domestic journals and 105 titles of foreign journals.

=== Culture ===
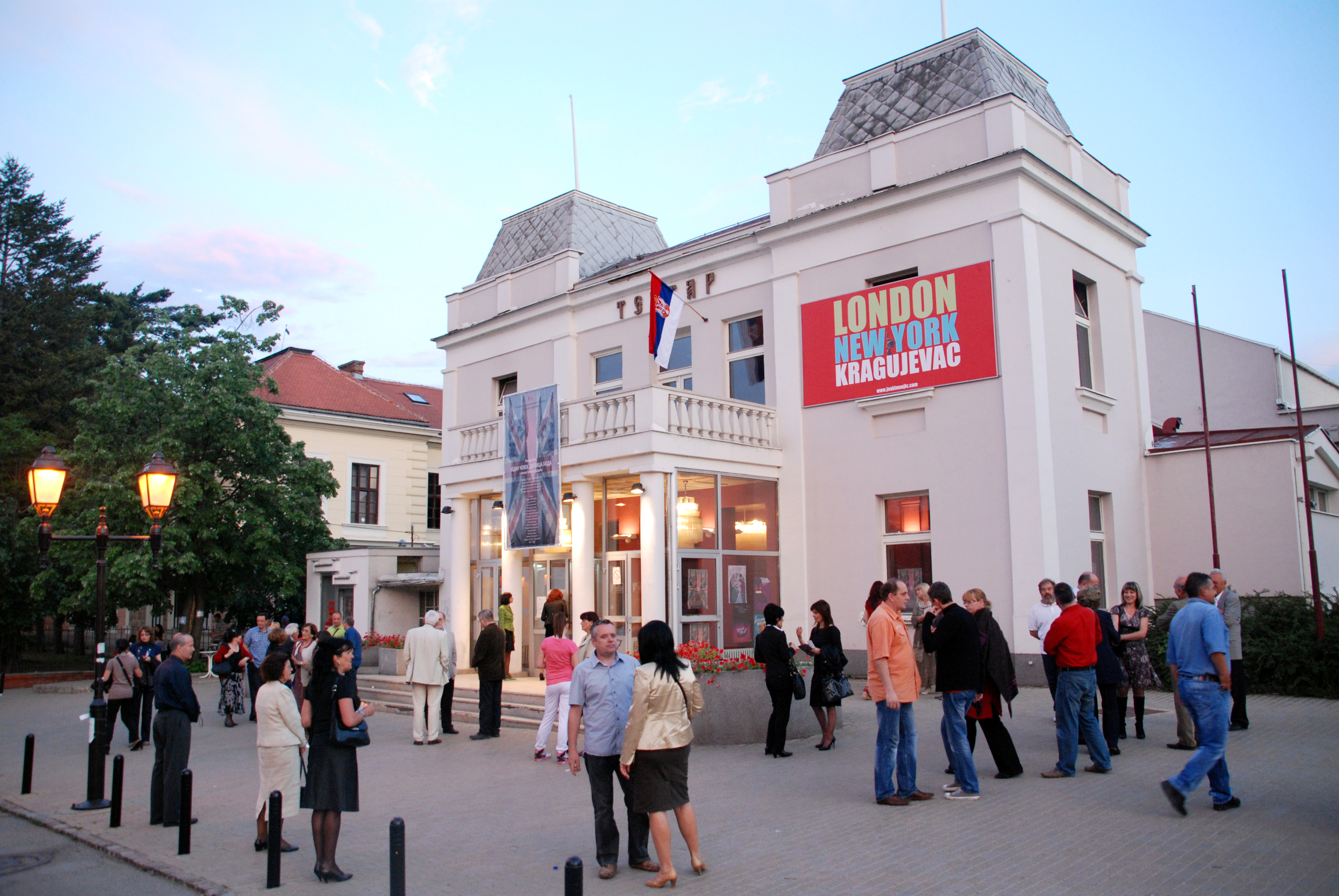
Knjaževsko-srpski Theatre.

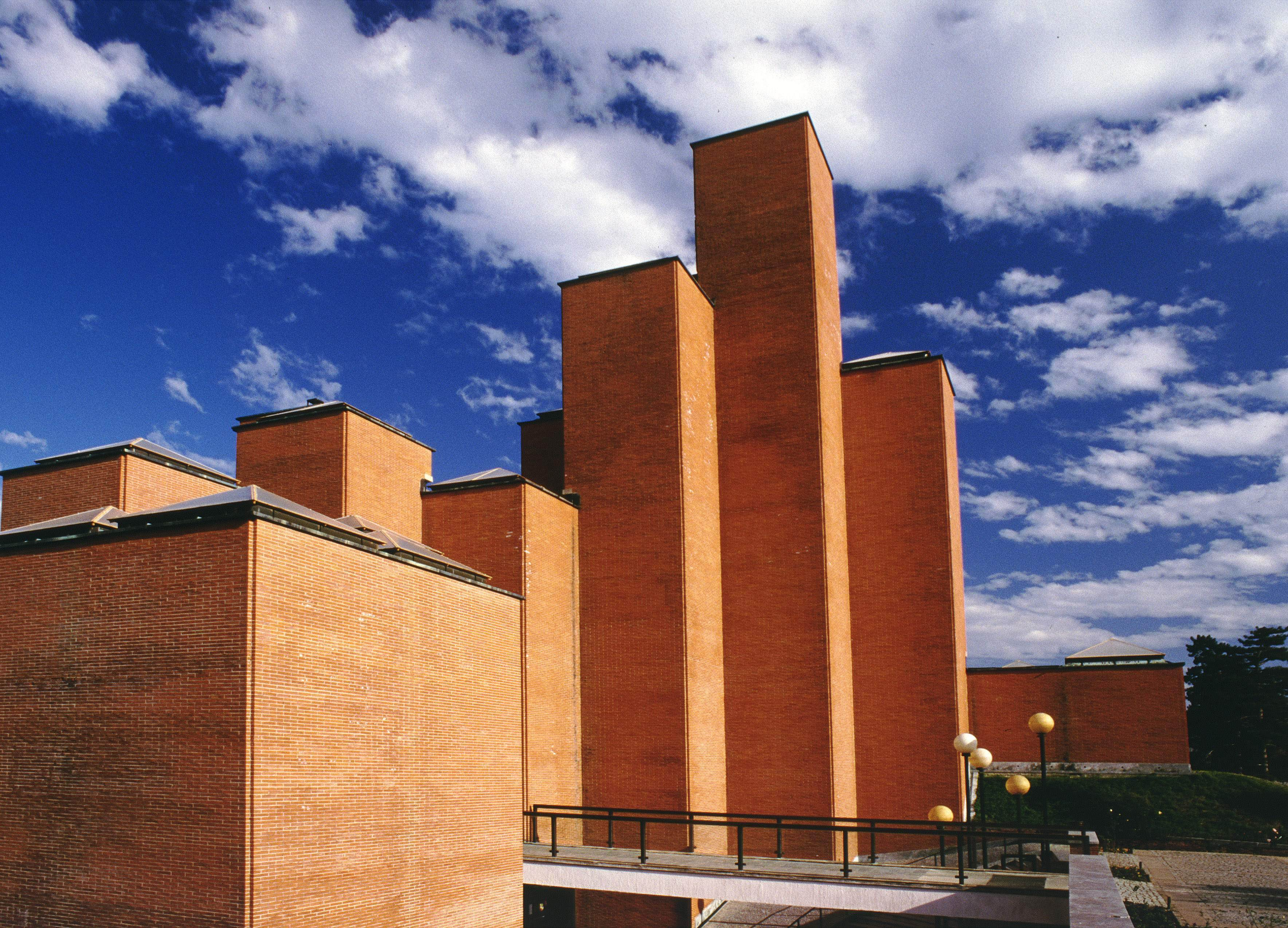
Museum of Genocide in Kragujevac.

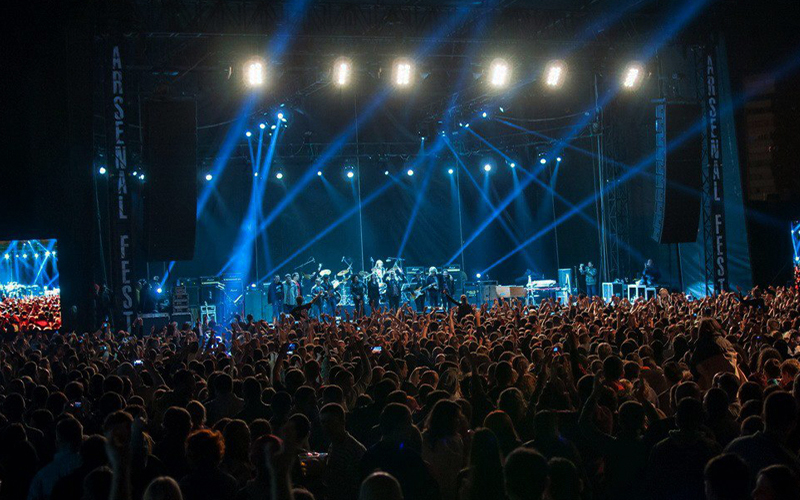
Arsenal Fest, 2016

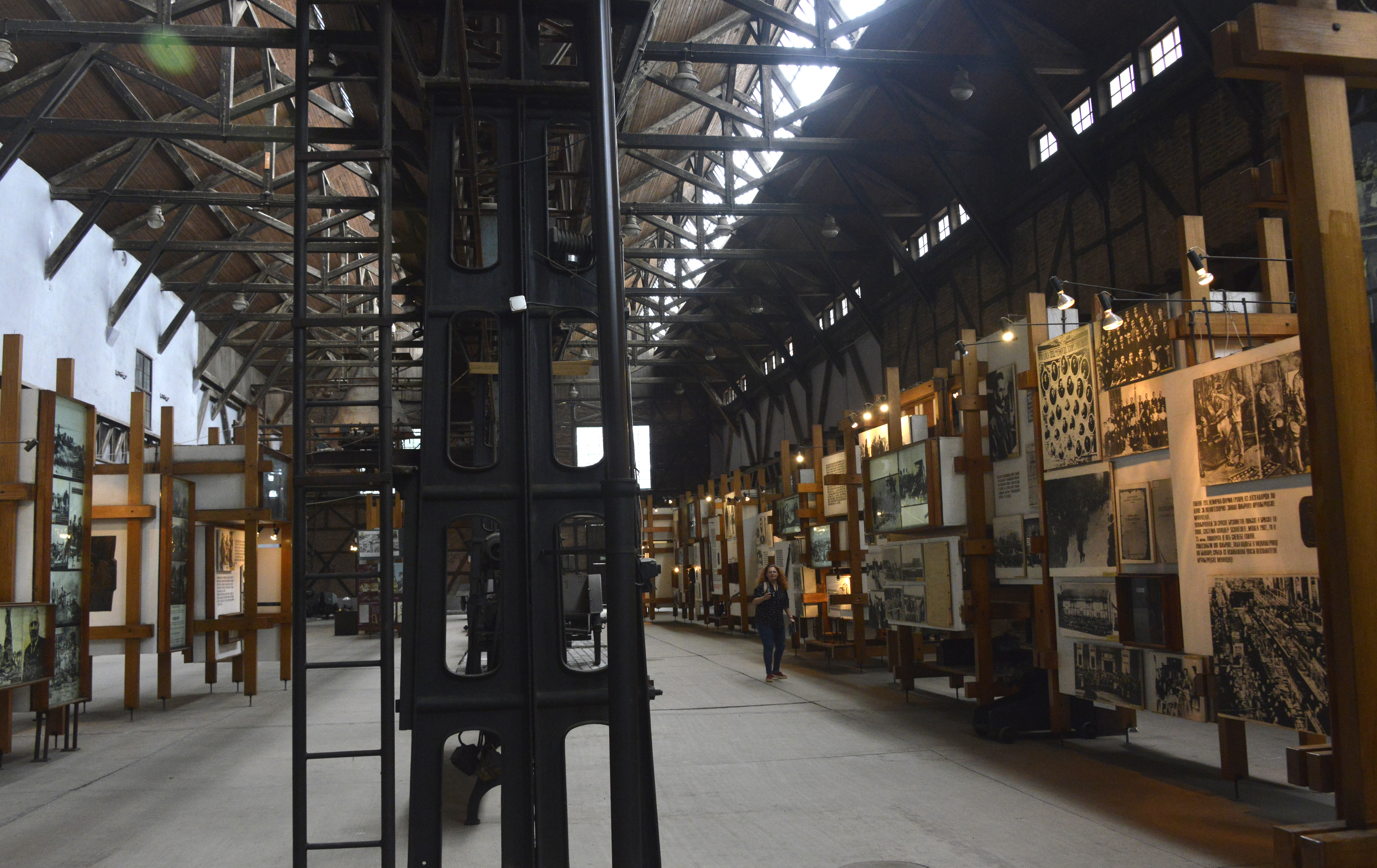
Stara Livnica Museum.

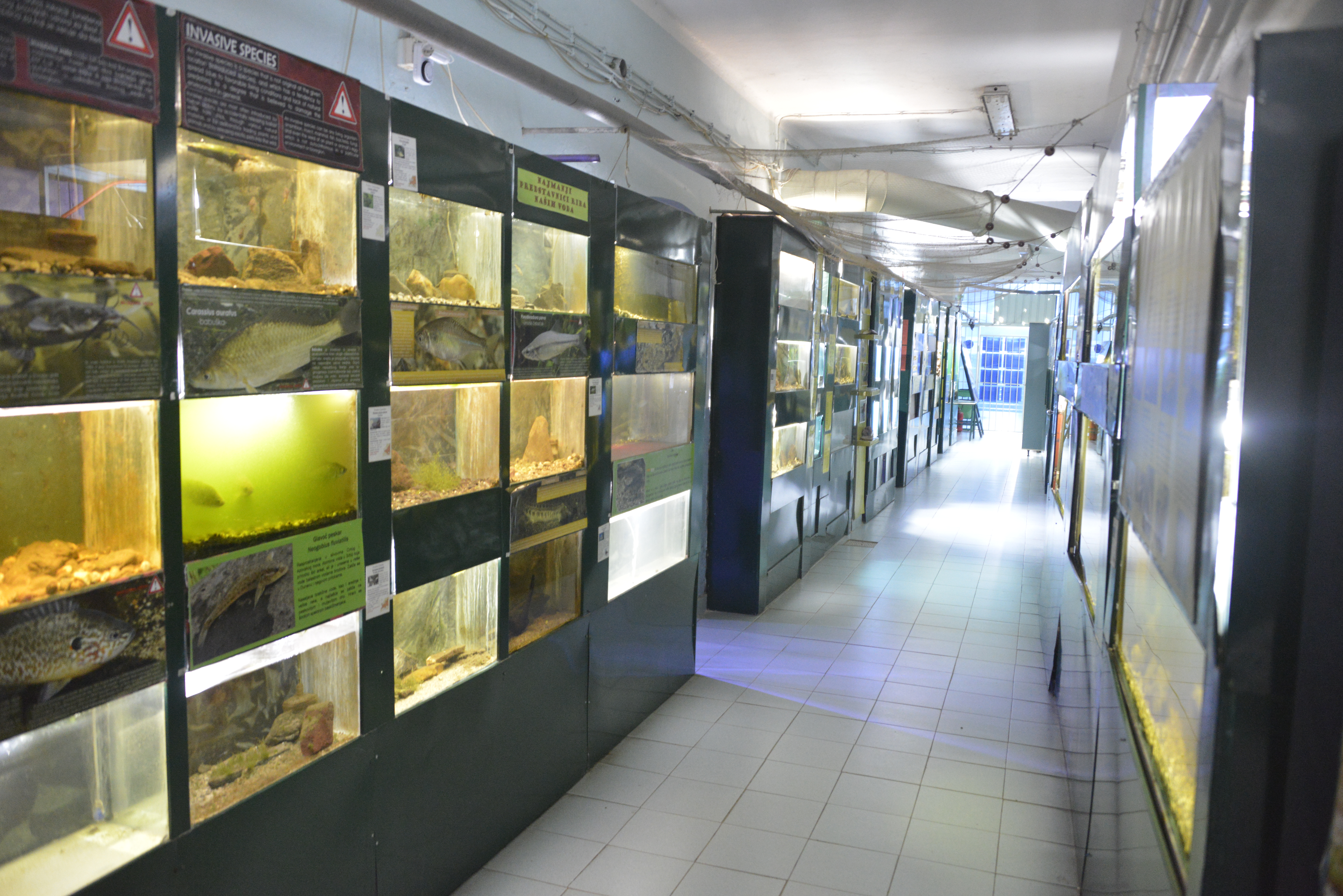
Kragujevac Aquarium.

There are many cultural institutions in Kragujevac that have gained regional and national significance in the arts. These institutions include:

- Knjaževsko-srpsko pozorište (founded in 1835)
- the National Library "Vuk Karadžić" (founded in 1866)
- the cultural and artistic group "Abrasević" (founded in 1904)
- The "October in Kragujevac Memorial Park", located in Šumarice, commemorating the tragic events of 21 October 1941
- The National Museum, with various displays including those pertaining to archaeology, ethnic diversity, the history of Kragujevac and Šumadija, and many paintings (the archaeology department has a rich collection of 10,000 display items and over 100,000 study items, while the painting department has over 1,000 pieces of prominent Serbian art of extraordinary value)
- The "Old Foundry Museum", located within the old gun foundry, presents the industrial development of Kragujevac and Serbia using a collection of 5,800 pieces: weapons and equipment, machines and tools, archive material, photos, paintings, trophies and medals.
- The Historical Archives of Šumadija, collecting and filing the archives and issues of the seven municipalities of Šumadija and has at its disposal 700 metres (2,297 feet) of archive issues with 780 registries and hundreds of thousands of original historical documents

There are three fine and applied arts associations in Kragujevac: the Art KG, the branch of the Serbian Association of Painters ULUS and the Association of Painters of Kragujevac, the ULUK. The most important annual and biannual cultural events include:

- the International Festival of Chamber Choir Music
- the International Festival of Chamber Music
- the International Small Forms Theatre Festival
- Arsenal Fest
- the International Saloon of Antiwar Cartoons
- the International Art Workshop "Balkan Bridges"
- the International Jazz Festival
- the International Puppet Theatre Festival

=== Sports ===
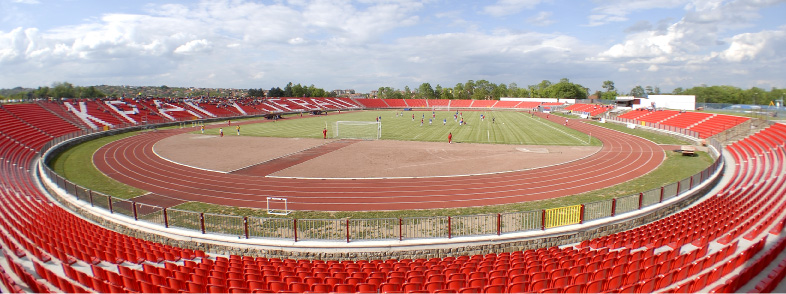
Čika Dača Stadium.

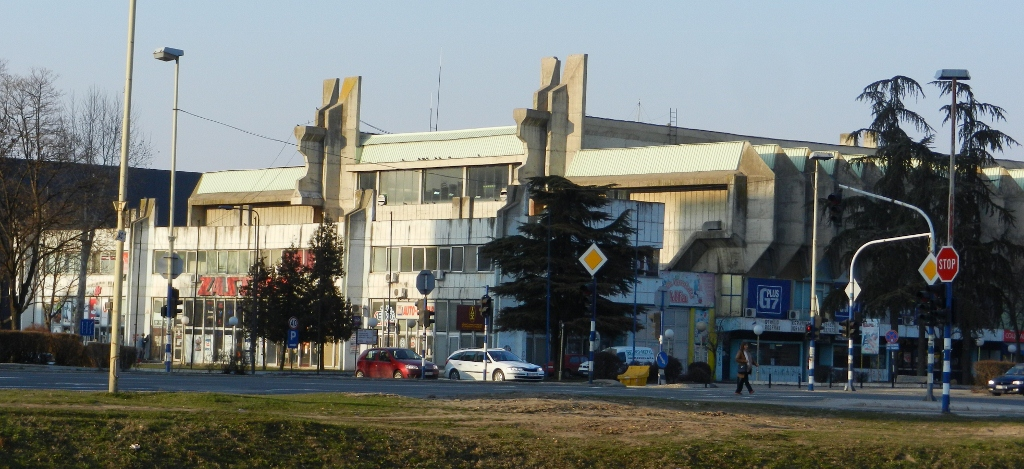
Jezero Hall.

Kragujevac is home to Čika Dača Stadium, the third largest stadium in Serbia by seat capacity. The largest and most important sports association in Kragujevac is Radnički, which brings together 19 clubs: football, athletics, volleyball, handball, boxing, wrestling etc. FK Radnički 1923 is the city's most successful football club and competes in the Serbian SuperLiga. Kragujevac is also known for having the oldest Serbian football club founded in the Kingdom of Serbia, FK Šumadija 1903. Other notable clubs are Arsenal 1930, Zastava 1973 and Slavija.

KK Radnički is the city's premier basketball team. Besides the Basketball League of Serbia it also competes in the local Adriatic Basketball League. Radnički volleyball club is one of strongest volleyball teams in Serbia, and water polo club VK Radnički Kragujevac competes in the Serbian Water polo League A and has won the domestic league and the LEN Trophy in 2013. The city is home to the CROSS OVER Basketball Summer Camp, and the Bandy Federation of Serbia. The team of Kragujevac plays against the one from Subotica.

The Faculty of Economics of the university in Kragujevac is the founder of the futsal club KMF Ekonomac. The club was founded by Professor Veroljub Dugalić, several teaching assistants and a group of Faculty of Economics students on 7 November 2000. The club is playing in Serbia's Prva Futsal Liga and has won the Serbian championship eight times and Serbian Futsal Cup twice.

=== Local media ===
Radio stations

- Radio Kragujevac (94.7)
- Radio 9 (95.9)
- TDI Radio (97.9)
- Radio Centar (98.7)
- Radio Bravo (103.7)
- Radio Stari Grad (RSG) (104.3)
- Radio Zlatousti (90.50)
- Radio 34 (88.9)

TV stations

- Televizija Kragujevac

Newspapers

- Kragujevačke novine

== Gallery ==
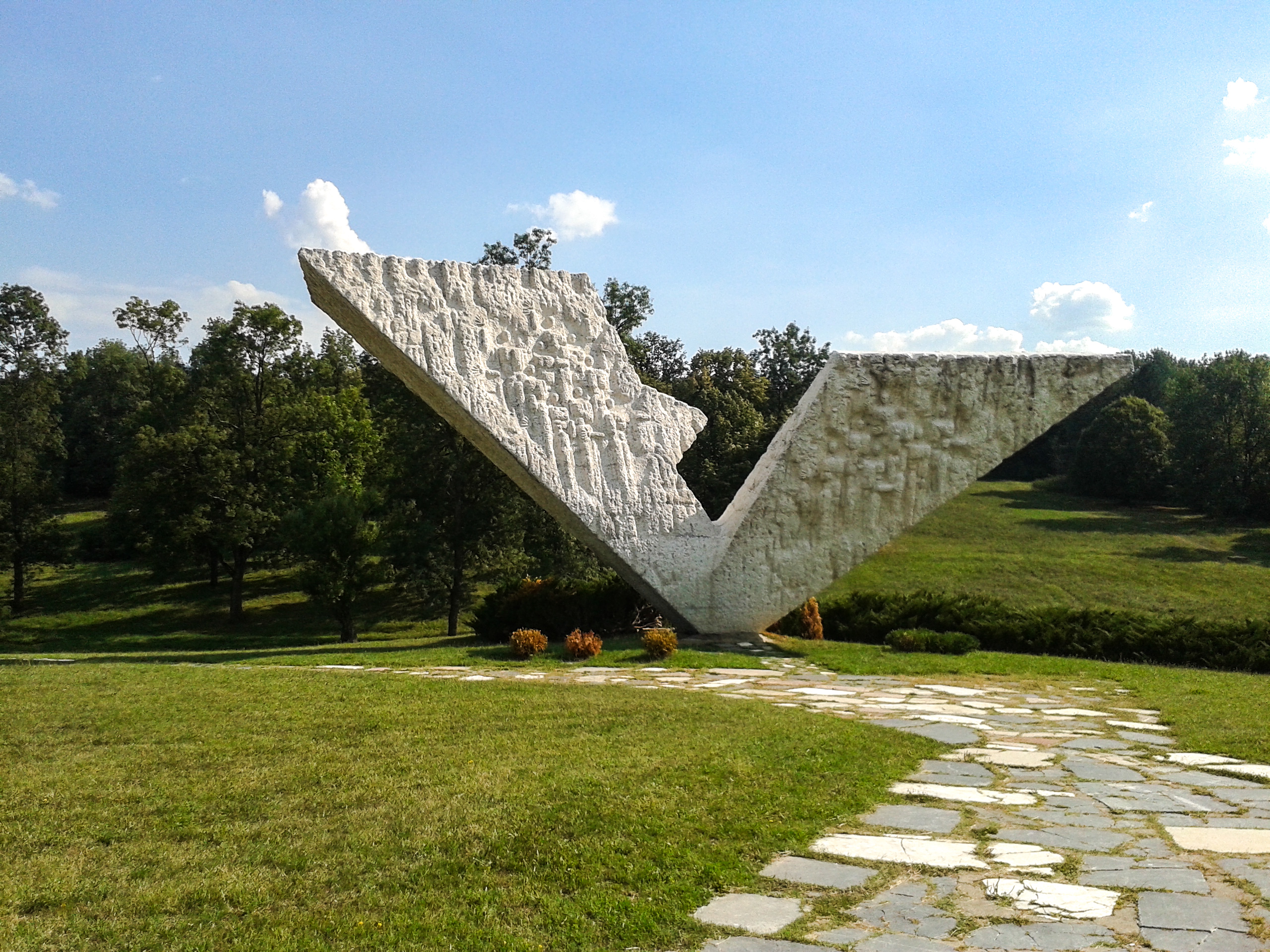
Monument to the executed pupils and teachers

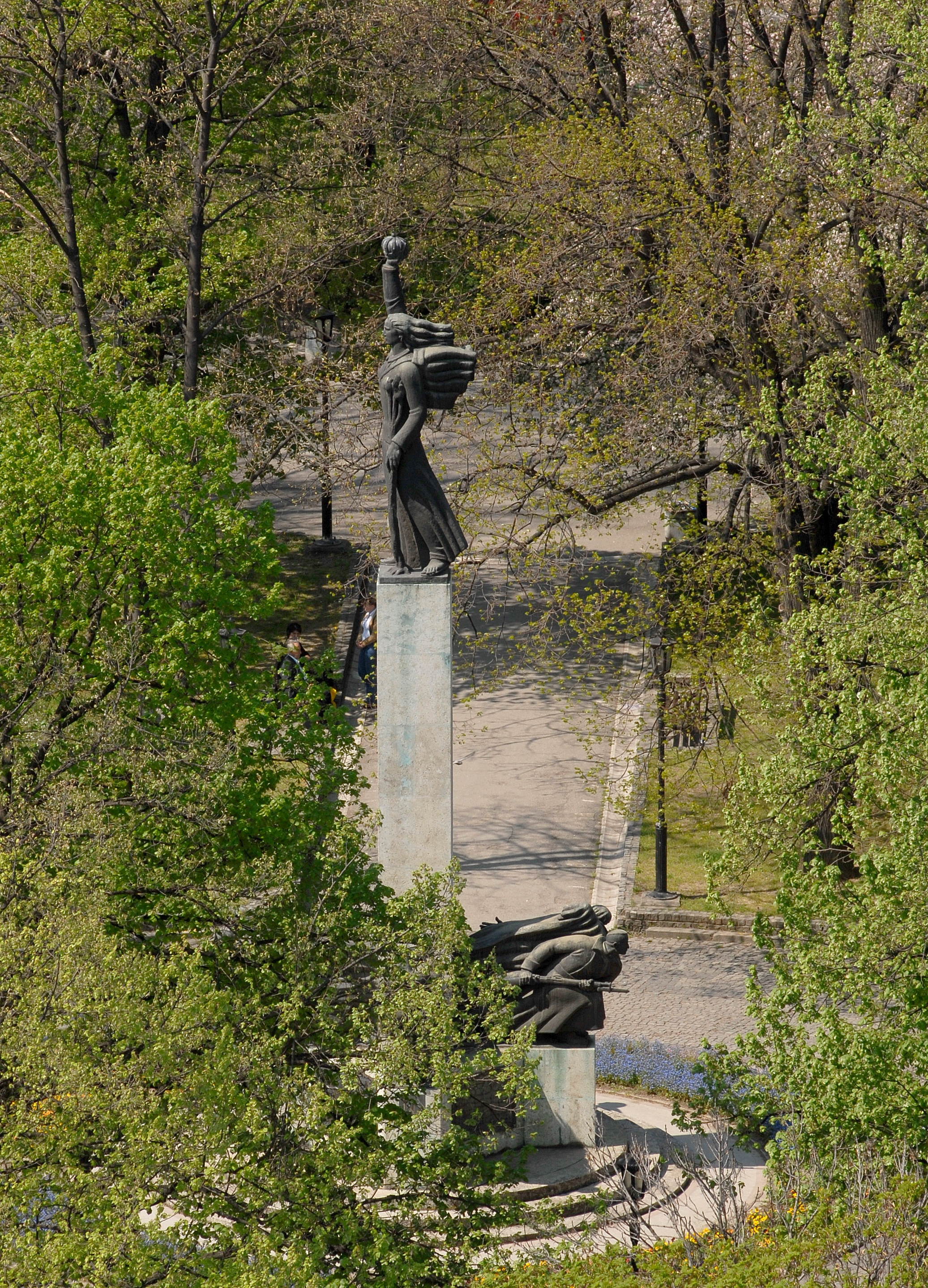
Description Monument to slain people from Šumadija in the wars

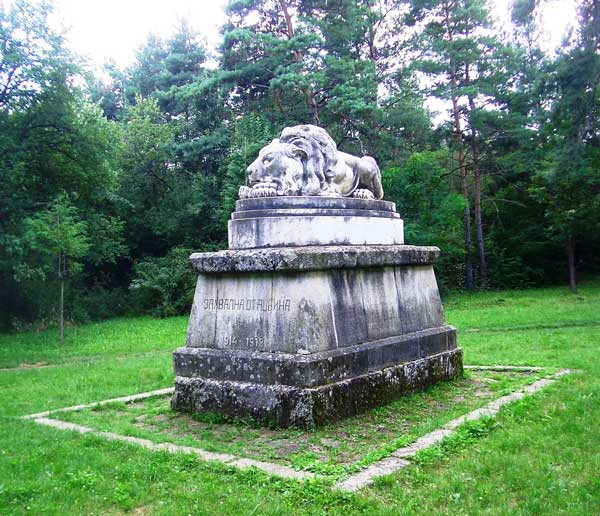
Stone lion in Šumarice park, World War I memorial

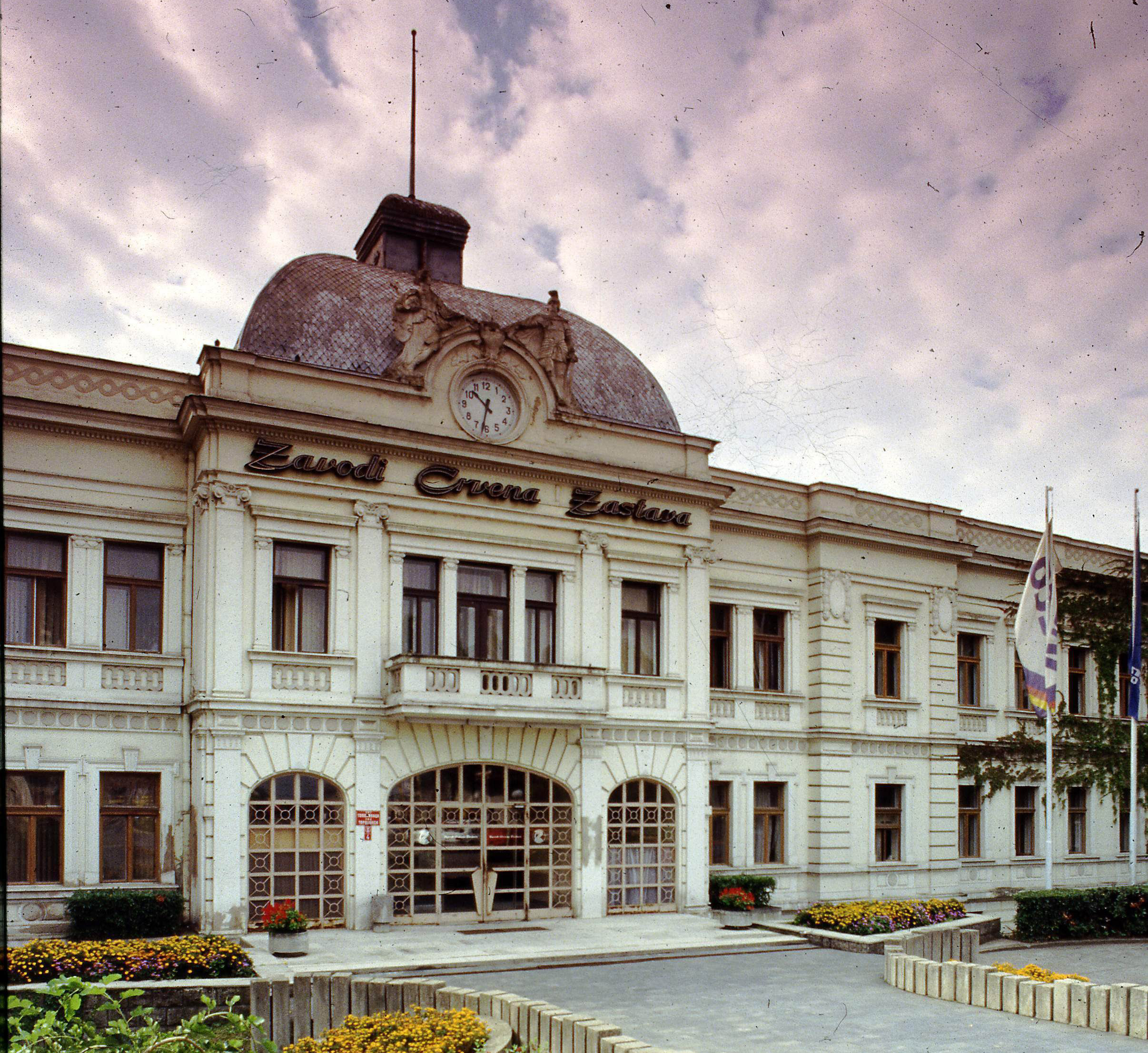
Zastava main gate

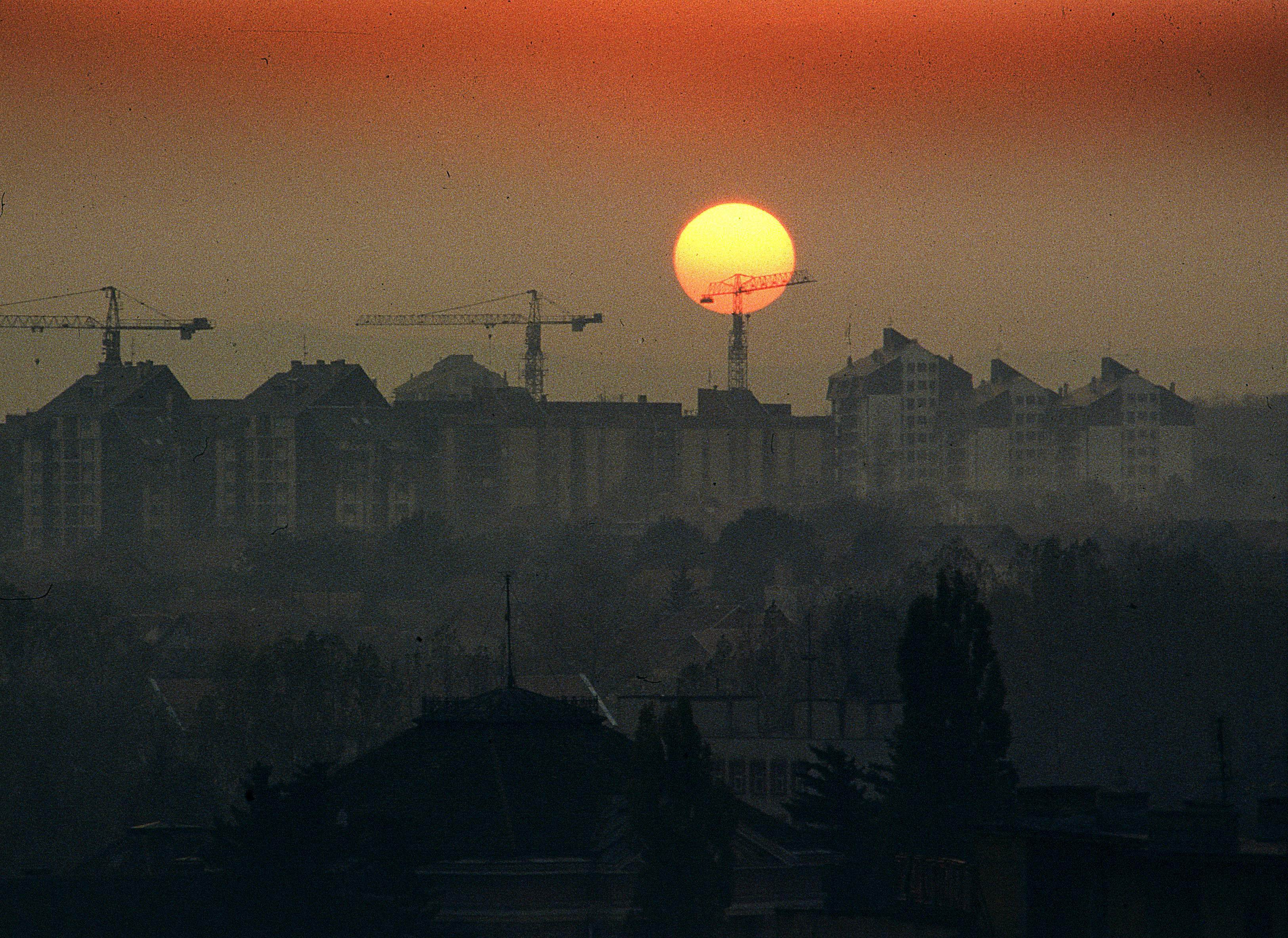
Densely populated city quarters

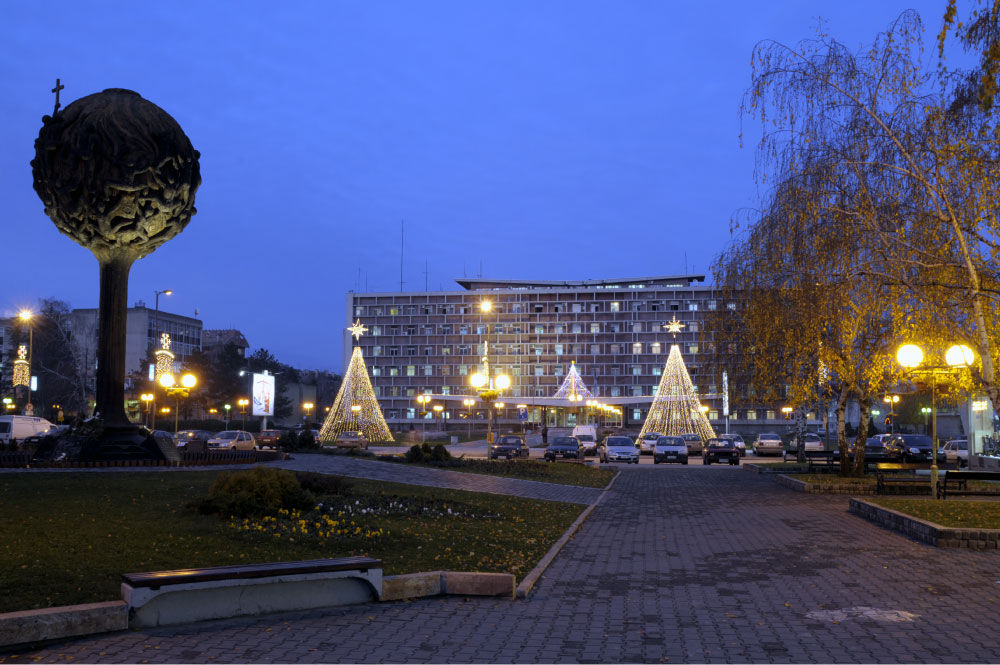
City center

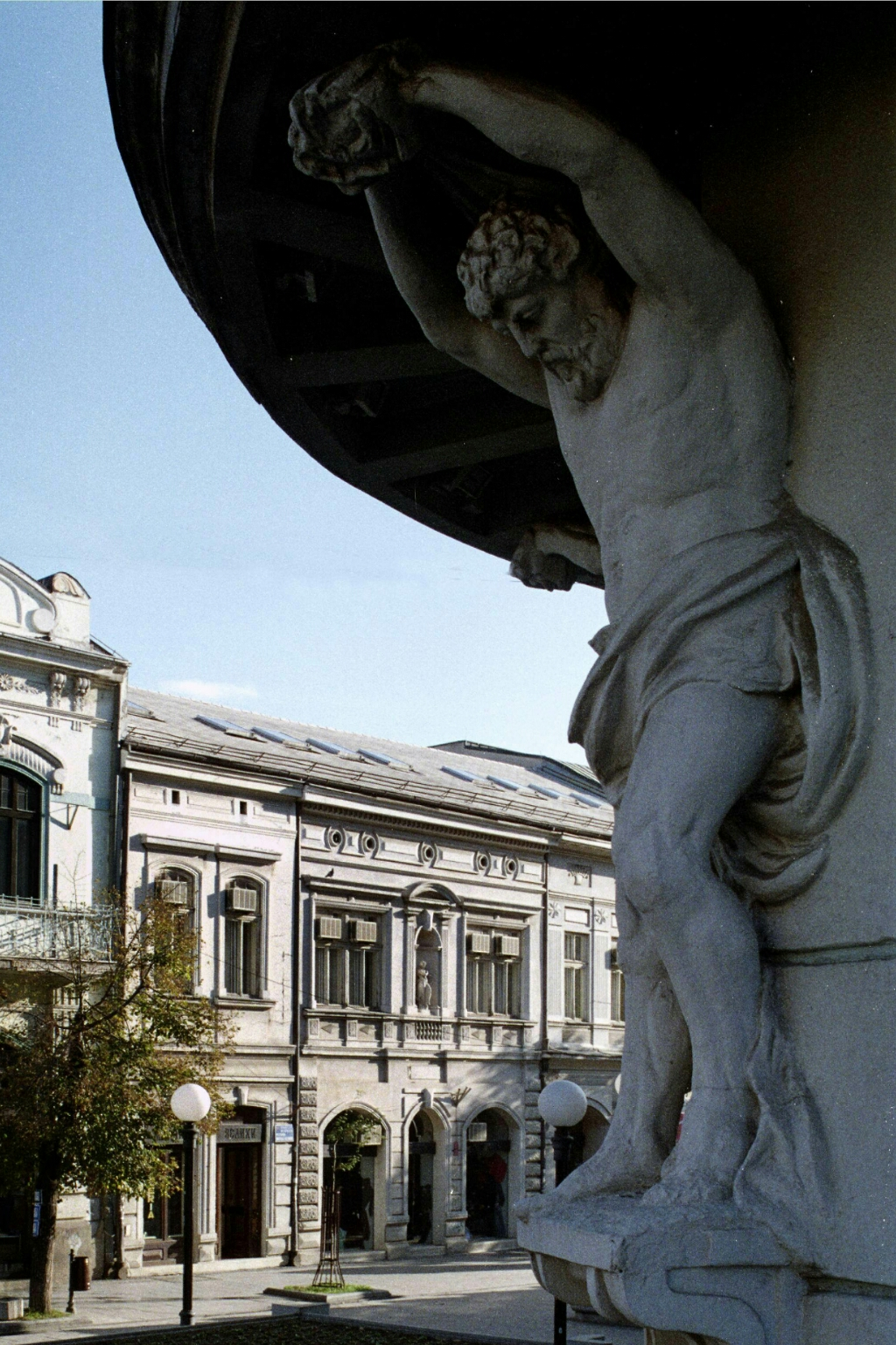
Main street

== Notable people ==
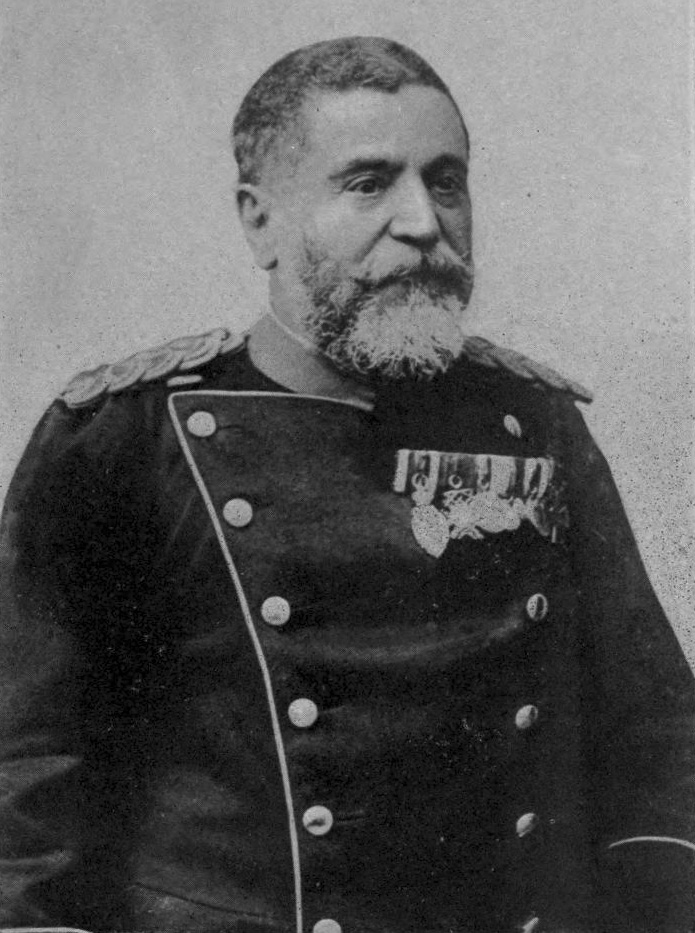
Radomir Putnik

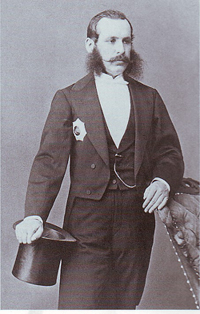
Jovan Ristić

- Milan Obrenović II, Prince of Serbia (1839)
- Mihailo Obrenović III, Prince of Serbia (1839–1842 and 1860–1868)
- Tomislav Nikolić, President of Serbia (2012–2017)
- Filip Kostić, Footballer
- Radomir Putnik, first Serbian Field Marshal (Voivoda), Chief of the General Staff (1890–1892, 1903–1905, 1908–1915), and Minister of Defense (1904–1905, 1906–1908, 1912)
- Jovan Ristić, President of the Ministry of Serbia (1867, 1873, 1878–1880, 1887–1888), Minister of Foreign Affairs (1867, 1872–1873, 1875, 1876–1880, 1887), and President of Serbian Academy of Science and Arts (1899)
- Dušan Simović, Chief of General Staff (1938–1940)
- Nikola Koka Janković, sculptor and full member of Serbian Academy of Science and Arts
- Radoje Domanović, writer and teacher
- Zoran Spasojević, writer
- Dragan Todorović, writer and multimedia artist
- Milan Dedinac, poet
- Draginja Adamović, poet
- Mille Marković, boxer, sex-club owner and convicted criminal and gangster
- Dragiša Nedović, songwriter, composer and musician
- Vidosav Stevanović, novelist, story writer, poet, playwright and publicist
- Dragoslav Srejović, archaeologist and historian
- Nataša Kandić, founder of the Humanitarian Law Center
- Mirko Babić, actor
- Dragomir Bojanić Gidra, actor
- Branislav Jerinić, actor
- Gorica Popović, actor
- Nikola Rakočević, actor
- Milovan "Minimaks" Ilić, radio and television host
- Bora Dugić, flautist
- Cune Gojković, singer
- Ljubica Marić, composer (1909–2003)
- Marija Šerifović, singer, Eurovision Song Contest winner of 2007
- Jelena Tomašević, singer
- Vesna Despotović, Serbian basketball player, Olympic bronze medalist (1980), and EuroBasket bronze medalist (1980)
- Stevan Pletikosić, Serbian sport shooter, six time Olympic participant, Olympic bronze medalist (1992), two time ISSF World Shooting Championships silver medalist (1994, 2006), and European Shooting Championship silver medalist (1995)
- Nikola Lončar, Serbian basketball player, Olympic silver medalist (1996), FIBA World Championship gold medalist (1998), FIBA European Championship gold (1997) and bronze medalist (1999), and Euroleague champion with KK Partizan (1992)
- Katarina Bulatović, Montenegrin handball player, Olympic silver medalist (2012) and European Women's Handball Championship gold medalist (2012)
- Marija Lojpur, handball player, 2013 World Championship silver medalist
- Jelena Milovanović, basketball player, Olympic bronze medalist (2016) and EuroBasket Women 2015 gold medalist (2015)
- Predrag Đorđević, footballer
- Danko Lazović, footballer
- Stefan Ilić, footballer, World U-20 champion
- Aleksa Ristić, basketball player Fiba 3x3 Debrecen masters
- Đorđe Kostić, basketball player Fiba 3x3 Debrecen masters
- Ivan Nedeljković, basketball player Fiba 3x3 Debrecen masters
- Filip Popović, basketball player Fiba 3x3 Debrecen masters
- Slavko Perović (footballer)
- Filip Holender, Hungarian footballer
- Svetozar Andrejević, merchant and philanthropist
- Milan Aleksić, footballer

== International relations ==
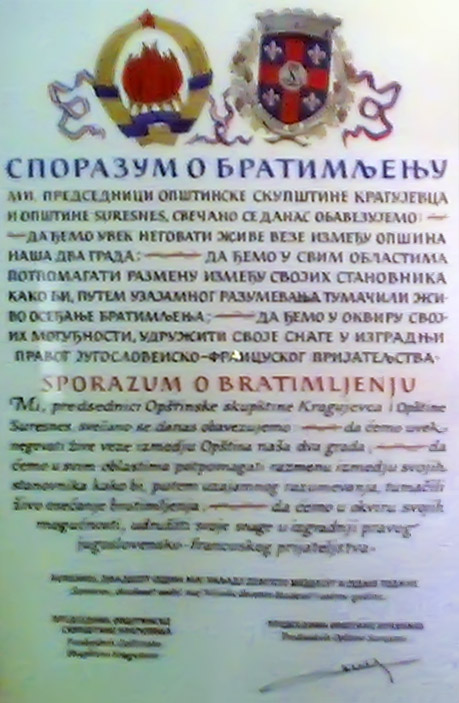
Kragujevac twinning agreement

=== Twin towns – Sister cities ===
Kragujevac is twinned with:

Suresnes, France, since 1967; Piteşti, Romania, since 1971; Bydgoszcz, Poland, since 1971; Ohrid, North Macedonia, since 2001	Bielsko-Biała, Poland, since 2002; Springfield, United States, since 2002; Ingolstadt, Germany, since 2003; Reggio Emilia, Italy, since 2004	Mogilev, Belarus, since 2006; Jericho, Palestine, since 2012; Milwaukee, United States, since 2024; Katerini, Greece, since 2025

=== Partnerships and cooperation ===
The town has other forms of cooperation and city friendship similar to the twin/sister city programmes with:

Trenčín, Slovakia; Sinchon, South Korea; Bat Yam, Israel, since 1992; Drama, Greece	Hanover, Germany; Mostar, Bosnia and Herzegovina; Karlovac, Croatia; Foča, Bosnia and Herzegovina	Opole, Poland; Carrara, Italy; Naples, Italy; Suncheon, South Korea

== See also ==
- List of places in Serbia
- University of Kragujevac
- First Kragujevac Gymnasium
- Šumarice Memorial Park
- Kragujevac massacre
- Knjaževsko-srpski teatar
- Joakimfest
- Arsenal Fest
- Šumadija fairground
- Gruža Lake

== Notes and references ==
=== Notes ===
- Spasić, Živomir. Prestonica Kragujevac: prilozi istoriji Kneževine Srbije: 1818–1841. Prizma, 1998.
