= History of the Serbian Air Force =

The history of the Serbian Air Force begins in 1912, when the air force was created and first aircraft were purchased. This made Serbia one of the first 15 states in the world to have an air force. Since that time, Serbian Air Force (in its various forms) has numbered thousands of pilots, more than five thousand aircraft, four types of missile mid-range systems, a number of small-range missile systems and some 15 radar types.

== Kingdom of Serbia ==
The idea to form air forces in the Royal Serbian Army was first mentioned in the General Army Formation Act from 2 August 1893. This act envisioned that within each division of the Army be formed one air force balloon company.

The first aviation pioneer in Serbia was Major Kosta Miletić who was trained as a balloon pilot at the Technical Aeronautical School in Saint Petersburg, Russia from 1901 to 1902, Miletić was also trained in the use of carrier pigeons. On the recommendation of Miletić, the Royal Serbian Army posed messenger pigeon stations (in 1908 in Medoševac near Niš and in 1909 in Pirot), and bought two free spherical and one tied kite balloon from the August Ridinger company from German city of Augsburg. At the reception ceremony, on 19 April 1909, Kosta Miletić flew a spherical balloon called "Srbija". One balloon was provided from Russia. A gas chamber was ordered from the Dillmann company in Berlin, and a field winch from Saint Petersburg. A hydrogen unit was provided from the Swiss company Oerlikon. The equipment was delivered to Serbia in 1909 and 1910.

The first competition for cadet airmen was opened in May 1911, and in the following year the first class of Serbian pilots started their flying training in France from 21 May – 8 September 1912. They finished the course in the beginning of the First Balkan War with aircraft and the balloons that had already been obtained prior to the outbreak of war. In 1912, a group of Serbian officers were sent abroad to a Pilot Training Program in France. At the same time aircraft were purchased and by the Act of the Minister of Army Radomir Putnik, on 24 September 1912 an Air Force Command was established in Niš. Serbian Aviation (Srpska Avijatika) was the fifth ever air force founded in the world in 1912. Serbian Air Force was created when the aviation as vital part of the ground units was the question of the prestige under the military commands of the world. Considering what was Serbian position at that time, a very small and poor, it was really hard to form the air force knowing. The real reason why Serbia hurried to form its own air force was the growing tension between the Kingdom of Serbia and Austria-Hungary. Also, it was the question of preparing the Balkan countries for the final driving out of Turkish forces from Europe. Serbia was not only aware of all these problems but was also forced to equip Serbian military with the aircraft and the balloons (of course with a great material renunciation). Serbia had purchased the first two balloons in 1909 from Augsburg; the same place where almost 30 years later the Royal Yugoslav Air Force had purchased the Messerschmitt Bf 109 E-3 in 1937. The time of purchasing these balloons was the time of the growing crisis about the annexation of Bosnia and Herzegovina under Austria-Hungary, which could have easily caused the war with this great military force.

=== Balkan Wars ===
The First Balkan War broke out in October 1912, with Serbia, Montenegro, Greece, and Bulgaria waging it against the Ottoman Empire in a final attempt to liberate the last of the territories that the Turks still occupied in Europe. The Royal Serbian Army advanced south through Kosovo into Macedonia, then turned west toward the Adriatic coast, through central Albania. At the same time, the Montenegrin army advanced into Albania from the north and laid siege to the historic fortified city of Shkodra.

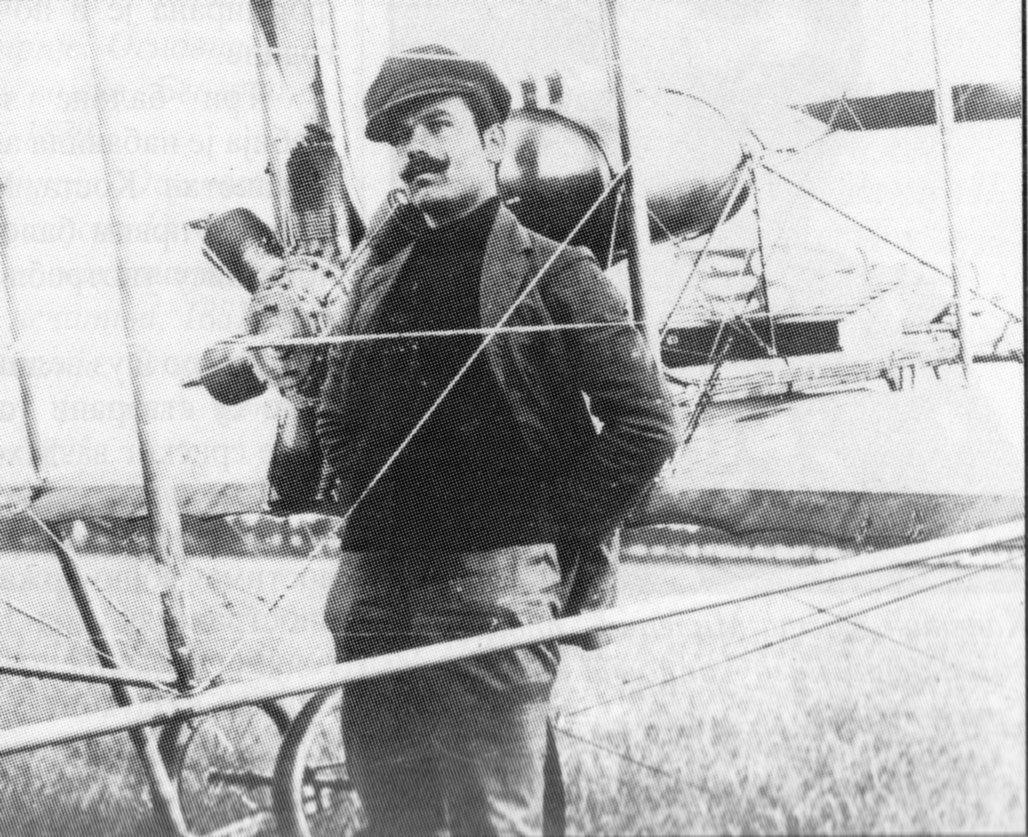
Mihajlo Petrović, the first trained Serbian pilot

In February 1913, the Royal Serbian Army High Command formed a separate Coastal (Primorski) Army Corps in order to assist the Montenegrin army on the Shkodra front. Air support for this formation was assigned to the newly established "Coastal Airplane Squad", the first Serbian air combat unit, with 3 airplanes and 4 pilots under the command of major Kosta Miletić. In March 1913, this combat air unit was relocated near the frontline at a newly built auxiliary airfield in the village of Barbalusi. The first reconnaissance flight was made on 20 March (7 March, oldstyle), by Lt. Zivojin Stanković and Sgt. Mihailo Petrović. In this combat-reconnaissance flight on his Farman HF. 20 over the Skadar Front on 20 March 1913, Sgt. Mihailo Petrović was killed, thus becoming the first casualty in the history of the Serbian military aviation and the second one in world aviation history. Mihajlo Petrović was the first trained Serbian airplane pilot. He completed his training and exams at the famous Farman pilot school in France and was awarded the international FAI license no. 979 in June 1912. His Serbian pilot's license carries the number 1. The next day, pilots Lt. Zivojin Stankovich and Sgt. Miodrag Tomich successfully completed their first reconnaissance flights, and in the following days, pilots Milos Ilic, Stankovich and Tomich dropped a number of small bombs and conducted reconnaissance flights. A fascinating fact represents that the pilot Tomich and Esad Pasha, the former Turkish commander at the Skadar frontline, would meet in a completely different situation two years later, during the First World War, when pilot Tomich needed help.

The commander was Major Kosta Miletić, and it comprised an Aircraft Squadron which counted 12 military aircraft, the Balloon Company, the Pigeon post and the Airbase. A year later, during the siege of the town of Shkodra, Serbian Air Force had their baptism of fire. The first planes used in the Serbian Air Force were the Blériot XI and Farman HF.20. On 24 December 1912 the head of the Ministry of the Army Radomir Putnik approved the formation of the Air Force Command located in Niš; this date is regarded in Serbia as marking the official founding of the air force. Serbian Aviation (Srpska avijatika) comprised the Aircraft Detachment (which counted 12 aircraft), the Balloon Company, the pigeon post and the airbase. The Serbian Air Force combat missions over Shkodra in March 1913 brought the first combat flight fatality, sergeant-pilot Mihajlo Petrović was killed, the second pilot to be killed in air combat in history. The first recorded fatality was a Bulgarian pilot, Topradzijev, who was killed in 1912 when he was flying back from a reconnaissance mission over Edirne, during the Battle of Adrianople (1913). Mihajlo Petrović was the first trained Serbian airplane pilot. He completed his training and exams at the famous Farman pilot school in France and was awarded the international FAI license no.979 in June 1912. His Serbian pilot's license carries the number 1. This made Serbia, one of the first 15 states in the world to have an air force.

After Bulgaria attacked at Bregalnica in Serbia, the Second Balkan War began. The first reconnaissance mission had been performed by Miodrag Tomić, and after that Tomić and Stanković took turns and during a period of a month and a half, as the war with Bulgarians lasted, the two airmen performed 21 reconnaissance missions, of which Tomić did 14 flights. During one flight above Kriva Palanka, Tomić encountered a Bulgarian plane in the air, but neither one had weapons and they just greeted one another by hand waving.

The first six military pilots were trained in France. They finished the course in the beginning of the First Balkan War. On 24 December 1912, the head of the military Minister Radomir Putnik signed the papers about forming the Air Force Command situated in Niš which included: the Aircraft Squad (which counted 11 military aircraft), the Balloon Squad, the Pigeon post and the Base. This date is the date of formation of the Serbian Air Force. Its first combat experience, Serbian Air Force had experienced in March 1913 over Shkodra which was in the Central Force hands. On the first combat flight, sergeant-pilot Mihajlo Petrović was killed as the second victim of World Military Aviation. The first victim of military aviation was a Bulgarian pilot Topradzijev who was killed in 1912 when he was flying back from the reconnaissance mission over Edirne, Turkey.

=== World War I ===
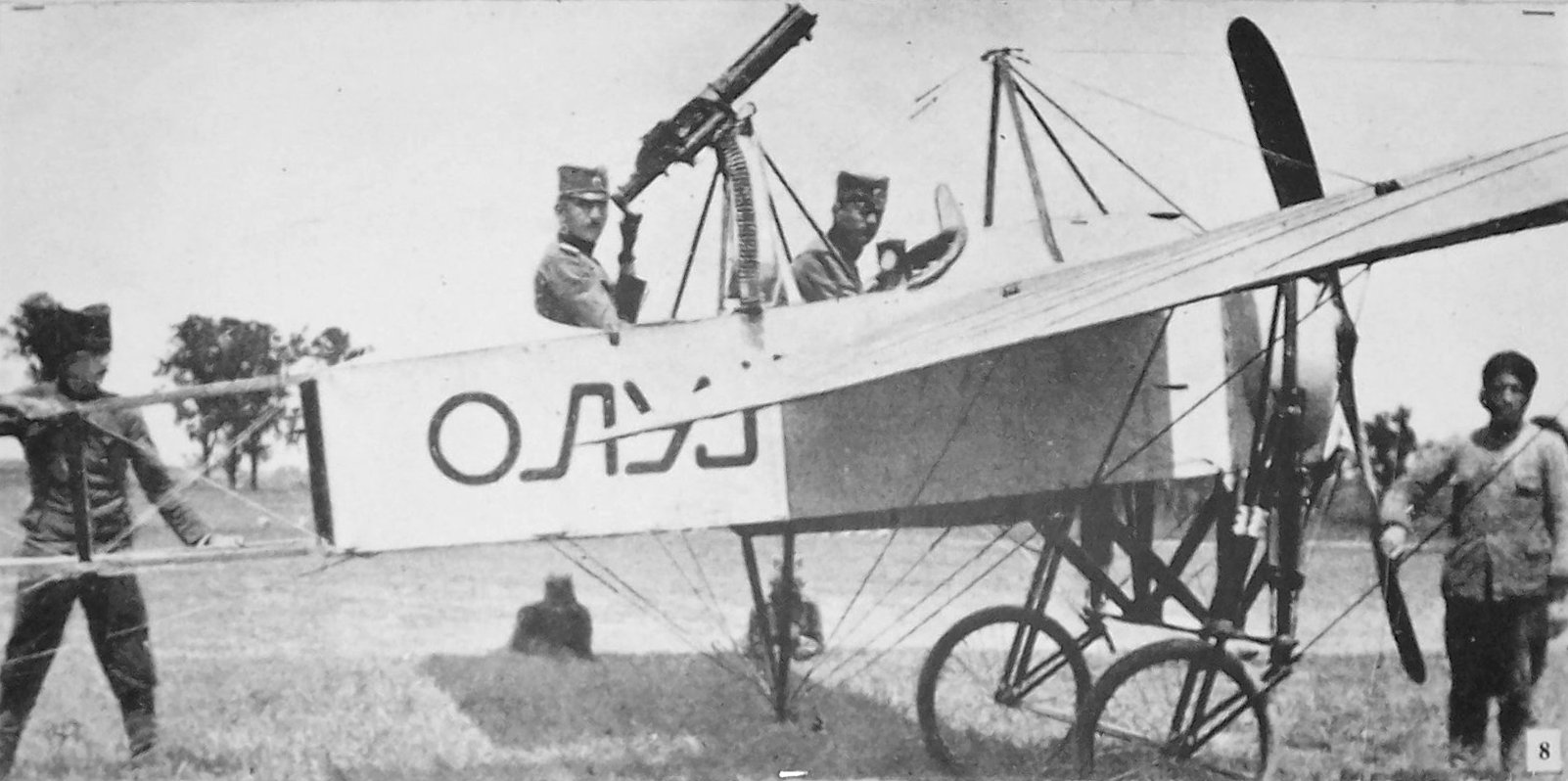
Lt. Miodrag Tomić and observer Milutin Mihailović seated in their Blériot XI-2 Génie airplane, at the Serbian Front, May 1915.

General mobilisation in the summer of 1914 found Serbian Aeroplane Wing not well prepared. Aeroplane Wing had only 9 aeroplanes of which 7 in flying condition. Five planes and three pilots were relocated to Dabića airfield. From that airfield, Captain Živojin Stanković and 2nd Lieutenant Miodrag Tomić on August 13, 1914 commenced their first reconnaissance flights in World War I. Serbian pilots who were actually skilled and experienced from the Balkan Wars had succeeded to give the valuable information about the number, the movements, and the position of the enemy troops. They contributed to early Serbian victories in 1914 at Cer Mountain, Kolubara and Drina river. At the beginning of 1915, armed with machine guns and bombs, Serbian pilots succeeded to fight back the enemy by attacking their aircraft flying over the Serbian sovereign territory or by bombing the important targets in the background positions. Because of air supremacy of the Austro-Hungarian Aviation Troops over Serbian Front, in March 1915 the French squadron (Escadrille MFS.99) arrived to aid weakness Serbian Aeroplane Wing. French squadron held the frontline from Smederevo to Loznica, and Serbian Wing from Smederevo to Golubac. After the conquest of Serbia by the Central Powers in the autumn of 1915 and the great retreat of Serbian army to island of Corfu, in the spring 1916 was formed Macedonian front. In the autumn of 1915, Serbia conducted the first medical transport of the wounded and sick in the world aviation history. One of the ill soldiers in that first medical transport was Milan Rastislav Štefánik, a Slovak pilot-volunteer who was flown to safety by French aviator Louis Paulhan.

Anti-aircraft field gun "Schneider M-907" near Belgrade, 21 July – 3 August 1915

Serbia formed on 8 June 1915 one of the first air defense and air warning units in the world. This was due to the massive onslaught of German and Austro-Hungarian aircraft. The first airplane shot down by ground fire unit in World War I happened over skies of Serbia. During the German air attack on city of Kragujevac on 30 September 1915, air defense artillerist Radivoje-Raka Lutovac from "Tanasko Rajić" Regiment, shot his first hit, by his artillery modified gun, a Farman airplane with two crew members. Without any sophisticated cannon sights, he was aiming through the bore of his gun.

During the time of 1914–1915, the first Serbian-made planes were produced. They had been made mostly by craftsmen in various furniture factories. These early Serbian planes were used for training, since they were underpowered. While construction was Serbian, airplane motors were French-made. This aircraft design had the name "Pingvin" or "Penguin class". Only few of these were ever made. Although modest, this domestic design was inspiration for creating Serbian aviation industry after the World War I.

In the course of the Austro-Hungarian offensive and the retreating of the Serbian army, the French and Serbian pilots succeeded to stop the movements and intentions of the enemy. This information was very valuable to Serbian Supreme Command, who were retreating under the constant and strong pressure of the enemy who also was helped by the Bulgarian Army. The plan for retreating was that the soldiers together with the civilians would go through Albania and Montenegro, all the way to the Adriatic Sea. In the course of the retreat, the French and Serbian pilots did the first operation of carrying the injured soldiers with aircraft. The French-Serbian pilots had also organized the maintenance of the connection with the units retreating through Albanian coast to Durrës and Vlorë.

Maurice Farman MF.11 biplane at Thessaloniki front line in 1916

Serbian Air mechanics on Farman MF.11, Corfu, March 1916

1st Serbian Aviation Squadron, 1918

Although Serbia was occupied in late 1915, by German, Austro-Hungarian and Bulgarian armies, the Serbian government and armed forces refused surrender. The entire Serbian army withdrew through Albania, into Greece, where they together with French and British forces created the Thessaloniki front.

French pilots had left the Shkodra area in December 1915. When the last aircraft was destroyed, Serbian pilots together with the Serbian Army had crossed to Corfu Island. In the period of World War I, Serbian pilots had succeeded to show the importance of the military aviation to all ministers and to secure the place of aviation in its modernized version. The French squadron has improved the opinion about the Air Force because it has represented the secure collaborator in all phases of battle. In the second part of World War I on the Thessaloniki front line, the Air Force had played a big part for it was equipped and armored with modern weapons and modern aircraft. As the war industry grew really fast, the Serbian Air Force obtained modern aircraft. After the re-organization in Corfu, the Serbian Air Force squadron had been moved to Mikra; not far away from the Thessaloniki. The material conditions of the Royal Serbian Army caused that all available, trained, and capable aviation staff be referenced to five French squadrons. These squadrons were added to Serbia on the Allied Forces Conference in Paris. The Serbian Supreme Command wanted to have certain level of independence over its own Air Force and it secured the independence under Command of the Serbian squadron in Mikra. There was also a strong will for the formation of an independent Serbian Aviation Squadron. These five Serbian-French squadrons formed the "Serbian Aviation" which was working as an integral part of the Royal Serbian Army. Allied forces squadrons (such as British, Italian and Greek) who actually had their own aviation units, also helped the formation. In the certain phases of World War I, the Central Force Air Forces succeeded to establish the dominance in the air, but at the end of World War I (especially at the time of breaking out the Thessaloniki's front line), allied forces command had realized the value of this course, and the Serbian-French units, together with the allied forces Air Forces, had succeeded defeating enemy. The summer of 1918 was period of the absolute control of the sky over this area by the allied forces. Successive and strong break up which Serbian divisions did as well as their break up in the Vardar Valley, caused the Bulgarian capitulation when the Royal Serbian Army after only 45 days had succeeded to move the enemy lines for 600 kilometers, to be the winner for the third time in this, Austria-Hungary was defeated. On the Thessaloniki's front Serbian Air Force did 3,000 combat flights, participated at all main operations and receipted the end of World War I in the associated unit which counted 60 modern aircraft. The staff of this unit consisted of 70 pilots, 40 reconnaissance pilots, and other aviation specialists. This aviation had staff and equipment with enormous experience.

By the order dated 17 January 1918, the two Serbian squadrons were to be formed and staffed with Serbian personnel. In April 1918 1st Serbian Aviation Squadron became operational with 12 Dorand AR type I A2 and 3 Nieuport 24 C1 from French-Serbian composite Squadron AR 521 and commanded by French officer (Serb national) lieutenant Mihajlo Marinković. During May and June, the French-Serbian composed 2nd Serbian Squadron became operational. Captain Branko Vukosavljević was the first Serbian squadron commander who was appointed to lead to 1st Serbian Squadron in August 1918.

== Kingdom of Yugoslavia ==
The period between two world wars was marked by a significant growth of Air Force, accompanied by the production of modern and sophisticated aircraft, with then ongoing organizational-formation changes within the Air Force. With the establishment of the Kingdom of Yugoslavia, an Army Aviation Department was formed out of Serbian and ex-Austro-Hungarian (Croatian and Slovenian) personnel. In 1923, a major initiative was launched to replace World War I era aircraft still in service with more modern designs. Contracts were placed abroad and with newly established local factories. The Aviation Department was renamed the Aviation Command and placed directly under the control of the Ministry of Military and Navy. In 1930, the Aviation Command was renamed the Royal Yugoslav Air Force (Jugoslovensko Kraljevsko Ratno Vazduhoplovstvo).

As of 1924, 2 August, the Saint Elijah feast-day was observed as the patron saint day of Yugoslav Air Forces, with the Saint Elijah the Lightning Bearer as a patron saint of military and other pilots of then existing Yugoslavian Kingdom.

=== World War II ===
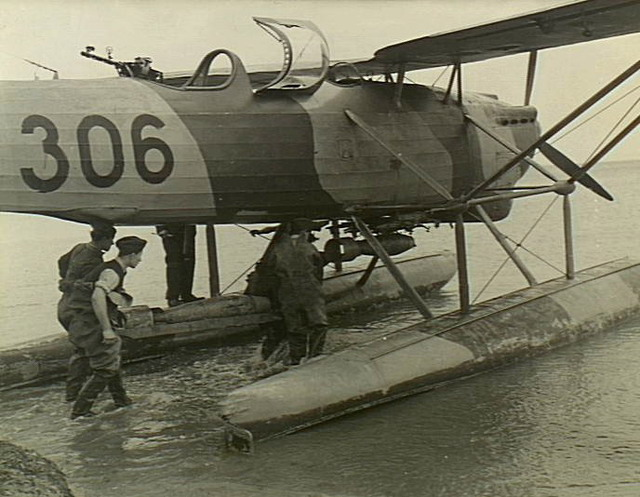
Armament personnel bombing-up one of the seaplanes of a Royal Yugoslav Air Force unit operating in the Western Desert (North Africa), 1942

The attacking forces engaged in the April War (6 to 17 April 1941) were 2,373 aircraft strong, including 1,212 aircraft from Germany, 647 from Italy and 287 from Hungary, while the Royal Yugoslav Air Force had 494 airplanes, only 269 of a modern type. Thus the ratio in the beginning of operations was 5:1 in favor of the Axis powers, and if counting only modern Yugoslav aircraft the ratio climbs to 7:1 in favor of the Axis powers. In spite of huge logistic difficulties and acts of treason (proclamation of the puppet-state Independent State of Croatia on 10 April 1941) the Royal Yugoslav Air Force fulfilled its duties with honor. Yugoslav airmen (5th and 6th Fighter Regiment pilots especially) fought courageously against an enemy superior both technically and numerically. During the war operations a total of 1,416 take-offs was made, 993 of which were performed by fighters and 423 by bombers. During this short war 135 flight crew members and 576 ground personnel lost their lives. About 300 Royal Yugoslav Air Force personnel evacuated, first to Greece then to Crete. After the Battle of Crete they went on to the deserts of the Near and Middle East, where for a short time they found a safe place. In June 1941 the 20th Hydroaviation Squadron under command of Lieutenant Vladeta Petrović with their no surrender war flag was renamed in the 2nd Yugoslav Squadron, attached to No. 230 Squadron RAF. Up until 23 April 1942 the squadron flew 912 combat mission (1,760 flying hours) and lost four aircraft. The main mission of the squadron was anti-submarine patrol and protected allied shipping.

== Socialist Yugoslavia ==
After World War II the Air Force underwent several developmental stages, the first major air force modernization being performed from 1953 to 1959. Aircraft made in the West are introduced thus broaching the era of jet aviation. With the forming of first helicopter squadron in 1954 the chopper units were also incorporated within the reorganised Air Forces branch, renamed to Yugoslav Air Force (Jugoslovensko Ratno Vazduhoplovstvo). At the beginning of 1960s supersonic fighters were introduced, followed by intensive growth of Yugoslav aviation industry in that period. A number of jet planes prototypes were constructed, which served as basis for the development of training fighters and fighter aircraft, such as Soko G-2 and J-21 Jastreb, G-4 Super Galeb and Soko J-22 Orao and the most advanced fighter aircraft MiG-29 was introduced in the mid-1980s.

=== Yugoslav Wars ===
In June 1991 the Slovenes resistance to re-imposition of federal control over Slovenia rapidly escalated into an armed conflict with Yugoslav Armed Forces. During the Ten-Day War in Slovenia two Yugoslav Air Force helicopters were shot down, while it launched air strikes on TV transmitters and Slovenian territorial defence positions. During the War in Croatia, the Yugoslav Air Force was active providing transport and close air support missions to Yugoslav Ground Forces, but was gradually forced to abandon air bases outside of ethnic Serbian held areas. The Yugoslav Air Force equipment in Bosnia and Herzegovina was given to the new Republika Srpska Air Force and used during the War in Bosnia. In 1991 and 1992, the Yugoslav Air Force lost a total of 46 airplanes and helicopters in Slovenia, Croatia and Bosnia-Herzegovina. The bulk of the Yugoslav Air Force was inherited by the newly-formed Air Force of Serbia and Montenegro in 1992.

== Serbia and Montenegro ==
An important portion of the 1999 war between Yugoslavia and the NATO coalition involved combat between the Air Force of Serbia and Montenegro (Ratno Vazduhoplovstvo Srbije i Crne Gore), which was the predecessor of today's Serbian Air Force, and the opposing air forces of NATO. United States Air Force F-15s and F-16s flying mainly from Italian air bases attacked the defending Serbo-Montenegrin fighters—usually MiG-29s, which were in bad shape, due to lack of spare parts and maintenance. A total of six MiG-29s were shot down in 1999, of which three were shot down by USAF F-15s, one by a USAF F-16, and one by a RNAF F-16. One aircraft was hit by friendly fire from the ground. Another four were destroyed on the ground. During the course of the air war, Serbo-Montenegrin anti-aircraft defenses downed a USAF F-16C and an F-117 Nighthawk, the first stealth aircraft ever to be shot down in combat, along with dozens of UAVs.

== See also ==
- History of the Serbian Army
- Military history of Serbia

== Sources ==
- Blume, August G. (November 1993). "Histoire de l'aviation serbe (1ère partie)" [History of Serbian Aviation]. Avions: Toute l'aéronautique et son histoire (in French) (9): 35–38. ISSN 1243-8650.
- Blume, August G. (December 1993). "Histoire de l'aviation serbe (2ème partie)". Avions: Toute l'aéronautique et son histoire (in French) (10): 2–6. ISSN 1243-8650.
- Blume, August G. (January 1994). "Histoire de l'aviation serbe (3ème partie)". Avions: Toute l'aéronautique et son histoire (in French) (11): 14–18. ISSN 1243-8650.
- Janić, Čedomir; Petrović, Ognjan (2010). Век авијације у Србији 1910–2010: 225 значајних летилица. Belgrade: Аерокомуникације. ISBN 978-86-913973-0-2.
