= Mihajlo Petrović (pilot) =

Serbian military pilot (1884–1913)

Narednik Mihajlo Petrović
- Михајло Петровић
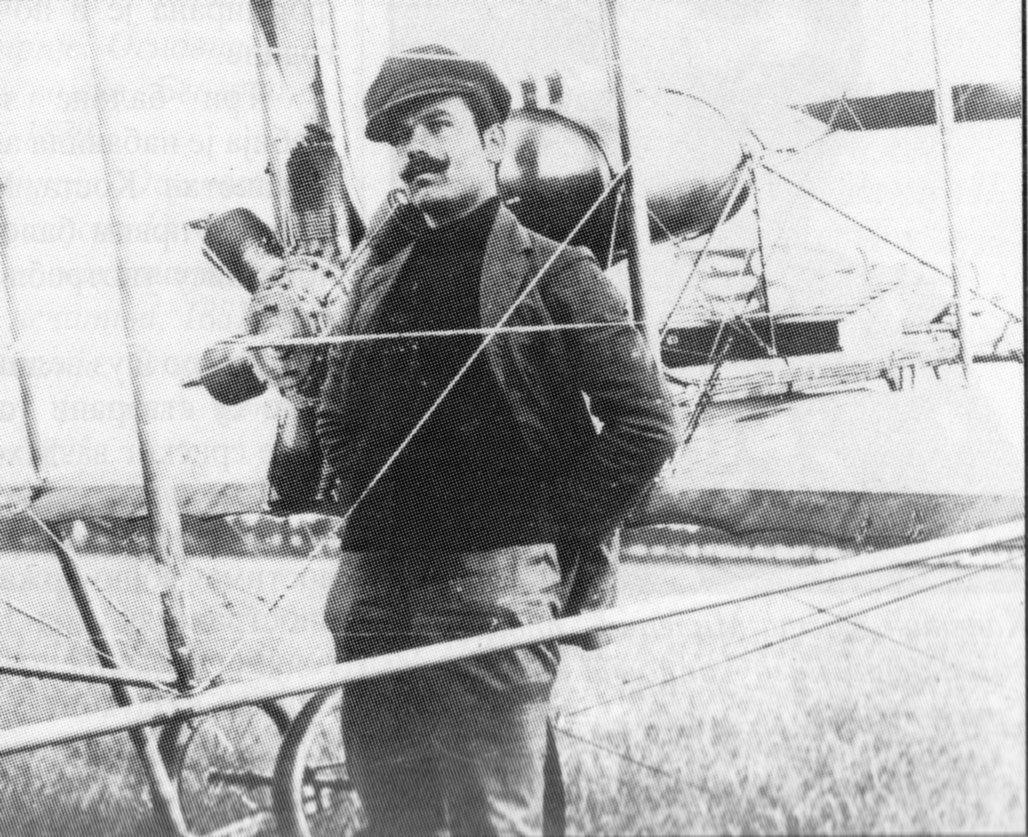
- Mihajlo Petrović
- Born: 26 June [O.S. 14 June] 1884; Vlakča, Kingdom of Serbia
- Died: 20 March [O.S. 7 March] 1913 (aged 28); Scutari, Ottoman Empire
- Military career
- Allegiance: (Kingdom of Serbia) Serbia
- Branch: Royal Serbian Army; Serbian Air Force
- Service years: 1905–1913
- Rank: Narednik
- Unit: Littoral Air Detachment
- Conflicts: Balkan Wars: Siege of Scutari †

Mihajlo Petrović (Serbian Cyrillic: Михајло Петровић; 26 June [O.S. 14 June] 1884 – 20 March [O.S. 7 March] 1913) was a Serbian military pilot who flew in the Balkan Wars of 1912–1913.

A graduate of Serbia's Military Academy, Petrović was one of six Serbian military personnel selected to undergo training at Henri and Maurice Farman's flying school in Étampes, near Paris, in 1912. Following his completion of the Farman brothers' training program, the Fédération Aéronautique Internationale issued Petrović with pilot's license #979, making him one of the first 1,000 pilots certified by the organization. Upon completing his training, Petrović returned to Serbia, together with the other newly certified Serbian pilots.

During the Siege of Scutari (modern-day Shkodër, Albania), Petrović was embedded with the nascent Serbian Air Force's newly formed Littoral Air Detachment, which was tasked with carrying out reconnaissance missions over the city and its surroundings. In March 1913, Petrović fell out of his Farman HF.20 while completing a mission over the city, and was killed. His death negatively affected the morale of his unit. Under pressure from the Great Powers, Montenegro and Serbia retreated from Scutari in May, the Littoral Air Detachment ceased conducting flights over the city and its pilots returned to Serbia.

Petrović was the first Serbian Air Force pilot to be killed in the line of duty and only the second such fatality in the history of military aviation. In September 2018, the air base adjacent to Niš Constantine the Great Airport was named after him.

== Biography ==
=== Early life and flight training ===
Mihajlo Petrović was born in the village of Vlakča, near Stragari, on 26 June [O.S. 14 June] 1884. He completed his primary education in his native village and later attended a military high school in Kragujevac, but failed to graduate. After only managing to secure menial work in Belgrade, Petrović travelled to Russia in 1902 and applied to a military academy in Saint Petersburg, but was not accepted. Upon returning to Serbia, he enrolled in Belgrade's Military Academy with the aim of becoming a non-commissioned officer in an artillery unit. He graduated from the Military Academy in 1905 as the best student in his class. His first posting was as a lieutenant (Serbian: Podnarednik) in Niš. He was later reassigned to Kragujevac and Belgrade. In 1910, he was promoted to the rank of sergeant (Serbian: Narednik).

In 1912, Petrović was among six recruits selected by the Royal Serbian Government to undergo training at Henri and Maurice Farman's flying school in Étampes, near Paris. They arrived in France in April of that year. The recruits were tested in flying their planes for one hour non-stop at an altitude over 100 metres (330 ft), landing at a predetermined airfield and gliding with a dead engine. Petrović made his first solo flight after only 20 days, and was the first of the recruits to fly without an instructor, on 29 May 1912. During the training process, the recruits incurred 13,000 francs worth of damage to their aircraft. The training they received did not encompass combat scenarios.

Following his completion of the training program, the Fédération Aéronautique Internationale issued Petrović with pilot's license #979, making him one of the first 1,000 pilots certified by the organization. According to the historian Boris Ciglić, Serbia initially purchased six aircraft; three from Blériot and three from Farman. Two more were subsequently purchased from Deperdussin, piloted by French aviators. According to the air historian Paul E. Fontenoy, the Serbian government purchased a total of 11 aircraft in 1912. The newly certified pilots requested that the Serbian government permit them to undergo combat training, during which they would be trained in flying at altitudes over 1,000 metres (3,300 ft), but the government declined. After three months, the pilots left France. They advised their superiors that it would be advisable for the government to procure the same types of aircraft they had received their flight training in. The government only partially obliged this request. Aircraft produced by Bleriot were procured for pilots who had trained on Bleriot planes. Pilots trained to fly planes produced by Maurice Farman instead received aircraft produced by Henri Farman. Petrović was among three pilots who were assigned a plane they were not trained to fly.

=== First Balkan War ===
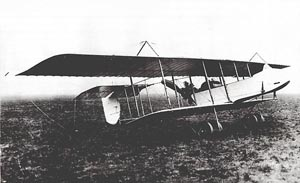
A Farman HF.20 biplane similar to the one in which Petrović was killed

The newly procured aircraft were to be transported to Serbia via Italy and Montenegro. By the time they had reached Montenegro, the First Balkan War had already broken out. The aircraft were transported to Salonika by ship, where they arrived in December 1912. By January 1913, the planes had arrived in Niš, where they were assembled and underwent their first domestic test flights. Four Frenchmen—three pilots and a mechanic—were enlisted to fly and maintain the aircraft alongside their Serbian counterparts.

Petrović began training on the Farman HF.20 reconnaissance biplane at Trupalsko polje, near Niš. He was subsequently assigned to the nascent Serbian Air Force's newly formed Littoral Air Detachment (Serbian: Primorski aeroplanski odred), which was taking part in the siege of Scutari (modern-day Shkodër, Albania). The detachment was tasked with flying reconnaissance missions over the city and its surroundings. Its commander was Major Kosta Miletić. On 4 March [O.S. 19 February] 1913, the detachment departed for Scutari from Salonika. Three foreign pilots, two Frenchmen and a Russian, accompanied it on its journey. The detachment's three planes—one Deperdussin, one Bleriot and one Farman—reached the port of Shëngjin several days later. From there the aircraft were transported to the village of Barbullush, near Scutari, where the detachment had established an operating base.

On the morning of 20 March [O.S. 7 March] 1913, captains Miloš Ilić and Živojin Stanković attempted to fly a reconnaissance mission, but were forced to turn back due to strong winds. Captain Jovan Jugović decided to complete Ilić and Stanković's mission, but strong winds forced him to abort as well. Two different accounts exist of the circumstances that led to Petrović's death. By one account, Petrović was confident he would not be affected by the wind and readied his plane. The flight was approved by Miletić. Before Petrović took off, Ilić warned him not to fly above 800 metres (2,600 ft), above which altitude wind would begin to affect the aircraft; while Petrović agreed not to do so, his plane rose above that altitude regardless. At 10:35 a.m., a strong gust of wind tilted the aircraft at an angle, and the untethered Petrović was pushed out of his seat and fell 1,200 metres (3,900 ft) to his death. The pilotless Farman HF.20 crashed and was damaged beyond repair. According to the second account, Petrović and Miletić took off as pilot and observer, and successfully completed their mission. Descending towards Barbullush, Miletić shut off the plane's engine and attempted to glide to a landing. The aircraft suddenly went into a spin and Petrović was thrown from the plane, falling to his death on the banks of the Drin River.

Military medics quickly arrived at the site where Petrović had fallen, but he was declared dead at the scene, and buried the following day near Barbullush. His death negatively affected the morale of his unit.

== Legacy ==
Petrović is considered the first Serbian Air Force pilot to have been killed in the line of duty. He was also only the second fatality in military aviation history. Under pressure from the Great Powers, Montenegro and Serbia retreated from Scutari in May 1913, the Littoral Air Detachment ceased conducting flights over the city and its pilots returned to Serbia.

After the Balkan Wars, Petrović's remains were exhumed and reburied in the Montenegrin capital, Cetinje. On 1 October 1931, his remains were exhumed once again, and transported to Belgrade's New Cemetery, where they are now interred. The house in which Petrović was born is still standing, and is marked with a commemorative plaque. Belgrade's Aeronautical Museum contains 76 of Petrović's personal possessions, some of which are on display. In September 2018, the Serbian Air Force base adjacent to Niš Constantine the Great Airport was named after him.

== See also ==
- Miodrag Tomić
