= History of the Serbian Army =

The history of the Serbian Army dates back to the early 19th century.

== Serbian Revolutionary Army (1804–1817) ==
During the 18th century, Serbs had fought the Ottomans as auxiliaries to the Austrian army on both sides of the Ottoman border, and had been important in defending the 20-year Habsburg rule over Belgrade and the northern parts of Serbia. The return of Ottoman rule after the Treaty of Swistowa between Austria and Ottoman empires did not mean the end of Serbs serving under arms as the Sultan needed a Serb militia to oppose Janissary corps in Serbia. This ended when the Janissaries got the upper hand and took power under a junta of four known as the dahis.

The overthrow of the Dahis was nominally in the name of the Sultan but in fact was the work of an uprising of Serbs led by Karađorđe with only token support from troops sent by the Sultan. That Belgrade had fallen to Serb forces put them in a strong negotiating position with the Sultan and consequently what the Serbs expected in terms of autonomy was more than the Sultan was able to offer

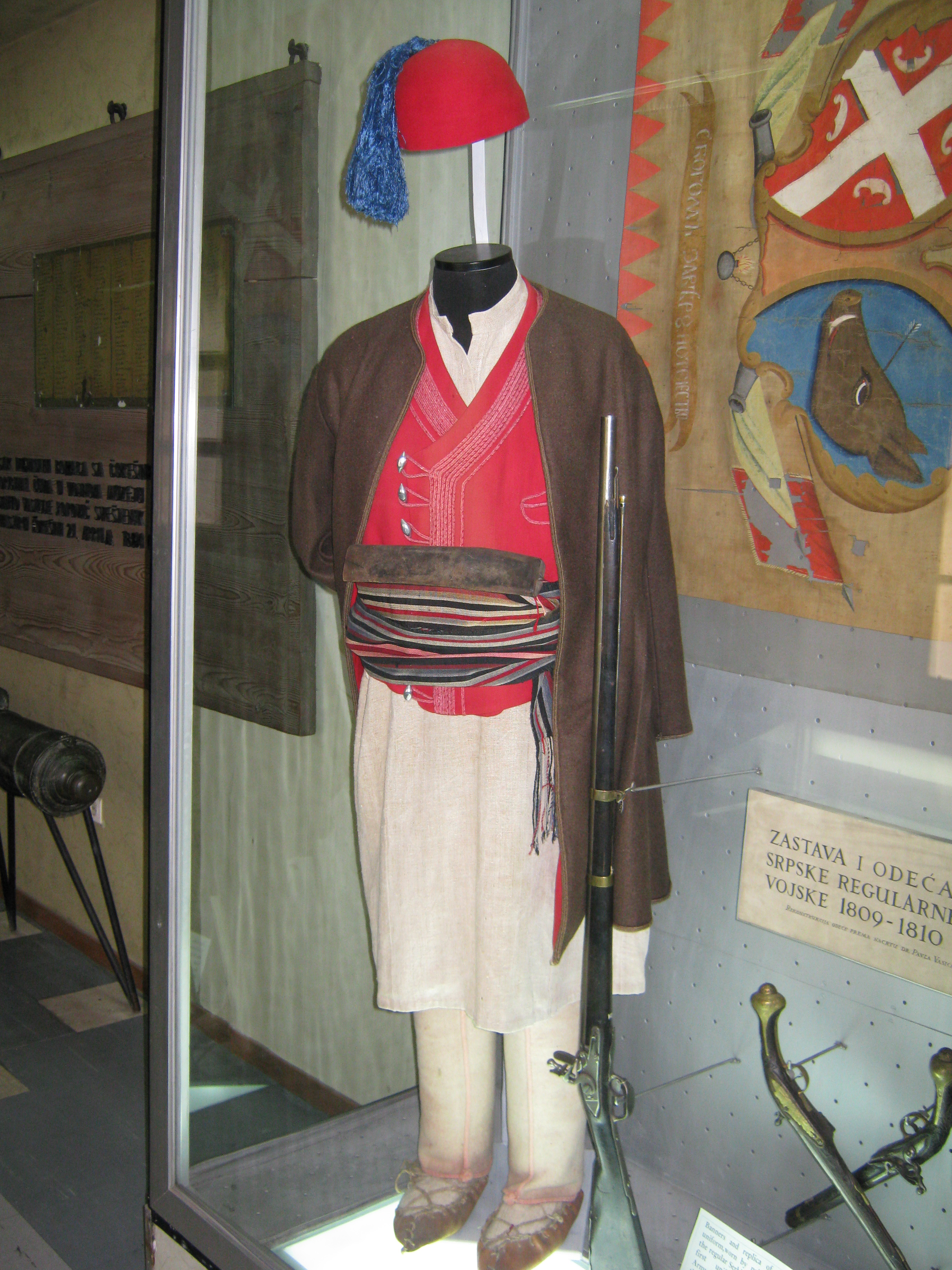
Serbian Revolutionary Army uniform and weapons, 1809/10.

The final break with Istanbul came with the Battle of Ivankovac in which the Serbs were victorious. This was followed by further victories at Misar and Deligrad. Serbian rebel army was small in number but used sconce fortress to battle Ottoman numerical superiority. The rebels not only defeated the Ottoman army, but also inadvertently Napoleon himself who equipped and instructed the Ottoman army to strike from three sides, and who saw every withdrawal of the Ottoman army as the advancement of Russia. Though allies in ideology, Austrians also feared Russian intentions. Russia preferred to see the Balkan peninsula divided and the Serbian uprising as an incentive to the Greek Liberation Movement. Unaware of the rules of top politics, as early as February 1806 Serbs appealed to the Russian Tzar to support their right to the national state in the Balkan provinces where they could rise the army of up to 200,000 men. Serbian leaders recognized the importance of strategic factors, the role of the army and security challenges of those times while making decisions.

In 1808 the creation of a single regiment of infantry and another of mounted cavalry, marked the creation of the first uniformed and fully equipped regular Serbian forces. This Russian backed force was dissolved in 1813 following the termination of the First Serbian Uprising.

After their refusal to accept the terms of Russian-Ottoman Treaty, the Serbian army suffered defeat in 1813. Russia, which was in expectation of another invasion of Napoleon, signed an agreement in Bucharest, which was rather indefinite for the Serbs.

It was up to them now to agree with the Ottomans on tax rates and the sale of weapons. The Ottomans were to reestablish the former garrisons. The hajduks (outlaws also freedom fighters) were allowed to flee to Russia and Germany, while Russia designated Austria as the protector of Serbia's autonomy, the country whose Chancellor supported the Ottoman Empire. At the national assembly in Kragujevac, where the elders refused this offer, it was stressed that “this land belonged to our forefathers and that we have redeemed it with our blood”. If a Russian has promised the Ottoman fortifications, he will have to deliver them some other fortifications”.

The commitment of the soldiers and their commanders lasted until the very last moment in face of a larger enemy force, which the Ottomans would remember well. The very thought of this and the possibility of seeing this again made the Ottomans yield later on. When the new uprising broke out in 1815, they were more ready to yield.

During the uprisings the Serbian army was of the ethnic character. The leaders of the Serbian army drafted farmers only when a battle was ahead. They provided equipment and weapons themselves. In addition to this mass of fighters drafted on call, during the first Serbian revolutionary statehood there were standing regiments of skilled and armed lads who were paid for their service. They were called bećari or lads, and they served as some sort of security for the Karađorđe and other dukes. They protected fortifications and secured borders.

Prince Miloš Obrenović following the Second Serbian Uprising disbanded the army but it was not disarmed. Though it was not until King Milan I cancelled this Swiss system of armed reserve corps, the peasants of Timok Valley refused to lay down their arms and started an uprising which the standing army would soon suppress.

== Armed Forces of the Principality of Serbia (1830–1882) ==
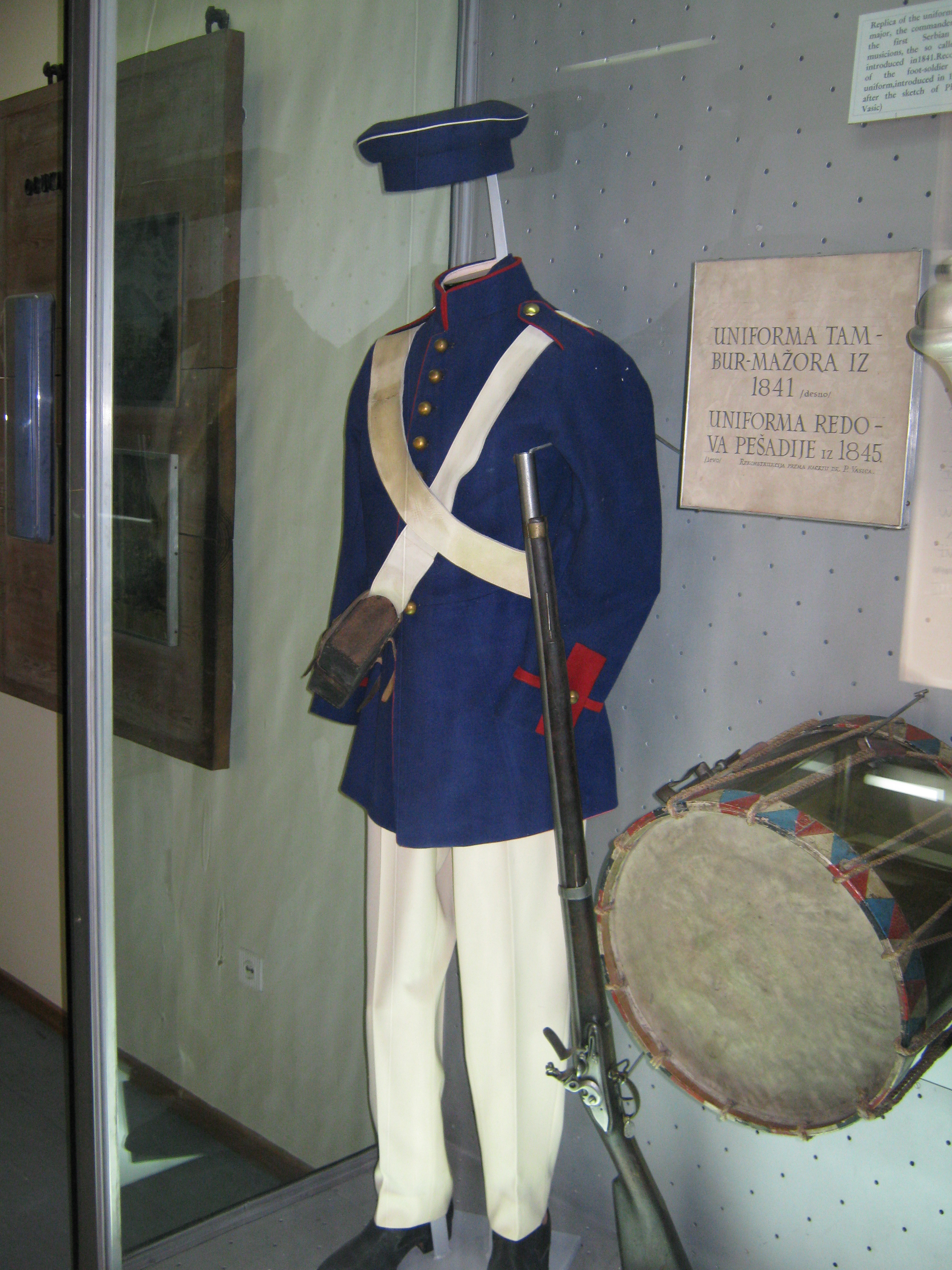
Infantry uniform,1845

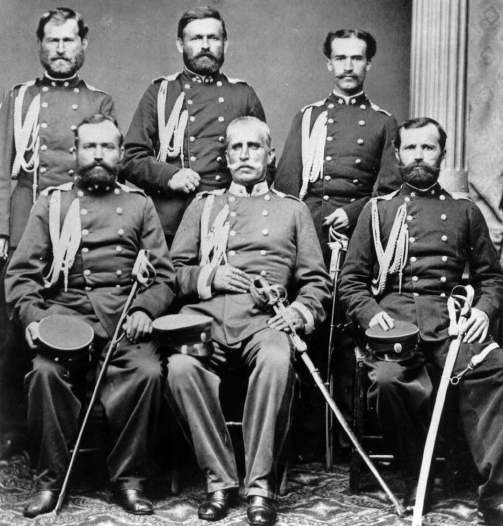
Group of officers, 1865

A small army was established in 1830 after the Russian victory over the Ottomans in the Russo-Turkish War (1828–29), and the signing of the Treaty of Adrianople l, which re-guaranteed the autonomy of Serbia as per the earlier Akkerman Convention. Serbia's professional army came out of the personal guard that Prince Miloš Obrenović created in 1830. The first army law of 1839 established that force to 4,000 soldiers and 63 officers. With the Treaty of Adrianople, Russia gained patronage over the Serbian Army and thus had impact on its development, with most officers attending military schools in Russia. In the period 1830–1835 an infantry battalion, equine squadron and a gun battery were formed. The first group of 12 youths was sent to Russia to be educated as officers. The first Law on the Establishment of Garrison Army was adopted in 1838. By the end of 1847 the standing army of Serbia barely totaled 2,438 officers, professional military members and soldiers. The infantry was augmented by another battalion consisting of four companies. A military academy known as the Artillery School was created in 1850, its first students graduated in 1855. In 1860 junior Serbian officers came from the Austro-Hungarian Army into Serbian Army. Also other civilians, mostly Slovenians, doctors, engineers, musicians and branch officers, came into Serbian Army. In 1867, Serbia adopted the Law on Accepting Foreign Officers.

France gained a predominant influence on the development of the Serbian Army, while Prussia had less influence following its victory over Napoleon III. On the other hand, the vested interests of France in Serbian Army because of the Crimea War led to close cooperation on building a gun factory and on staff education. Those established relations would lead to appointing a Frenchman Hippolyte Monden Minister of the Army. It was Monden who actually established the Army Ministry, and under his competences fell the Ministry of Civil Engineering as bridges, roads, water supply systems and later railway system were a prerequisite in all European countries for mobilization and military operations. Russian laws and regulations were substituted with French or were somewhat tailored to suit Serbian circumstances. Pension funds for officers and NCOs were established, health care service was reorganized, and horse breeding as a prerequisite for raising the army was improved. The Serbian National Assembly adopted a Law on National Army. Only the French posit their trust in this army of 100–150,000 soldiers who had reports from Monden as well as experiences in Crimea wars and Garibaldi's operations. The national army, now equipped with numerous artillery weapons, made visible progress thanks to the nation's zeal.

== Royal Serbian Army (1882–1918) ==
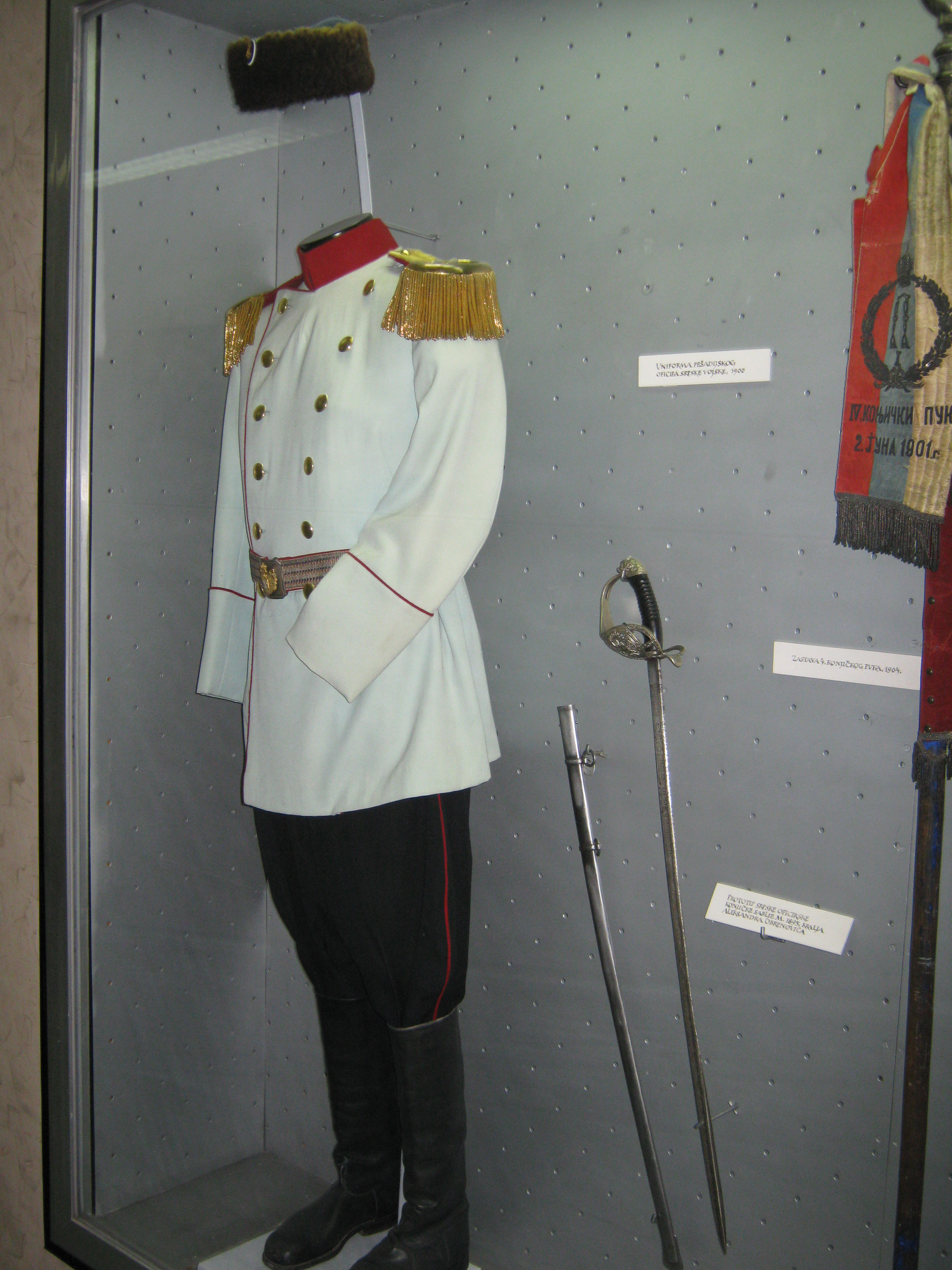
Uniform of infantry officer, 1900

Following the defeat in the Serbo-Bulgarian War in 1885, King Milan I became the military commander in chief of then Royal Serbian Army and initiated the most important reform which set foundations for future military successes in the liberation wars of 1912–1918.

At the beginning of the 20th century the Royal Serbian Army was reorganized in accordance to newly adopted 1901 Law of the Organization of the Military. According to the law all males between 17 and 50 years were subjects of military service, army was divided into National army composed of men of age between 20 and 45 years, and Last defense troops composed of youths of age between 17 and 20 years and veterans between 45 and 50 years. The National army was further divided into three age classes called poziv (literally call). The troops of I call or class were composed of men aged 20–37, II call or class of men 31–37 and finally III call or class of men aged 37–45 years. The army was divided into five divisional areas: Morava divisional area (regimental districts: Vranje, Prokuplje, Pirot), Drina divisional area (regimental districts: Užice, Valjevo, Šabac), Dunav divisional area (regimental districts: Beograd, Smederevo), Šumadija divisional area (regimental districts: Čačak, Kragujevac, Kruševac), and Timok divisional area (regimental districts: Zaječar, Knjaževac, Negotin). Divisions were named by divisional area and class, e.g. Drina division I class/call, regiments were called by branch, ordinary number, class and sometimes by specific name First infantry regiment of the 1st class Miloš Veliki. Consequently, the divisions and regiments were doubled and their names differed only by class they belonged to Drina division I class and Drina division II class. Divisional areas were further subdivided into 3 regimental districts, each of which was further subdivided into battalion districts. Organizationally each divisional area provided: 1 I class infantry division of 4 infantry regiments, 1 II class infantry division of 3 infantry regiments and 3 III class infantry regiments each. Accordingly, the total strength of fully mobilized army would be 5 I class infantry divisions (20 infantry regiments), 5 II class infantry divisions (15 infantry regiments ) and 15 III class infantry regiments. There was also one cavalry division which was recruited from all divisional areas, as well as various independent artillery, engineering and other units. The divisions could have up to 28,000 soldiers, depending on the size of cavalry regiment and replacement units which varied from division to division. II poziv (class) infantry divisions had 3 infantry regiment, artillery battalion (divizion) with 12 guns and cavalry squadron, totally about 15–17,000 men.

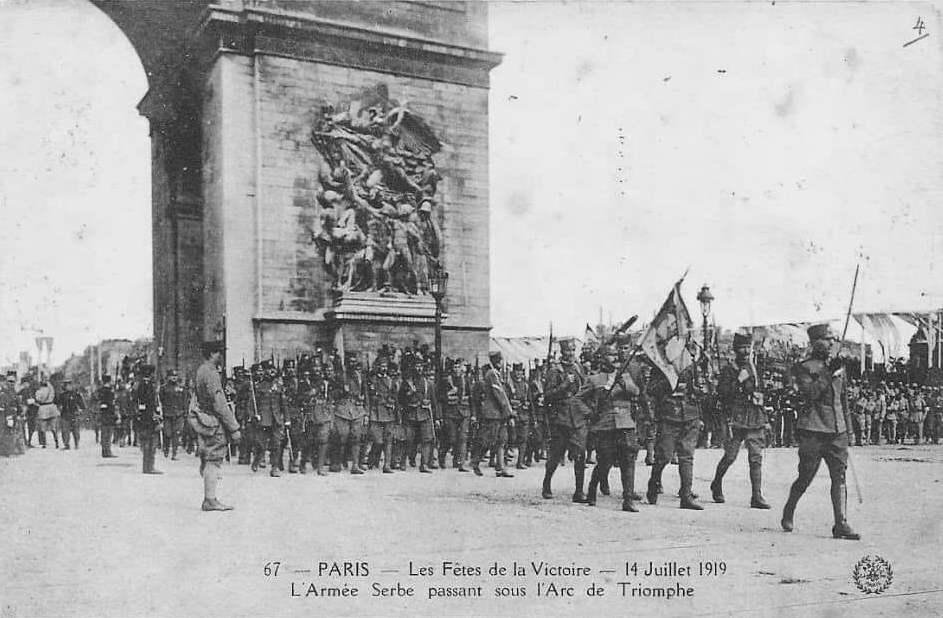
Serbian Army marching at the Arc de Triomphe as one of the victorious Allied Powers in World War I.

Military service in peacetime lasted between 14 and 18 months for infantry and between 16 and 24 months for artillery and cavalry. Finally there were 5 supernumerary infantry regiments made of surplus unassigned personnel of all divisional areas. They were used to reinforce II class inf divisions to 4 regiment standard or they formed independent infantry brigades with additional artillery and cavalry units. Before World War I they formed a combined infantry division.

The only professional part of military was a 3,000-strong officer's and NCOs corps which conducted the training of conscripts, which numbered approximately 40,000 every year. They formed 20 training regiments (4 in each divisional area) called cadre regiments. In wartime the bulk of the officers and NCOs were drawn from reserve personnel with limited military education.

In the eve of Balkan Wars Serbian Royal Army was armed with German made Mauser M1899 rifles (7×57mm Mauser) as main infantry weapon of I and II class troops and with older Russian made Berdan II rifles for III class troops. Main machine gun was German Maxim M1908 7 mm machine gun. Main artillery weapon was French made Schneider M1907 75 mm field gun also made in mountain version, beside this type the III class regiments operated several batteries of outdated slow-loading French made De Bange M85 80 mm field guns. Heavy artillery consisted of 22 outdated Schneider M1897 120 mm slow-loading howitzers, 12 Schneider M1897 120mm long guns, and 6 slow-loading Schneider-Canet M1897 150 mm mortars. During the Balkan wars and right before First world war Serbian army also acquired number of modern heavy guns: 32 Schneider-Canet 120mm M.1910 and 8 Schnaider-Canet 150mm M.1910.

== Yugoslav armies (1918–2006) ==
Serbian military activity after World War I took place in the context of various Yugoslav armies until the breakup of Yugoslavia in the 1990s and the restoration of Serbia as an independent state in 2006.

== Gallery ==
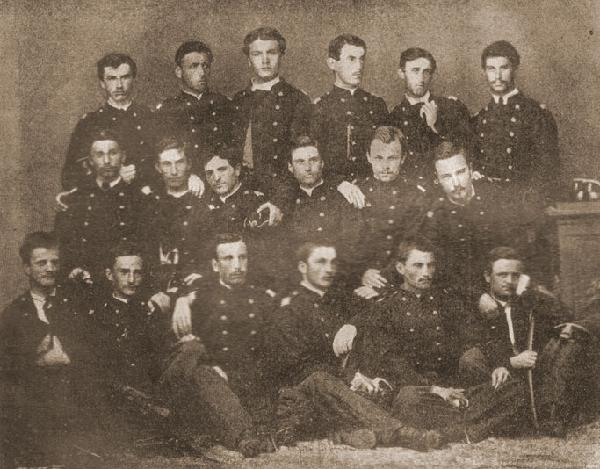
Cadets, 1861

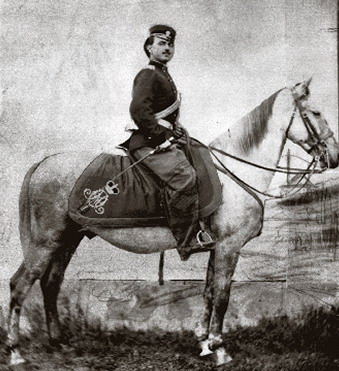
Cavalry officer, 1865

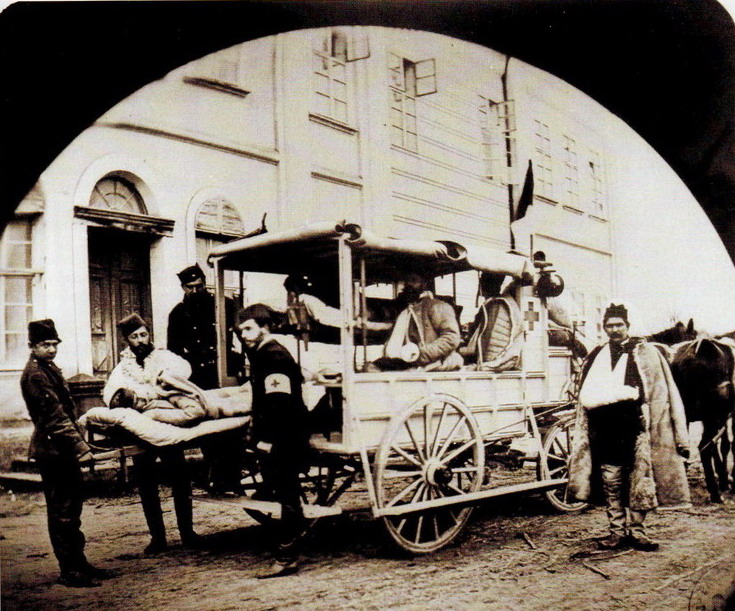
Health-care car during the Serbo-Turkish War (1876–1878)
The Guard, late 19th century

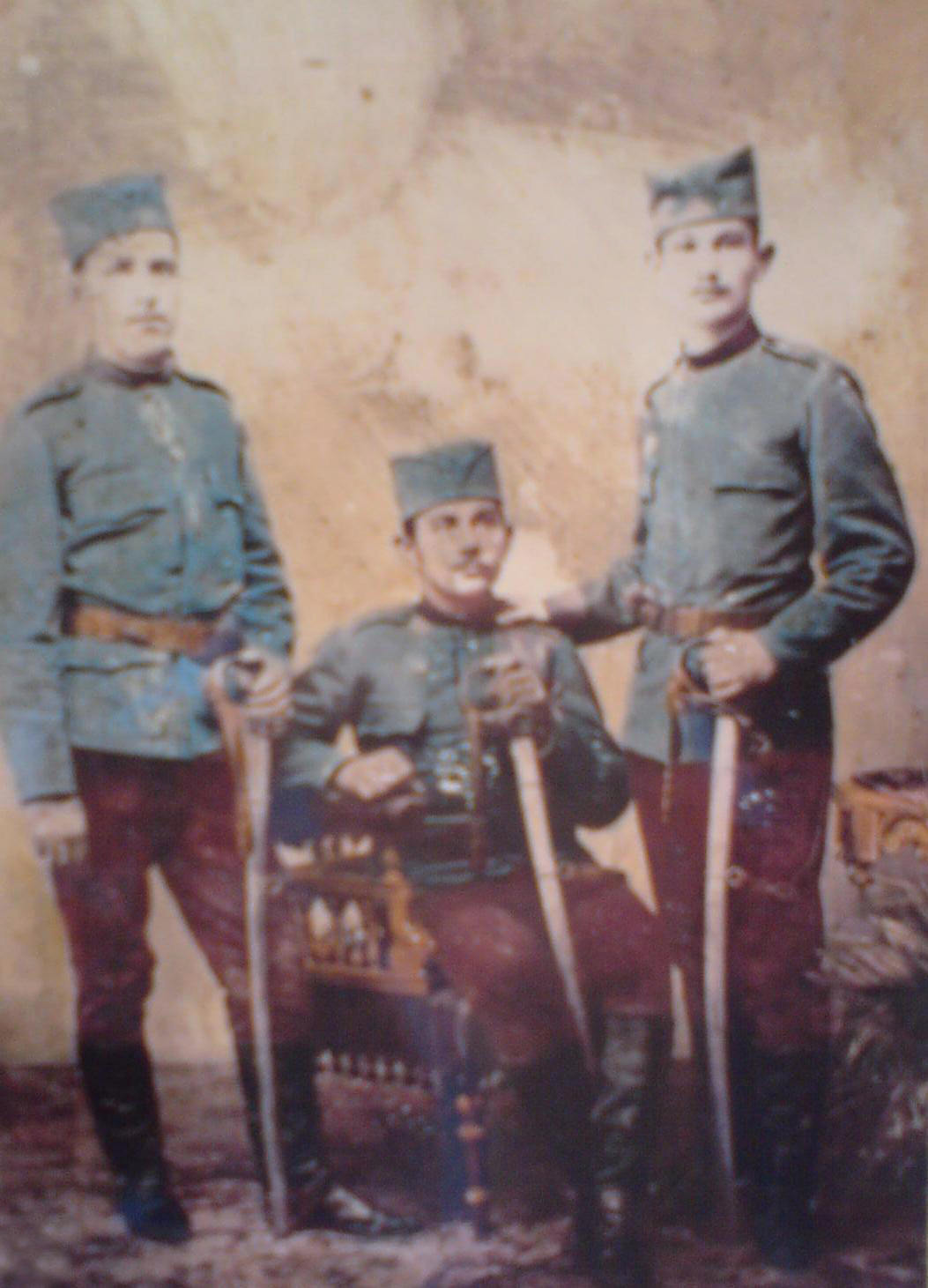
Conscripts, 1901

Infantry Regiment "King Peter", 1910

== See also ==
- History of the Serbian Air Force
- Military history of Serbia

== Sources ==
- Babac, D. (2015). The Serbian Army in the Wars for Independence Against Turkey, 1876-1878. Helion. ISBN 978-1-909982-24-6.
- Bodrožić, Đuro (2022). "Vojska i država: počeci moderne srpske vojske". Nacionalni Interes. 44 (2): 29–46. doi:10.22182/ni.4222022.2 (inactive 23 July 2025).
- Bjelajac, Mile (2015). "Tradicija". O Vojsci. Vojska Srbije. Archived from the original on 2016-01-05.
- Milićević, Milić J. (2019). "ГУБИЦИ СТАРЕШИНСКОГ КАДРA СРПСКЕ ВОЈСКЕ (ВОЈСКЕ СРБИЈЕ) У РАТОВИМА 19. ВЕКА". Vojnoistorijski glasnik. 2: 9–21.
- Pavlović, Iv. S. (1936). Vojna granica i srpska vojska (in Serbian). Štamparija Drag. Gregorića.
- Stokes, G. (1990). Politics as Development: The Emergence of Political Parties in Nineteenth-century Serbia. Duke University Press. ISBN 978-0-8223-1016-7.
- Vasić, Pavle (1980). Uniforme srpske vojske: 1808–1918. Jugoslavija.
