= Miodrag Tomić =

Serbian pilot

Colonel Miodrag Tomić
- Миодраг Томић
- Miodrag Tomić
- Born: 17 May [O.S. 5 May] 1888; Stragari, Kingdom of Serbia
- Died: 20 February 1962 (aged 73); Chicago, Illinois
- Spouse: Danica Tomić
- Military career
- Allegiance: Kingdom of Serbia; Kingdom of Yugoslavia
- Branch: Serbian Army; Serbian Air Force; Royal Yugoslav Air Force
- Service years: 1905–1941
- Rank: Colonel
- Commands: Novi Sad Pursuit Squadron
- Conflicts: First Balkan War; Second Balkan War; World War I World War II

Miodrag Tomić (Serbian Cyrillic: Миодраг Томић; 17 May [O.S. 5 May] 1888 – 20 February 1962) was a Serbian and Yugoslav military pilot who flew during the Balkan Wars and World War I.

Tomić belonged to the first class of six Serbian pilots trained in France in 1912. In August 1914, he participated in the first aerial dogfight of the war, when he exchanged gunfire with an Austro-Hungarian plane over western Serbia. In the winter of 1915, during the Serbian Army's retreat across Albania to the Greek island of Corfu, he evacuated General Petar Bojović from Scutari by plane, delivered mail by air and transported the Serbian Government's gold and hard currency reserves from Niš to keep them from falling into enemy hands. Following the occupation of Serbia by the Central Powers, Tomić went to France and flew over the Western Front, where he had one confirmed kill. He returned to the Balkans in late 1916, conducted combat missions over Bulgarian-occupied Macedonia and shot down one enemy plane.

Tomić continued flying after the war and became head of the Royal Yugoslav Air Force's pursuit squadron in Novi Sad. During World War II, he was captured by the Germans and detained as a prisoner of war. Tomić left Yugoslavia following the war and settled in the United States with his wife. He died in Chicago in 1962.

== Early life, education and the Balkan Wars ==
Miodrag Tomić was born on 17 May [O.S. 5 May] 1888 in the village of Stragari, near Kragujevac. Matrilineally, he was a descendant of Serbian warlord Tanasko Rajić, who was killed fighting the Ottomans during the First Serbian Uprising. Tomić finished primary school and gymnasium in Kragujevac. In 1905, he enrolled into non-commissioned officers' school. He graduated successfully and became a member of King Peter's Royal Guard. Serbia had been the first country in the Balkans to take interest in aerial warfare. Shortly after Austria-Hungary's annexation of Bosnia-Herzegovina in 1908, Serbia purchased two German reconnaissance balloons. In 1912, prior to the First Balkan War, it sent six soldiers to France to receive pilots' training and ordered 11 French planes. On 29 April 1912, Tomić was sent to France to attend Louis Blériot's flying school in Étampes, near Paris. He graduated on 1 October 1912, after four months of training, and was issued diploma #1026. This made him one of Serbia's first military pilots.

By the time Tomić had returned home, Serbia was embroiled in the Balkan Wars. On 24 December 1912, the Serbian Aviation Command was established in Niš. Tomić was actively involved in the siege of Scutari. On 29 March 1913, Sergeant Tomić and Lieutenant Živojin Stanković spent 45 minutes flying over Scutari at a height of 2,200 metres (7,200 ft) and spying on Ottoman positions. In July 1913, Tomić flew several flights over Bulgaria, conducting reconnaissance missions and dropping small bombs. At the end of the Balkan Wars, the Royal Serbian Army promoted Tomić to the rank of second lieutenant.

== World War I ==
At the outbreak of World War I, the Royal Serbian Army had only three planes, one of which was piloted by Tomić. His plane was quite primitive even for 1914. Misha Glenny, a journalist who has written extensively on the Balkans, likens it to "a box kite on perambulator wheels". At the beginning of the war, Tomić was attached to the 1st Danube Division. On the afternoon of 12 August 1914, he flew a reconnaissance mission over Šabac, and disclosed to the Serbian High Command that, contrary to initial reports, the Austro-Hungarians had not set up pontoon bridges on the Sava and were attempting to cross the river with boats. On 15 August, Tomić encountered an enemy plane while conducting a reconnaissance flight over Austria-Hungary. The Austro-Hungarian aviator initially waved at Tomić, who waved back. The enemy pilot then took a revolver and began shooting at Tomić's plane. Tomić produced a pistol of his own and fired back. He swerved away from the Austro-Hungarian plane and the two aircraft eventually parted ways. This incident is considered the first recorded dogfight of the war. Within weeks, all Serbian and Austro-Hungarian aircraft were armed. The Serbians equipped their planes with 8-millimetre (0.31 in) Schwarzlose MG M.07/12 machine guns, six 100-round boxes of ammunition and several bombs. The first armed Serbian plane was given the name OЛУЈ (Oluj), or "storm". It was mostly flown by Tomić.

Tomić was ordered to form an aerial unit of the Šumadija Division on 16 August. On 22 October, he became the first Serbian pilot to face enemy anti-aircraft fire when his Blériot XI was targeted by Austro-Hungarian field batteries. The first Serbian escadrille was formed in Belgrade the same day. Tomić went on to participate in multiple combat missions, dropping explosive ordnance on Austro-Hungarian military positions and supply lines. In May 1915, a number of French pilots came to Serbia to help the country's war effort. Tomić was assigned to Požarevac airfield following the arrival of the French and flew missions over the Banat. A soldier named Milutin Mihailović was assigned to fly with him as a military observer. On 9 June, Tomić downed one German plane. Six days later, he was promoted to the rank of lieutenant. He shot down another German plane on 23 June. In total, Tomić and Mihailović flew nineteen combat missions over the Banat between early May and late August 1915.

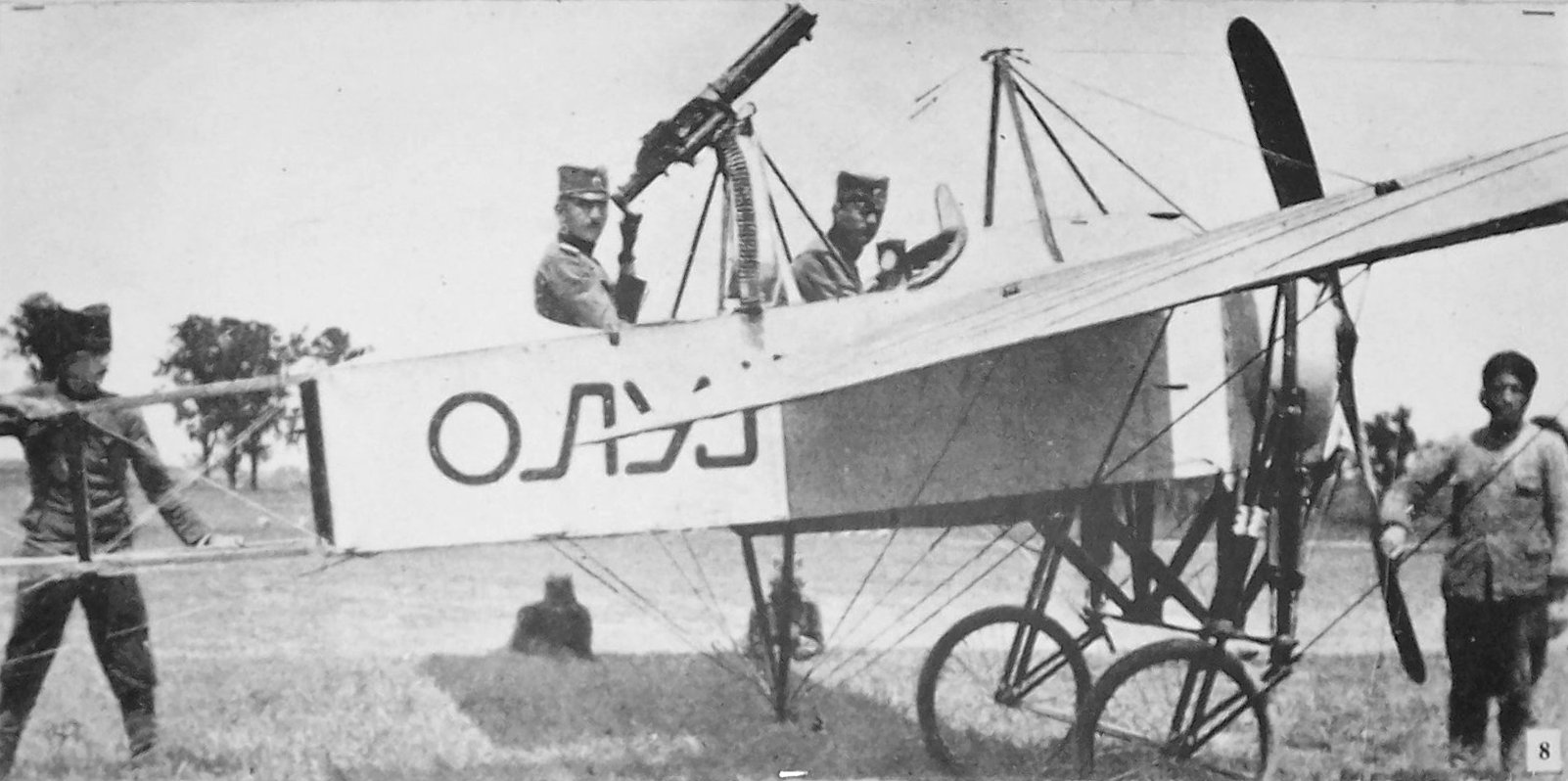
Tomić and observer Milutin Mihailović seated in their Blériot XI military airplane, c. 1915

In October 1915, Serbia was invaded by a combined Austro-Hungarian, Bulgarian and German force. The Serbian Army was overwhelmed within weeks and forced to retreat across Albania to the Greek island of Corfu. The small Serbian Air Force withdrew from its headquarters in Banjica to Kruševac via Mladenovac, Smederevska Palanka and Jagodina. In Kruševac, Tomić and lieutenant Živojin Stanković were tasked with destroying four obsolete planes to keep them from falling into enemy hands. Upon completing the task, Tomić and Stanković manned two small biplanes and headed for Peć. Tomić successfully reached Kosovo, but Stanković did not. His plane crashed near the town of Kuršumlija, leaving him seriously injured. Tomić continued south, successfully transporting the Serbian Government's gold reserves out of Niš and ensuring they did not fall into the hands of the Central Powers. He also flew important mail in and out of Serbia, and evacuated the country's hard currency reserves. In Kosovo, Tomić contracted typhus. On 19 November, he and aerial mechanic Miloje Milekić landed in Prizren. They spent the next two days wandering the countryside and walking through knee-deep snow. During the day, the air temperature reached −40 °C (−40 °F). The two stayed near their plane, waiting for orders from the Serbian High Command. On 21 November, Tomić and Milekić received orders to destroy their plane and go to Albania on foot. They decided against destroying the Blériot XI and took off the following morning, headed for Durrës. The Blériot XI was designed to fly for a maximum of four hours, but Tomić managed to keep it flying for the duration of the four-and-a-half hour flight to Durrës and landed safely on a field near the town. Locals soon discovered the plane and escorted Tomić and Milekić to Serbian envoy Panta Gavrilović. Tomić recovered from his ordeal and later evacuated General Petar Bojović from Scutari to Lezhë. Heavy winds over the town caused Tomić's plane to crash on 23 January 1916. He escaped unharmed.

While the Serbian Army recovered on Corfu, Tomić was assigned to the Western Front and flew with a French escadrille—Escadrille 389. During his time in France, he successfully downed one German plane. Colonel Dushé, the C.O. of the Serbian Air Force, commended Tomić on 16 November 1916. Tomić soon returned to the Balkans, ready to conduct aerial missions on the Salonika front. He flew a Nieuport 23 fighter on a number of combat missions over Bulgarian-occupied Macedonia as part of Escadrille 387. At about 10 a.m. on 17 April 1917, Tomić and his escadrille attacked a group of 14 Bulgarian planes conducting a bombing raid against the Serbian rear. His plane sustained serious damage during the encounter; it was struck by a number of incendiary bullets and its fuel line was severed. Unable to continue flying, Tomić was forced to land near Demir Kapija. In another aerial confrontation on 8 July, he successfully shot down a Bulgarian plane. This was Tomić's first recorded kill in Salonika, and his fourth overall. He was commended for this feat on 12 July, by order of the Serbian High Command. Following the Allied breakthrough in Macedonia, Tomić and his escadrille landed at Novi Sad, after which he was promoted to the rank of captain.

== World War II, emigration and death ==
Tomić remained in the armed forces after the war, serving with the Royal Yugoslav Air Force and becoming the commander of the Novi Sad pursuit squadron. In the 1920s, he achieved the rank of colonel. He married a woman named Danica, who later also became a pilot. In April 1941, Tomić was captured as a prisoner of war during the German-led Axis invasion of Yugoslavia. Following World War II, he and his wife emigrated to the United States. Tomić died in Chicago on 20 February 1962, and was survived by his sister in Yugoslavia. He is buried in Libertyville, Illinois.

== See also ==
- Jovan Jugović
- Mihajlo Petrović (pilot)
