= Veliki Šenj =

Coordinates: 44°06′N 20°44′E

Veliki Šenj Велики Шењ (Serbian)
- Village
- Interactive map of Veliki Šenj
- Country: Serbia
- District: Šumadija District
- Municipality: Stragari

Population (2002)
  - Total: 350
- Time zone: UTC+1 (CET)
  - Summer (DST): UTC+2 (CEST)

Veliki Šenj is a village in the municipality of Stragari, Serbia. According to the 2002 census, the village has a population of 350 people.
