= Novi Sad Airfield =

Airfield in Novi Sad, Serbia

Novi Sad Airfield Čenej Airfield
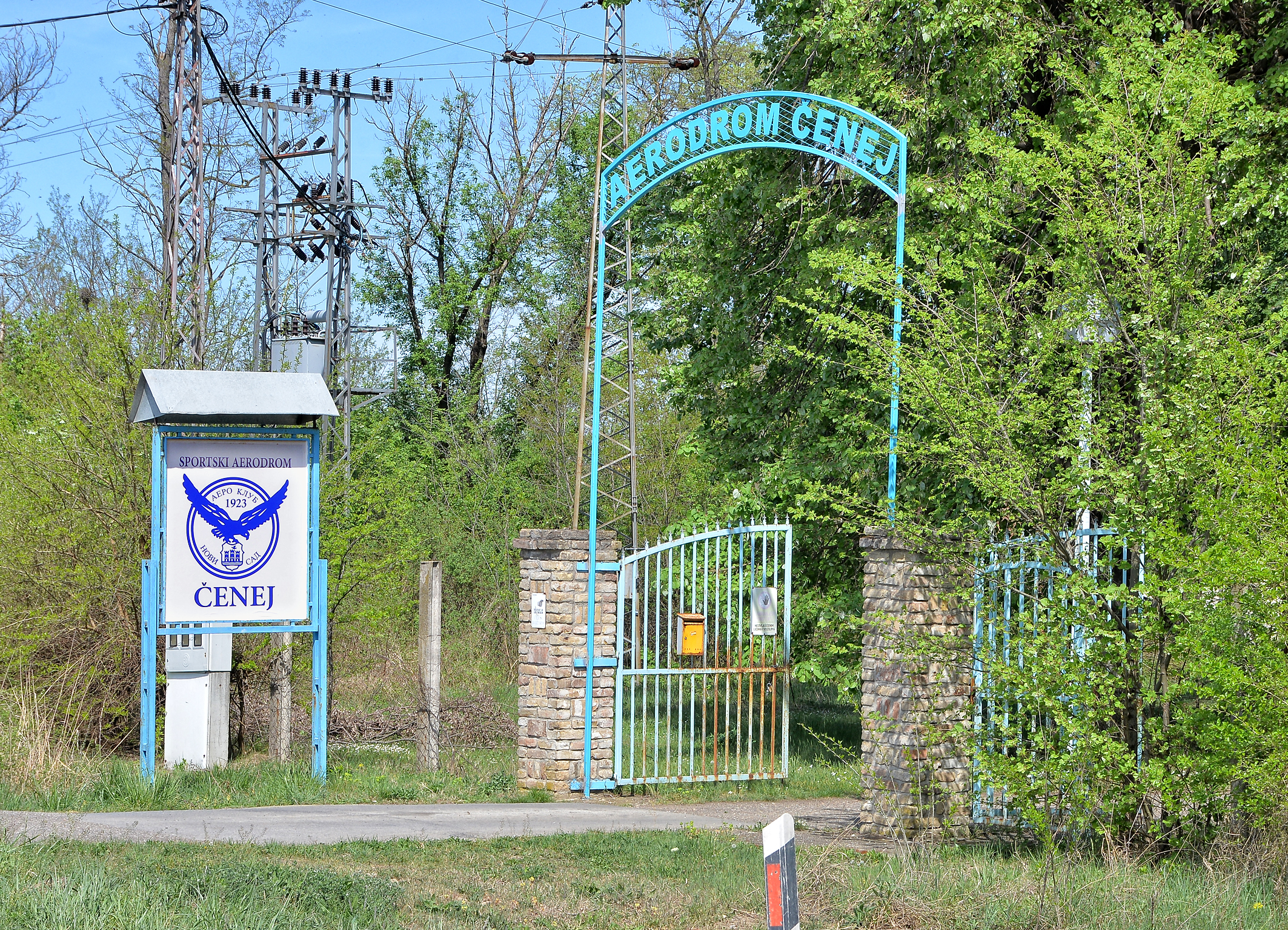
- Entrance to Čenej Airfield, 2024.
- IATA: none; ICAO: LYNS

Summary
- Airport type: Civil
- Owner: City of Novi Sad
- Operator: Aero Club Novi Sad
- Serves: Novi Sad
- Location: Međunarodni put 257, Čenej, Vojvodina, Serbia
- Elevation AMSL: 265 ft (81 m)
- Coordinates: 45°23′08.67″N 19°50′02.01″E
- Website: aerodromnovisad.com

Map
- Location within Serbia

Runways
| Direction | Length | | Surface |
| Direction | ft | m | Surface |
|---|---|---|---|
| 14/32 | 4,921.26 | 1.500 | Grass |

Novi Sad Airfield (Serbian: Аеродром Нови Сад / Aerodrom Novi Sad) (ICAO: LYNS), also known as Čenej Airfield (Serbian: Аеродром Ченеј / Aerodrom Čenej), is located near the village of Čenej, 16 km (10 mi) north of the city of Novi Sad. The airfield is mostly used for sport and agriculture, operated by Aero Club Novi Sad (Serbian: Аеро-клуб Нови Сад / Aero-klub Novi Sad).

Over the years there have been many plans to open the airfield to civilian traffic, such as low-cost flights to Europe, but little to no progress has been made.

== History ==
=== First Novi Sad Airfield ===
The history of aviation in Novi Sad began over a century ago. The first city airfield was opened in 1913 in what is today the Jugovićevo neighborhood. Back then the airfield did not have a name and was exclusively used for military use by the Austro-Hungarian Armed Forces. Initially, the airfield had only grass runways for military aircraft to land and take off of, while the hangars were in neighboring Sajlovo. In 1916, airport facilities, barracks and technical workshops were built here. A Serbian squadron found 11 wooden hangars here when it landed on French planes after the liberation of Serbia in November 1918. After World War I it was in the service of the Royal Yugoslav Army. Later, six brick hangars were erected, followed by headquarters, aeroplane workshops, officers' quarters, etc. At that time the city was the center of the Yugoslav aircraft industry, with an airplane factory opened there in 1920, along with a weather station in September of that year. Since 1924, the airport has celebrated the aviation Slava of Saint Elijah (August 2nd), and since 1926 the King's Cup competition has been held regularly on the birthday of Crown Prince Peter on September 6.

In 1928 the airfield was named Jugovićevo in honour of Yugoslav Airforce commander Jovan Jugović who had died two years prior. This airport was also the location of the first Yugoslavian pilot school, along with schools for reserve aviation officers, scouts, aircraft mechanics, and other specialist purposes.

During World War II, at the beginning of the Invasion of Yugoslavia in 1941, the airport would be bombed by the German Air Force. After the occupation of Bačka, the Germans built a 800-metre-long concrete runway and used the airport to fly and service planes intended for the Eastern Front. The Red Army and the socialist Yugoslav army (Narodnooslobodilačka vojska) started stationing planes there in October 1944 for operations on the Srem front, and later on in the final operations to liberate Yugoslavia. Since the mid-1950s, Jugovićevo lost its military significance. Today there is a military unit (Majevica barracks) stationed there. Since 1951 the main military airport has been near Batajnica for strategic reasons.

=== Second Novi Sad Airfield ===
The second airfield was opened on 14 June 1953 near the village of Čenej, 16 kilometers from the first airport. It was used as an aviation center for Vojvodina.

Čenej was chosen by the commander of the aviation center Sredoje Pajić due to its location, being on the road connecting Novi Sad with Subotica. The airfield has a grassy runway, mostly used for helicopters, air sports and smaller planes to take off from.

The idea of building an international airport on this site is not new, with construction of a control tower began in 1994. A 2,500 meters asphalt runway capable of accommodating 70 to 80 seater aircraft is planned. The air corridor above Novi Sad has about 800 movements per day, of which 50 are so-called 'mini-business' flights.

The site also has favourable prevailing winds. Meteorological data for the last 20 years shows the fewest fog affected days in the area per year.

On May 22, 2004, a Let L-410UVP-E Turbolet aircraft with 20 passengers aboard, which had departed from Tivat Airport, landed at the airfield. The aircraft belonged to Di Air, a Montenegrin airline. It was a promotional flight aimed at showing interest in developing this airfield in the future.

On August 14, 2019 the first international flight landed at Novi Sad Airfield. A German businessman who has a factory in Vojvodina flew in on a Cessna 340, and the aero club which operates the airfield, did the groundwork for the first international flight.

=== Aero Club Novi Sad ===
Aero Club Novi Sad was established on 11 November 1923, as a branch of the Royal Aero Club. Originally located at Jugovićevo Airport, since 14 June 1953 it has been operating at Čenej Airfield. In its over 100 years of its existence the aero club has had hundreds of members who have performed more than 50,000 parachute jumps, more than 120,000 flights, and flown for 40,000 hours. Pilots, gliders, parachutists and aircraft mechanics are trained in this club.

The club has organized numerous national and international competitions and events in the field of aviation. Many members of the club were members of national teams, with two world records that were achieved by members (number of jumps in one day and group high jumps) unbroken to this day.

== Development ==
=== Airport plans ===
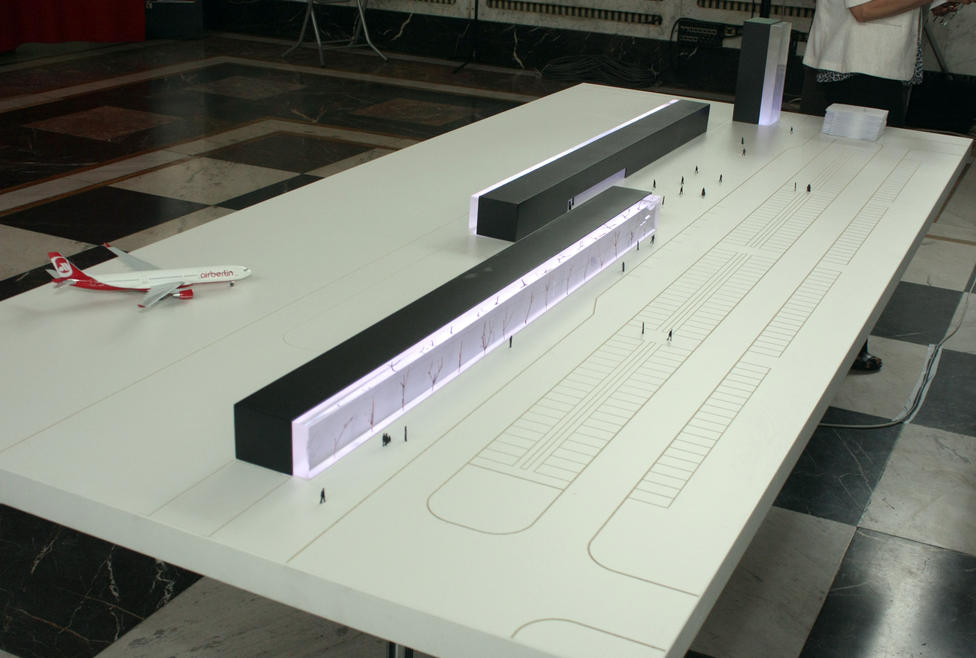
Model of a proposed airport, 2012

On April 5, 2012 the government of Vojvodina made a decision to develop the aerodrome for civilian traffic. It was planned that the Čenej Airport finish construction of its terminal building by the end of 2015, in order to service passenger, business, low cost and cargo flights.

Provincial authorities originally planned to the open the airport to passengers in 2015, and upon completion, to use public–private partnerships to provide additional funding. According to these plans, the airport would've looked similar to Tivat Airport in Montenegro.

A model of the airport was presented by the Faculty of Technical Sciences from the University of Novi Sad. The airport was designed as a type C airport with a departures and arrivals terminal, business facilities and control tower, and will occupy an area of about 7 hectares not including the runway and internal roads.

The total investment in the airport was planned to be 20 million euros. It was to retain a grass runway for sports aviation and to build a 30 meter wide, 1,760-meter long concrete runway for commercial flights. The airport would then qualify to bear the 3-C rating, which will be able to accommodate planes with wingspans from 24 to 36 meters and a maximum capacity of about 100 passengers.

As of 2024, conflicting plans for the future of Novi Sad's air transport are in place, with higher-level ones calling for the airport to be built in an entirely new location near Šajkaš and lower-level ones still concerned with reconstruction of the existing airfield. The Ministry of Transport has stated the final location of a future Novi Sad airport will be decided on at a later date.

== Gallery ==
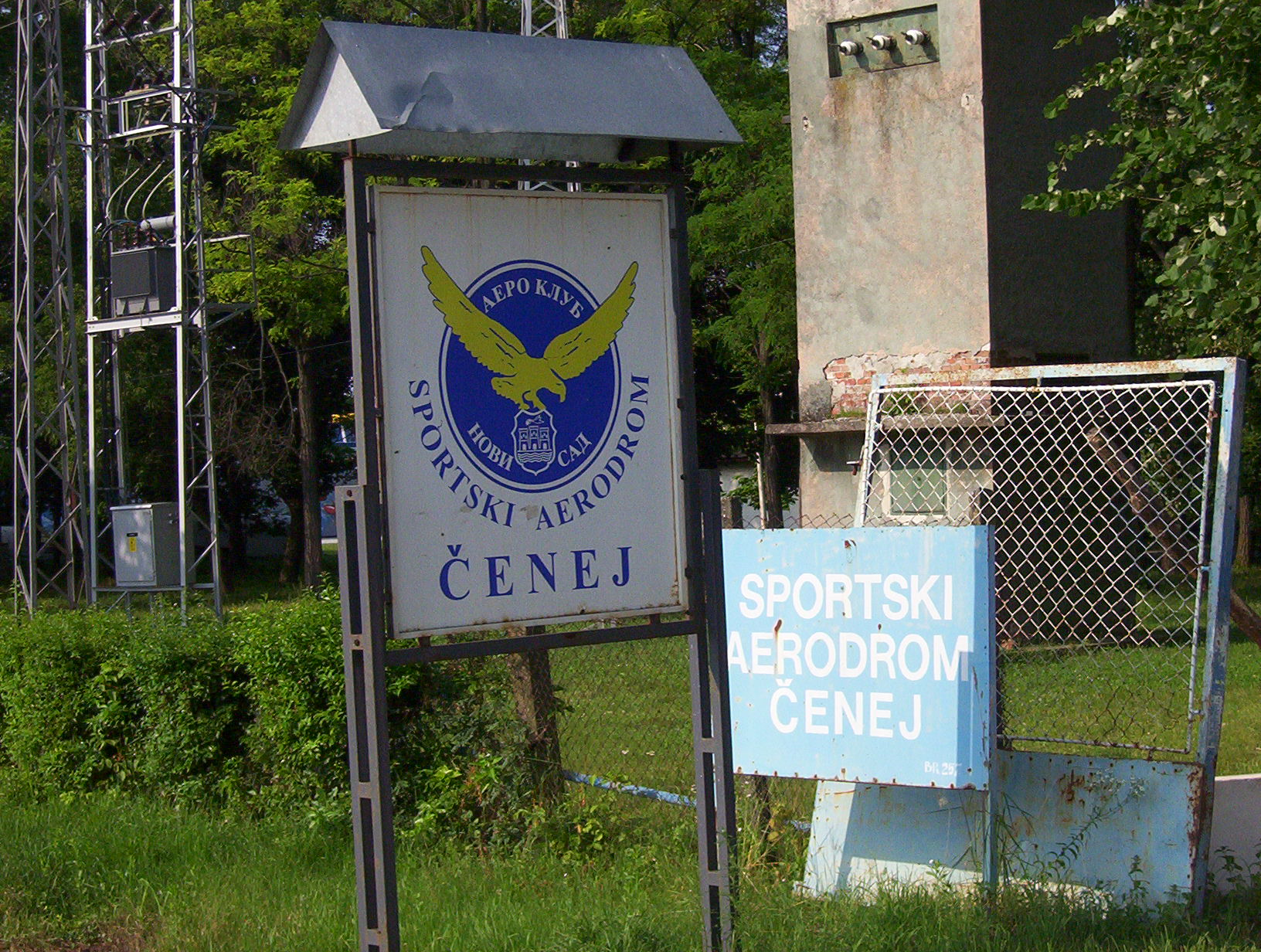
Old airfield entrance sign, 2006

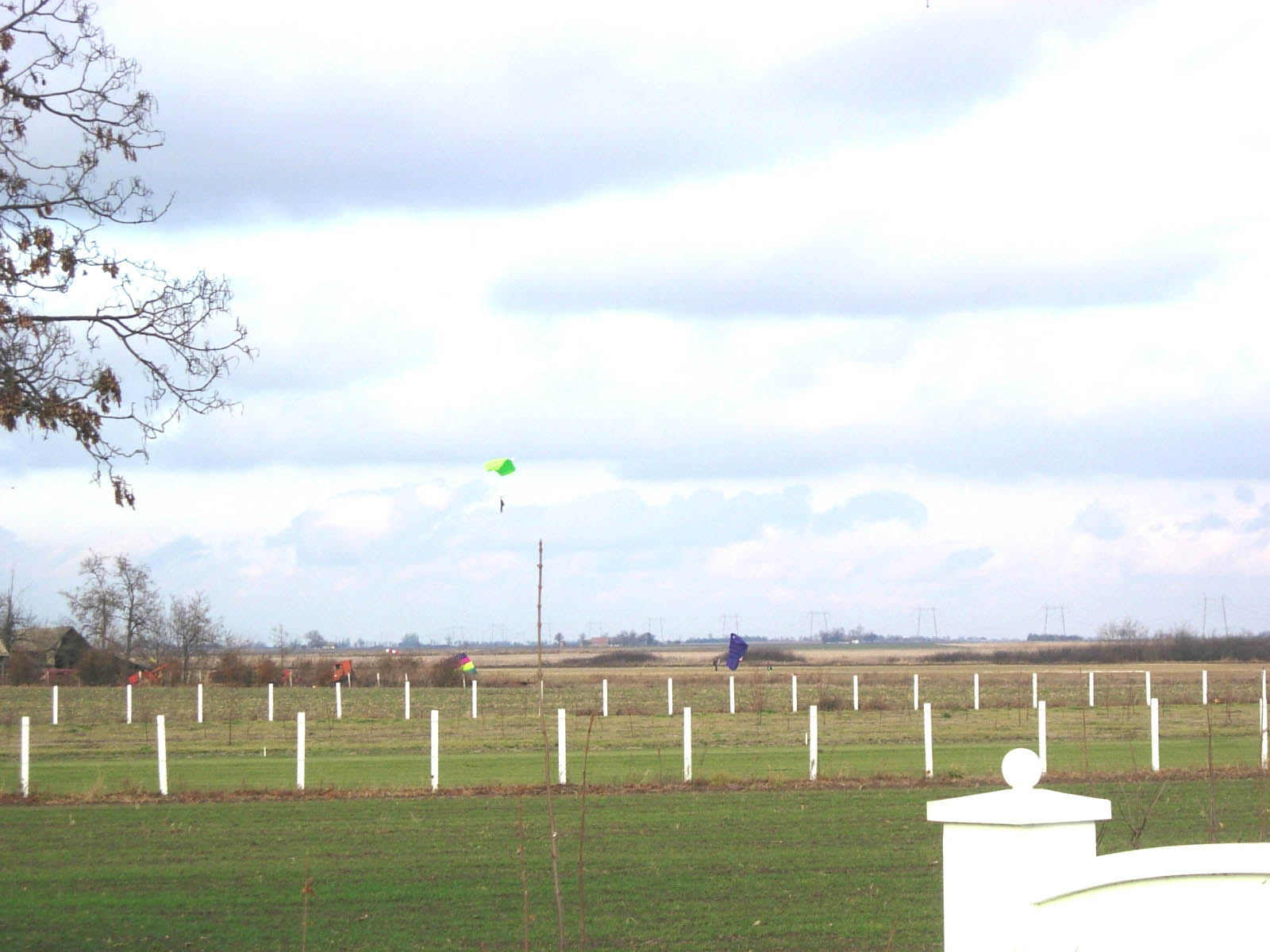
Airfield grass runway, 2006

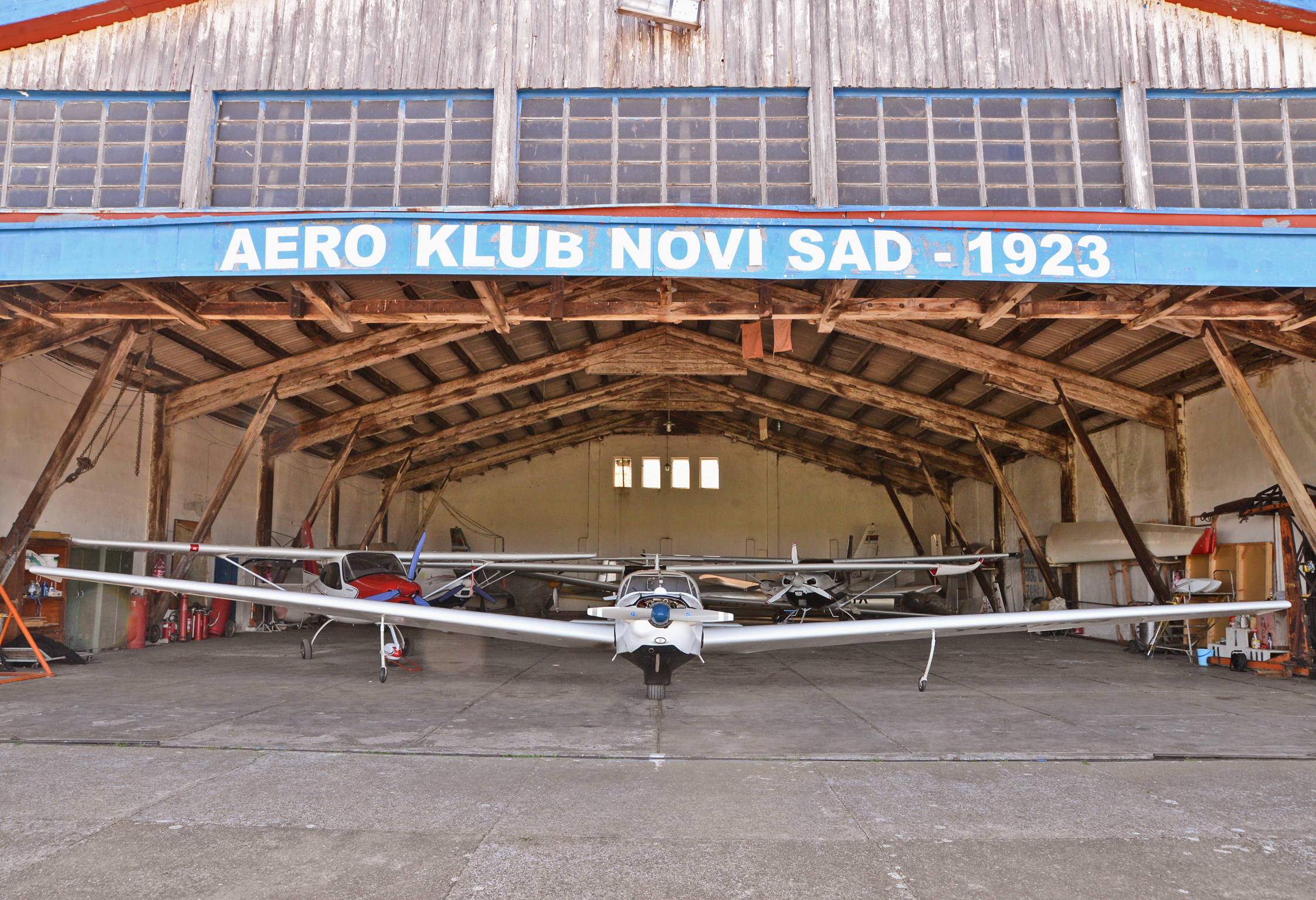
Airfield hangar, 2024

== See also ==
- List of airports in Serbia
