= Danica Tomić =

Pilot

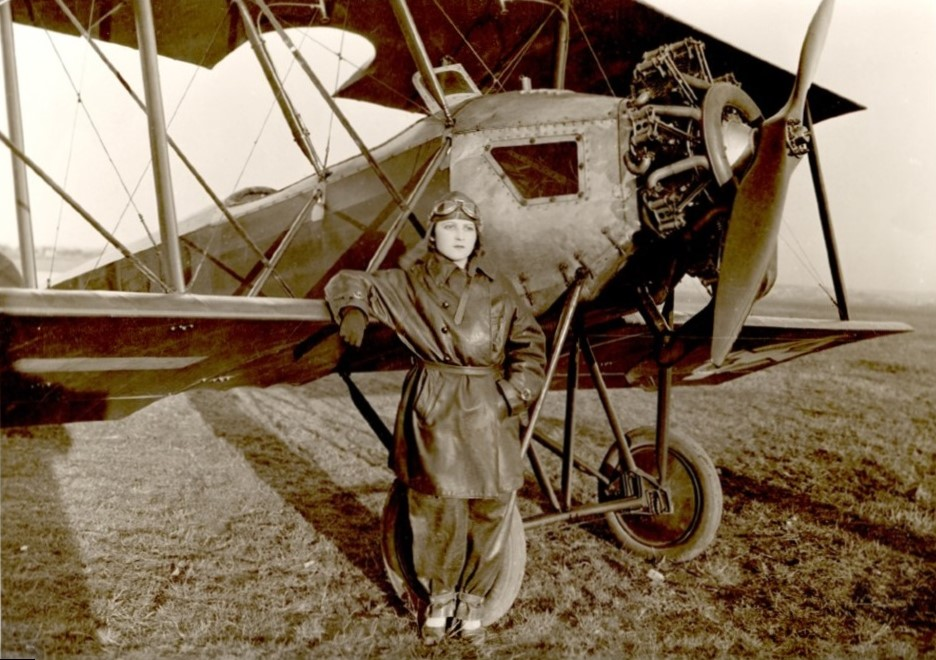
Tomić standing in front of an Arno HD-320, 1928

Danica Tomić (Serbian Cyrillic: Даница Томић; 25 July 1905 – 16 December 1961) was the first woman pilot in Yugoslavia and modern-day Serbia and the first woman with the pilot certification.

Danica Tomić was married to pilot Miodrag Tomić, which gave her access to books and materials related to aviation. In 1928, on the occasion of celebration of 15th anniversary of Belgrade Nikola Tesla Airport, Tomić performed aerobatic maneuvers as a first woman in Yugoslavia to do so. In 1930 she applied for the call published in Politika newspaper for course for reserve pilots at the Civil School for Pilots in Belgrade. In 1933 Danica received certification for a touristic pilot. For this achievement she received congratulations from the magazine Naša krila (transl. Our Wings).

There is a scarcity of public records on her life after 1933. Her husband was captured by the Germans and detained as a prisoner of war. He survived and left Yugoslavia following the war and settled in the United States together with Danica.
