= Voljavča Monastery =

Monastery in Serbia

Coordinates: 44°07′32″N 20°38′03″E

- Манастир Вољавча
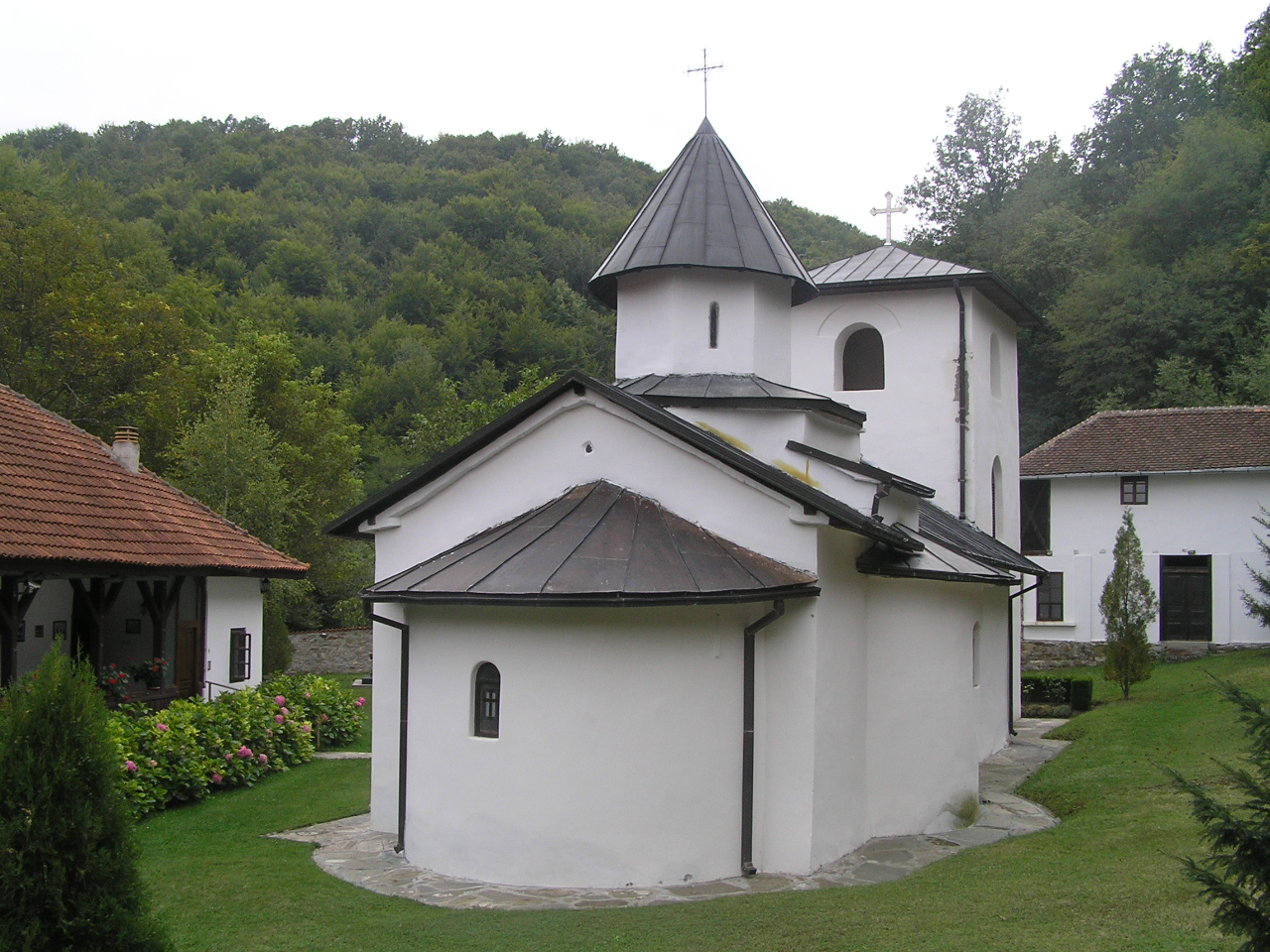
- Interactive map of Voljavča Monastery

Monastery information
- Denomination: Serbian Orthodox Church
- Diocese: Eparchy of Šumadija

Site
- Location: Stragari, Kragujevac, Serbia
- Website: www.voljavca.rs

The Voljavča Monastery (Serbian Cyrillic: Манастир Вољавча) is a Serbian Orthodox monastery located on the northeastern slopes of Mount Rudnik, near the village of Stragari in central Serbia.

The monastery church, dedicated to saints Michael and Gabriel, was an endowment of Mihailo Končinović, a nobleman of Despot Stefan Lazarević (r. 1402–27), reconstructed at the beginning of the 15th century on the ruins of an older church dating to 1050.

== History ==
The monastery is of great historical importance due to its role during the First Serbian Uprising, when the uprising leader, Karađorđe often hid there. In the residential part of the monastery, built in 1765. was held the first meeting of the Serbian Minister Council (Serbian Cyrillic: Правитељствујушчи совјет сербски), first executive governing organ of the modern Serbia.

== See also ==
- List of Serbian Orthodox monasteries
