= Military history of Serbia =

The military history of Serbia spans over 1200 years on the Balkan peninsula during the various forms of the Serbian state and Serbian military.

== Historical preview ==
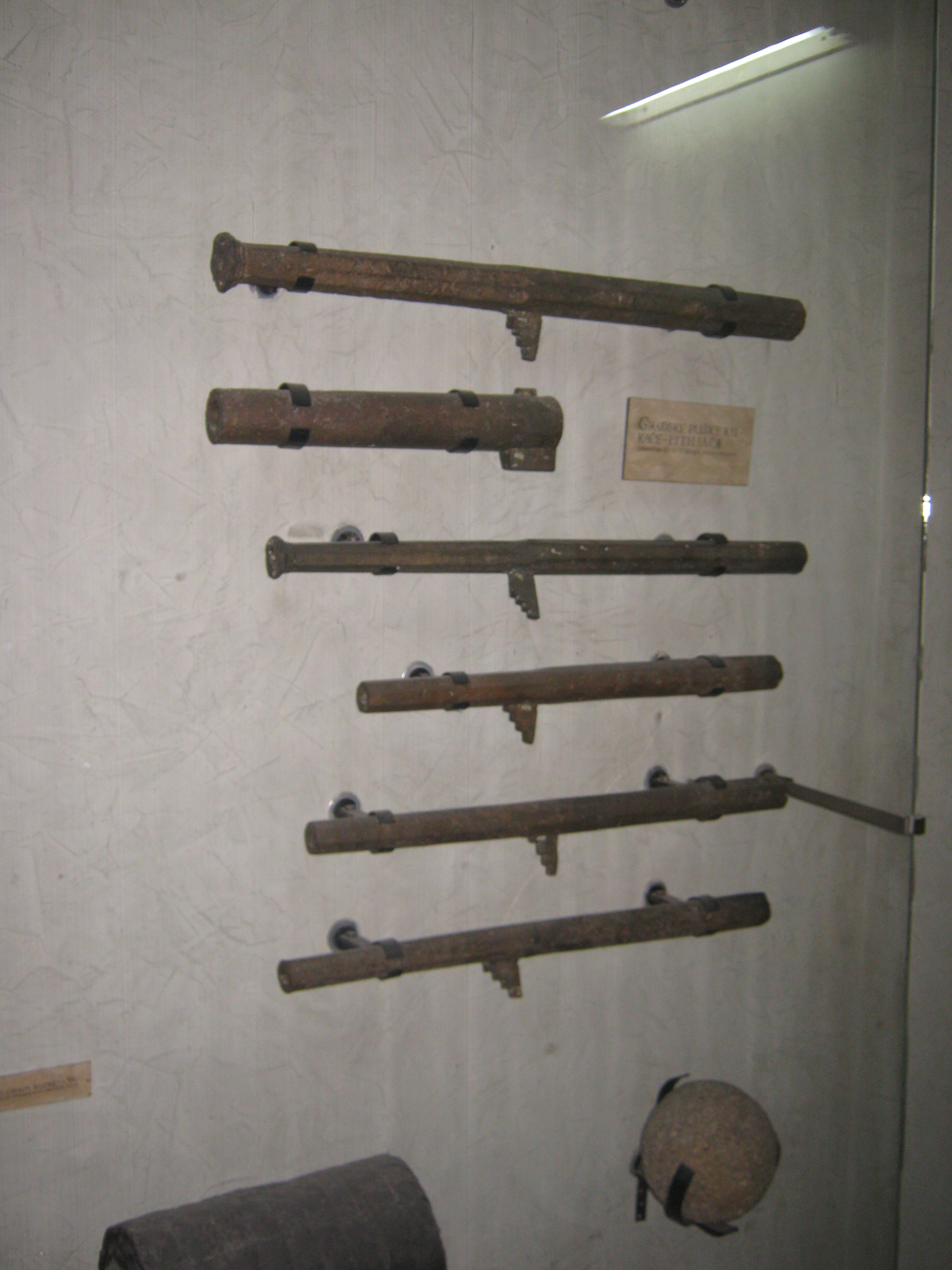
Musket fitiljača (named after the slow match used to ignite the gunpowder) used by the Serbian Army in the 15th century

=== Middle Ages ===
The Serbian army in the Middle Ages primarily consisted of light cavalry and infantry force armed with spears, javelins or bows. With the increasing wealth from mining, mercenary knights were recruited to complement noble cavalry armed with bow and lance. This enabled the Serbs to fight effectively outside their mountain strongholds. The core of the army consisted of noble cavalry (vlastela) armed with lance and bow in the Byzantine style in early medieval times. These were increasingly supplemented by western-style knights, mostly Germans (in Emperor Dušan reign).

Emperor Dušan's military tactics consisted of wedge-shaped heavy cavalry attacks with horse archers on the flanks. Many foreign mercenaries were in the Serbian army, mostly Germans as cavalry and Spaniards as infantry. Serbian army that defeated the Bulgarians at Battle of Velbazhd in 1330 were composed of 15,000 Serbs, 2,000 Italians from the Kingdom of Naples and 1,000 German mercenaries, Dušan also had personal mercenary guards, mainly German knights. A knight named Palman was the commander of this unit and was the leader of all German mercenaries. Light horses were provided by Hungarian and Cuman mercenaries. Later in the period, Serbian lance armed Hussars took over this role. The infantry still included lightly armed javelin troops although the bow and crossbow became the most important infantry weapon in the 14th century. A western-style charge by the armoured cavalry and knights was the main tactic that the infantry used to follow up. Ragusan historian Mavro Orbin recorded that Prince Lazar used cannons as early as 1373 in his war against Nikola Altamanovich in northern Serbia. Despot Stefan has armed his knights with light firearms (musket "Fitiljača"), also with spears, swords, daggers, maces, bow and arrows, crossbows, shields, armours, halberd and cannons. He also introduced European-style knight tournaments.

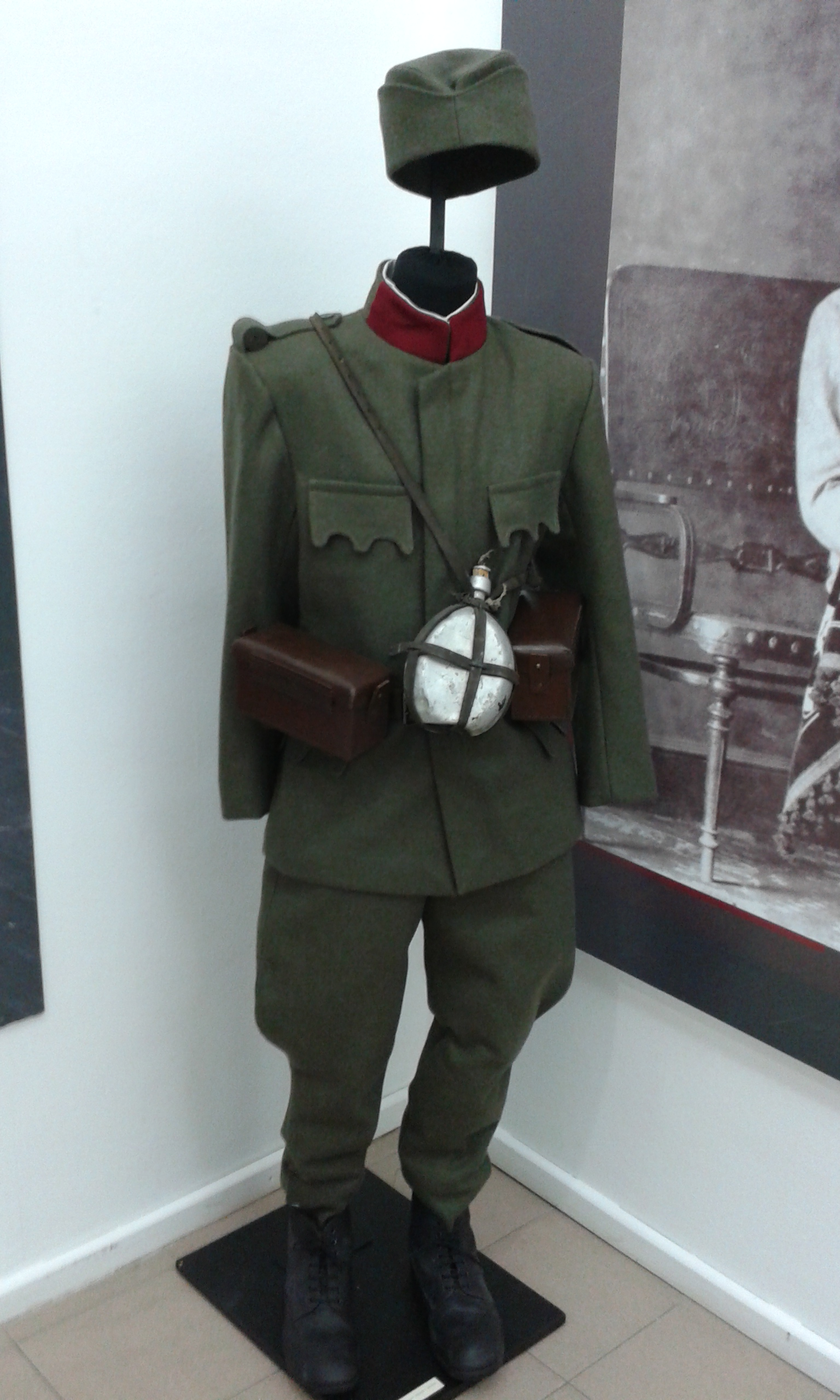
1914 Serbian military uniform

=== Modern Age and Contemporary period ===
The modern Serbian military dates back to the Serbian revolution which started in 1804 with the First Serbian Uprising against the Ottoman occupation of Serbia. The victories in the battles of Ivankovac (1805), Mišar (August 1806), Deligrad (December 1806) and Belgrade (November–December 1806), led to the establishment of the Principality of Serbia in 1817. The subsequent Second Serbian Uprising of 1815–1817 led to full independence and recognition of the Kingdom of Serbia and weakened the Ottoman dominance in the Balkans. In November 1885 the Serbo-Bulgarian War occurred following Bulgarian unification and resulted in a Bulgarian victory. In 1912 the First Balkan War (1912–1913) erupted between the Ottoman Empire and the Balkan League (Serbia, Greece, Montenegro and Bulgaria). Balkan League victories in the Battle of Kumanovo (October 1912), the Battle of Prilep (November 1912), the Battle of Monastir (November 1912), the Battle of Adrianople (November 1912 to March 1913), and the Siege of Scutari (October 1912 to April 1913) resulted in the defeat of the Ottoman Empire, which lost most of its remaining Balkan territories per the Treaty of London (May 1913). Shortly after, the Second Balkan War (June to August 1913) broke out when Bulgaria, dissatisfied with the division of territory, declared war against its former allies, Serbia and Greece. Following a string of defeats, Bulgaria requested an armistice and signed the 1913 Treaty of Bucharest, formally ending the war.

Serbia's independence and growing influence threatened neighboring Austria-Hungary which led to the Bosnian crisis of 1908–09. Consequently, from 1901, all Serbian males between the ages of 21 and 46 became liable for general mobilization. Following the assassination of Archduke Franz Ferdinand of Austria in June 1914, Austria-Hungary implicated Serbians and declared war on Serbia (July 1914), which marked the beginning of the First World War of 1914–1918. Serbian forces repelled three consecutive invasions by Austria in 1914, securing the first major victories of the war for the Allies, but were eventually overwhelmed by the combined forces of the Central Powers (October–November 1915) and forced to retreat through Albania (1915–1916) to the Greek island of Corfu (1915–1916).

Serbian military activity after World War I took place in the context of various Yugoslav armies until the break-up of Yugoslavia in the 1990s and the restoration of Serbia as an independent country in 2006.

== See also ==
- List of wars involving Serbia
- List of wars involving Serbia in the Middle Ages

== Sources ==
- Momir Jović, Kosta Radić. Srpske zemlje i vladari (1955), str. 68 – 80.
- Pavle Vasić, Uniforme srpske vojske 1808–1918, Prosveta, Beograd, 1980.
- Ćorović, Vladimir (1921). Istorija Srba [History of the Serbs] (in Serbian). pp. 201–215. ISBN 978-86-13-00641-1.
- Znamenite bitke i bojevi srpske i crnogorske vojske: Srpska vojska u velikim bitkama na Ceru, Drini i Kolubari. Pravoslavna reč. 1998. ISBN 978-86-335-0038-8.
- Branko Pavićević; Petar Opačić; Borislav Ratković; Mitar Rurišić (1998). Znamenite bitke i bojevi srpske i crnogorske vojske: od Careva Laza 1712. do Dobropoljske Bitke 1918. Pravoslavna reč. ISBN 978-86-335-0038-8.
- Petar Tomac (1959). Vojna istorija. Vojnoizdavački zavod JNA "Vojno delo,".
