= Jovan Jugović =

Captain Jovan Jugović
- Јован Југовић
- Born: 28 December [O.S. 16 December] 1886; Belgrade Kingdom of Serbia
- Died: 24 September 1926 (aged 39); Prague, Czechoslovakia
- Military career
- Allegiance: Kingdom of Serbia; Kingdom of Serbs, Croats and Slovenes
- Branch: Serbian Army, Serbian Air Force, Royal Yugoslav Air Force
- Service years: 1905–1926
- Rank: Captain
- Conflicts: Second Balkan War; World War I

Jovan A. Jugović (Serbian Cyrillic: Јован А. Југовић; 28 December [O.S. 16 December] 1886 – 24 September 1926) was an early Serbian aviator and fighter pilot.

== Biography ==
Jovan A. Jugović was born in Belgrade on 28 December [O.S. 16 December] 1886. He graduated from Belgrade's Military Academy in 1907, and entered the Serbian Army. On 1 May 1912, he left Belgrade and was sent to France to attend Farman's flight school with other Serbian recruits. Jugović graduated from the school in the summer of 1912, and received diploma #1013; he returned to Serbia that September. Upon returning to Serbia, Jugović was placed in charge of the Serbian Army's balloon squadron. He carried out several reconnaissance missions in Macedonia in July 1913, during the Second Balkan War. Jugović remained in charge of the balloon squadron until 1 March 1916, when he was transferred to the newly formed Serbian Air Force. Over the next two years, he flew combat missions over Bulgarian-occupied Macedonia in a French-made biplane. By the end of World War I, he had recorded three kills and earned the rank of captain. After the war, he held several senior positions in the newly formed Royal Yugoslav Air Force.

In September 1926, Jugović accompanied a Yugoslav delegation on a good-will mission to Czechoslovakia. Several weeks later, he began preparing for an air show above Prague. He was killed on 24 September, when his airplane collided with that of a Czechoslovak Air Force captain. Jugović's remains were buried in Belgrade.

== Legacy ==
Subsequently after his death the then unnamed airport in Novi Sad was named Jugovićevo. The airport would remain operational until the end of World War II when the military airport was moved to Batajnica Air Base in 1951 and the city airport to Čenej Airfield in 1953. The location of the old airport would be the site of the future Jugovićevo neighborhood.
