= Yugoslav Army =

Yugoslav Army, Army of Yugoslavia, or Military of Yugoslavia may refer to:

- Royal Yugoslav Army (1918–1941), the army of the Kingdom of Yugoslavia
- Yugoslav National Liberation Army (1941–1945), the Yugoslav communist-led resistance movement during World War II best known as the Partisans
- Yugoslav People's Army (1945–1992), the army of the Socialist Federal Republic of Yugoslavia
- Yugoslav Army (Federal Republic of Yugoslavia) (1992–2003), the name of the armed forces of Serbia and Montenegro between 1992 and 2003
- Yugoslav Army (basketball team), a men's basketball team in Belgrade, Yugoslavia from 1944 to 1946

== See also ==
- Yugoslav Air Force
- Yugoslav Navy
