= Stragari =

Stragari Страгари (Serbian)
- Rural settlement
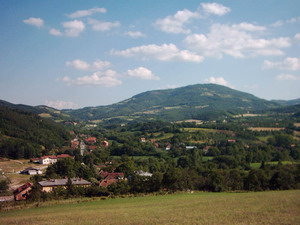
- Stragari

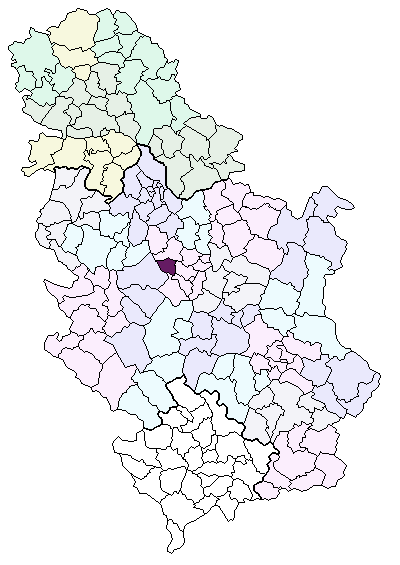
- Location of the municipality of Stragari within Serbia
- Coordinates: 44°09′N 20°40′E
- Country: Serbia
- Region: Šumadija and Western Serbia
- District: Šumadija
- Municipality: Kragujevac

Area
  - Stragari: 165 km^{2} (64 sq mi)

Population (2011 census)
  - Stragari: 827
- Time zone: UTC+1 (CET)
  - Summer (DST): UTC+2 (CEST)
- Postal code: 34323
- Area code: +381(0)34
- Car plates: KG
- Website: www.stragari.co.rs

Stragari (Serbian Cyrillic: Страгари) is a rural settlement within the City of Kragujevac.

== Geography ==
It is located at 250m above sea level, 30km northwest of Kragujevac and about 120km south of state capital, Belgrade. Stragari lies at the confluence of the Srebrnica River into Jasenica River, on the northeastern side of the Rudnik Mountain (highest peak - Cvijić's peak, 1,132m).

Stragari is the place of one of the biggest asbestos mines in Europe.

== History ==
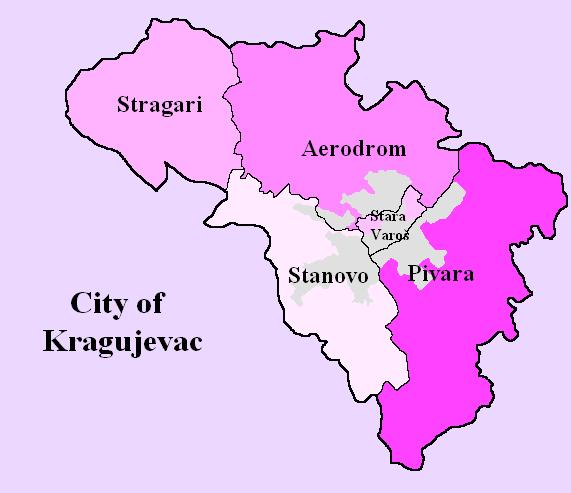
Map of the city municipalities which constituted the city of Kragujevac

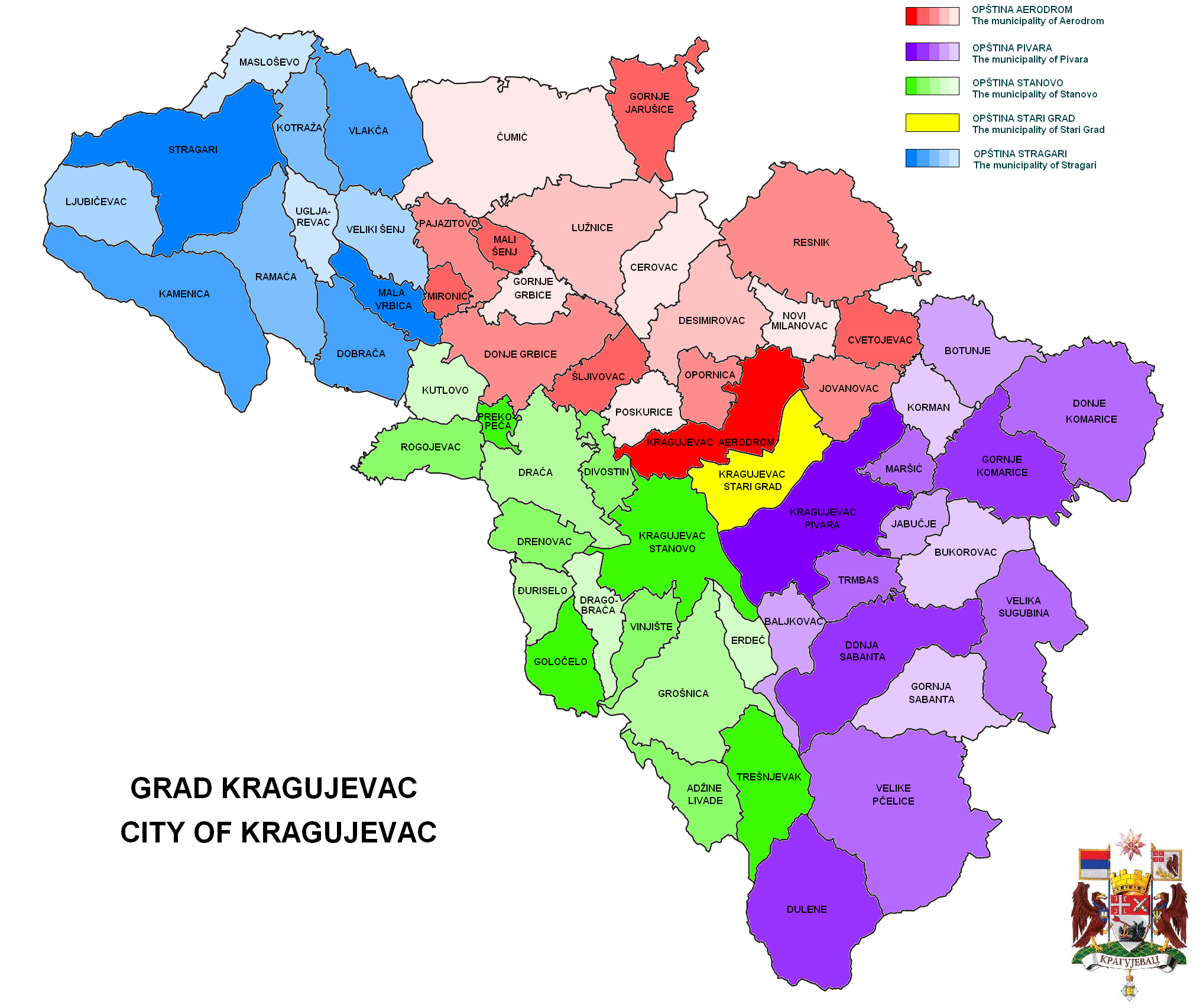
Map of the city municipalities with settlements

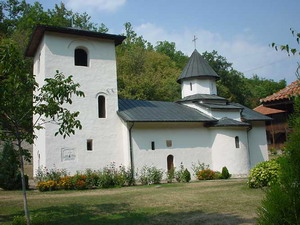
The 14th century monastery Voljavča near Stragari

In 1425 Stefan Lazarević held a major meeting at Srebrnica noble residence in Stragari area, because of the question on who would succeed him to the Serb throne (he had no children), and he chose Đurađ Branković. Stragari was mentioned for the first time in Turkish census documentation in 1476 as Strgar. At that time, Stragari had only 39 households. From 1717 to 1739 the town saw a large influx of Austrians.

The village was active in the Serbian Revolution, being organized into the knežina (administrative unit) of Kačer during the First Serbian Uprising (1804–13). Among revolutionaries from the village were Janićije Đurić-Dimitrijević (1779–1850), Karađorđe's secretary; Atanasije Rajić (1765–1815), Karađorđe's barjaktar (flag-bearer) and tobdžija (cannoneer); soldiers Stevan Rajaković, Mate Milivojević, Mandić, Nikodije Đurić, Milovan Đurić, Proko Milovanović; priest Petar Matić.

The Voljavča monastery in Stragari played a notable role in the uprising. Karađorđe and his supporters often hid there, especially before the outbreak of the uprising. In 1805, the Serbian Governing Council held their first sessions in Voljavča, when the monastery was adapted and expanded for the needs of the Council. Voljavča was additionally upgraded and renovated in the late 1830s by Janićije Đurić.

Stragari received the status of town in 1922.

From May 2002, Stragari (along with 10 other settlements), formed one of five city municipalities which consisted the City of Kragujevac. However, the city municipality of Stragari was dissolved in March 2008.

== Economy ==
This is an agricultural area and farmers produce fruit, vegetables, and breeding cattle. The main industrial plant is Stragarit (paper industry).

Stragari has the preconditions necessary for development of a tourism industry. The spa "Voljavča" and the monastery with the same name are located in the area, as well as good facilities for recreation activities and hunting.

== Gallery ==
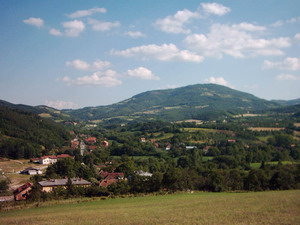
Part of Stragari with Ramaćki peak (813 m) behind

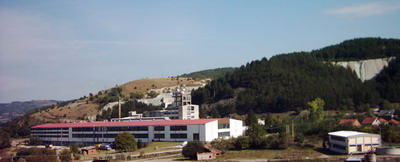
Stragarit

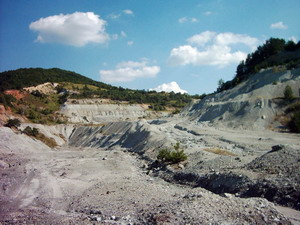
Asbestos

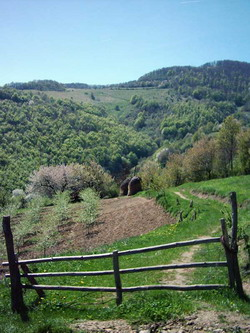
Ljubićevac on Rudnik Mt, near Stragari
