= Jasenica (river) =

Jasenica (Јасеница)
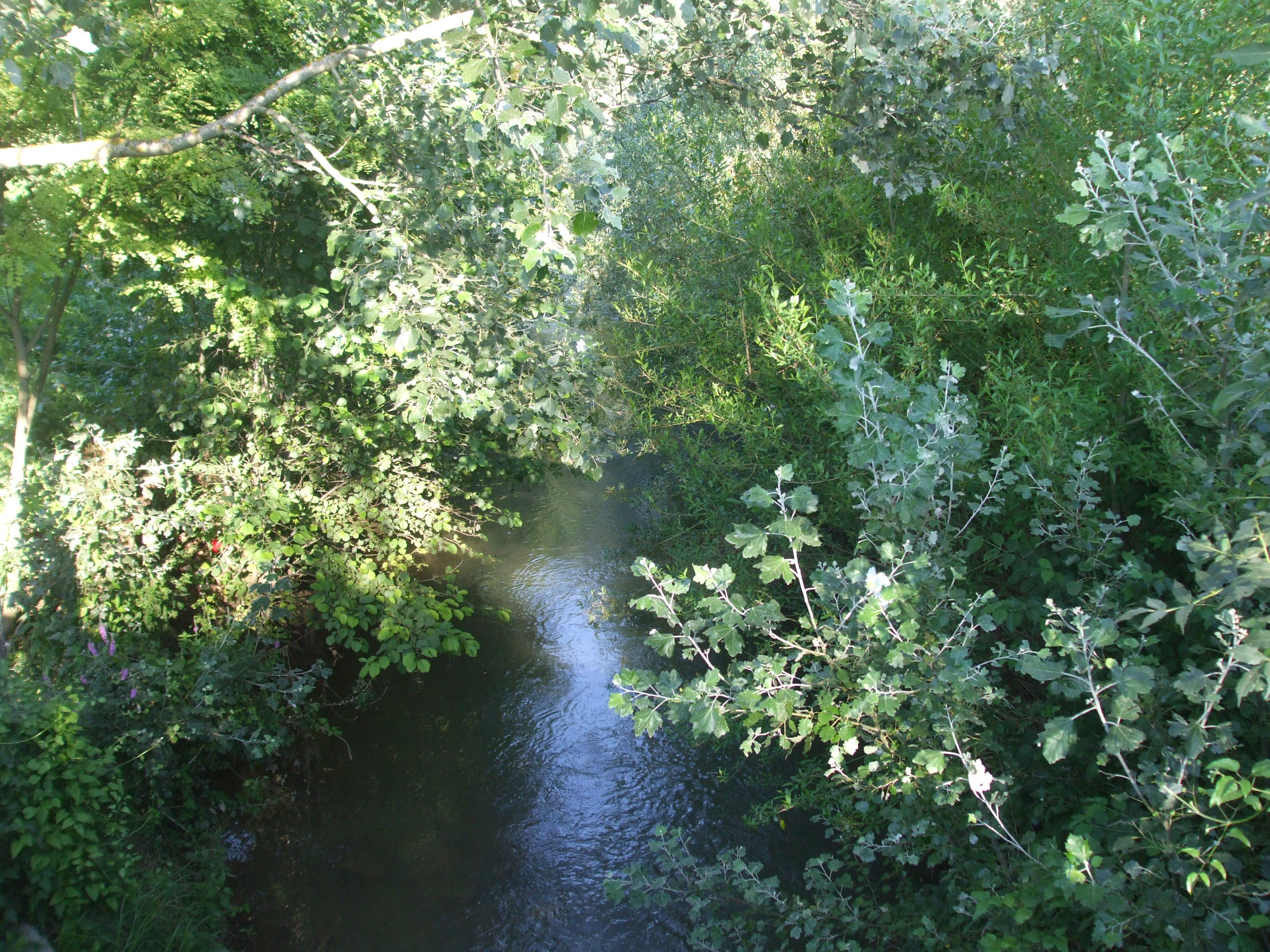

Location
- Country: Serbia

Physical characteristics
- Source
  - location: Rudnik mountain
- Mouth
  - location: Great Morava
  - coordinates: 44°22′42″N 21°06′08″E
- Length: 79 km (49 mi)
- Basin size: 1,388 km^{2} (536 sq mi)

Basin features
- Progression: Great Morava→ Danube→ Black Sea

The Jasenica (Serbian Cyrillic: Јасеница, pronounced [jasɛ̌nitsa]) is a river in central Serbia. It is 79 kilometres (49 mi) long and is the left tributary of the Great Morava. This river gives the name to the surrounding region.

== Description ==
The Jasenica originates from several streams, most notably the Đurinci (Cyrillic: Ђуринци) from Venčac mountain, and the Srebrenica (Cyrillic: Сребреница) from the northern slopes of the Rudnik mountain in central Serbia. At its origin, the river runs through the eastern border of the Kačer region. It flows southeast initially, curves around the Rudnik, passes the villages of Donja Šatornja, Blaznava and reaches Stragari, the northernmost municipality of the City of Kragujevac. The area is known as the geographical center of Serbia (near the village of Čumić).

The Jasenica turns north, then northeast south of Topola and, after the villages of Božurnja and Žabare, directly east. Near the village of Natalinci the Trnava (Cyrillic: Трнава) runs into it from the right and changes its direction once more, this time to the northeast. After Mramorac village, the Jasenica spills over in several parallel flows, which continue until its confluence.

After the Pridvorica and Vodice villages (on different arms of the river), the Jasenica reaches the town of Smederevska Palanka, the most populous settlement in its valley. This is also where the Kubršnica, its main tributary, flows into it from the left. The Jasenica then gently bends to the east, flowing into the Great Morava near the village of Veliko Orašje (the southern arm of the river flows through the town of Velika Plana).

The Jasenica's drainage area covers 1,388 square kilometres (536 sq mi) (part of the Black Sea drainage basin). The river is not navigable. Its name means the Ash tree river in Serbian.

== Region ==
The Jasenica region extends beyond the Jasenica river valley, encompassing the region bounded by the Rudnik, Venčac and Kosmaj mountains, and the valley of the Velika Morava. It divides in two sub-regions, lower Jasenica of Smederevska Palanka, and upper Jasenica of Kragujevac. It covers the valleys of the Jasenica, Kubršnica, Veliki Lug, Brestovica, Milatovica and other rivers. The Jablanica river itself delineates the eastern border of the region for the most part, dividing it from the Lepenica region. The region is densely populated, including several towns (Smederevska Palanka, Velika Plana, Aranđelovac, Mladenovac and Topola.)

== See also ==
- List of rivers of Serbia
- Jasenička
