= List of rivers of Serbia =

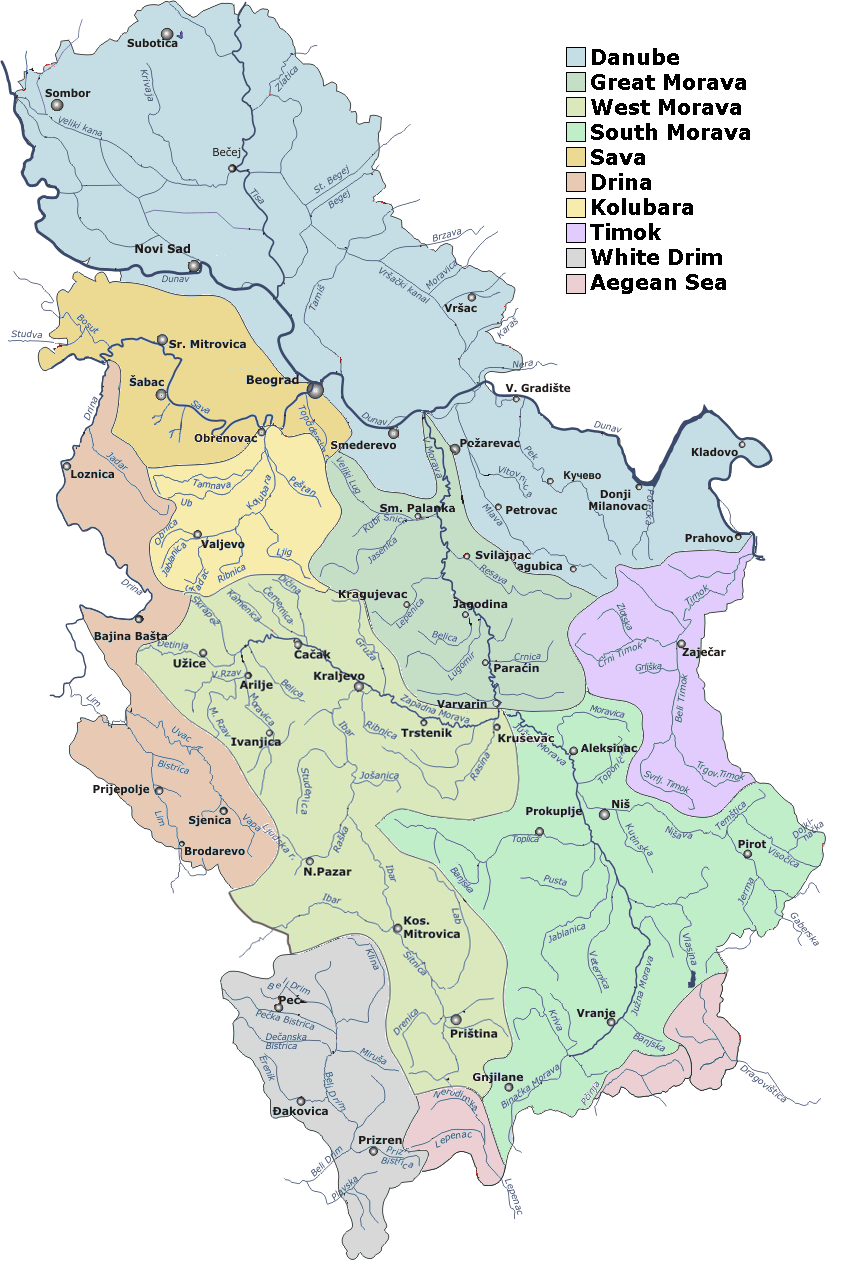
Rivers and main drainage basins in Serbia.

Many rivers flow entirely or partially within Serbia proper, and others are just border rivers. They are dammed for the purpose of generating hydroelectric power or as water reservoirs, creating most of the lakes of Serbia.

== Drainage basins ==
All rivers in Serbia belong to the drainage basins of three seas: Black Sea, Adriatic Sea or Aegean Sea.

The largest in area, Black Sea drainage basin, covers an area of 81,261 km^{2} or 92% of the territory of Serbia. The entire basin is drained by only one river, the Danube, which flows into the Black Sea. All major rivers in Serbia, like Tisa, Sava, Velika Morava and Drina belong to it.

The Adriatic Sea drainage basin covers an area of 4,500 km^{2} or 5% of territory of Serbia. It comprises the western half of the Kosovo and Metohija and it is mostly drained by one river, the White Drin, which in Albania meets the Black Drin to create the Drin river, which flows into the Adriatic Sea. Smaller portion of it is drained by Crni Kamen-Radika river in the extreme southern region of Gora, which also drains into Black Drin in North Macedonia.

The Aegean Sea basin is the smallest in area, 2,650 km^{2} or 3% of the territory of Serbia, and covers the southern parts of Serbia, to the Macedonian and Bulgarian borders. It is drained by three rivers: Lepenac, Pčinja and Dragovištica. The first two flow into the Vardar river in North Macedonia, and the third flows into the Struma river in Bulgaria, and both of those rivers flow into the Aegean Sea.

All three basins meet at the Drmanska glava peak on the Crnoljeva mountain in central Kosovo, which represents the water divide of Serbia and the major one in the Balkans, as it divides three out of the Balkan's four drainage basins (the fourth being the Ionian Sea).

== List of major rivers ==
The lengths in the table present the overall lengths of the rivers, not just the Serbian parts of the flow. In the first table, rivers over 50 km are listed, including river systems (such as Great Morava) created by confluence of other major rivers; in those cases, the length is given as the total of the river and the longer headstream.

Selected list of shorter rivers is added below the two tables.

	Name	Cyrillic	Length (km)	Drainage area (km^{2})	Drainage basin (sea)	length measured as:	Main tributary (in Serbia)	Provinces within Serbia	Countries sharing the same river
1.	Danube	Дунав	2888	817000	Black	Breg-Danube	Tisa	Vojvodina, Central Serbia	Germany, Austria, Slovakia, Hungary, Croatia, Romania, Bulgaria, Ukraine
2.	Tisa	Тиса	1026	157020	Black	Black Tisa-Tisa	Begej	Vojvodina	Ukraine, Romania, Hungary
3.	Sava	Сава	990	95719	Black	Sava Dolinka-Sava	Drina	Vojvodina, Central Serbia	Slovenia, Croatia, Bosnia and Herzegovina
4.	Velika Morava (Great Morava)	Велика Морава	493	35419	Black	Golijska Moravica-Zapadna Morava-Velika Morava	Južna Morava	Central Serbia	none
5.	Drina	Дрина	487	19570	Black	Tara-Drina	Lim	Central Serbia	Montenegro, Bosnia and Herzegovina
6.	Tamiš	Тамиш	359	13085	Black	regular	Brzava	Vojvodina	Romania
7.	Drin	Дрим	335	11756	Adriatic	White Drin-Drin	Klina	Kosovo	Albania
8.	Južna Morava (South Morava)	Јужна Морава	295	15469	Black	Golema-Binačka Morava-Južna Morava	Nišava	Kosovo, Central Serbia	North Macedonia
9.	Ibar	Ибар	276	8059	Black	regular	Sitnica	Central Serbia, Kosovo	Montenegro
10.	Begej	Бегеј	254	2878	Black	regular	Novi Begej	Vojvodina	Romania
11.	Lim	Лим	220	5963	Black	Vrmoša-Luča-Lake Plav-Lim	Uvac	Central Serbia	Montenegro, Albania, Bosnia and Herzegovina
12.	Nišava	Нишава	218	3950	Black	regular	Temštica	Central Serbia	Bulgaria
13.	Timok	Тимок	203	4630	Black	Svrljiški Timok-Beli Timok-Timok	Crni Timok	Central Serbia	Bulgaria
14.	Bosut	Босут	186	3097	Black	Biđ-Bosut	Studva	Vojvodina	Croatia
15.	Brzava	Брзава	166	1190	Black	regular	minor flows	Vojvodina	Romania
16.	Toplica	Топлица	130	2600	Black	Duboka-Toplica	Kosanica	Central Serbia	none
17.	Pek	Пек	129	1236	Black	Lipa-Pek	Jagnjilo	Central Serbia	none
18.	Plazović	Плазовић	129		Black	regular	minor flows	Vojvodina	Hungary
19.	Pčinja	Пчиња	128	3140	Aegean	regular	minor flows	Central Serbia	North Macedonia
20.	Nera	Нера	124	1420	Black	regular	minor flows	Vojvodina	Romania
21.	Kolubara	Колубара	123	3639	Black	Obnica-Kolubara	Tamnava	Central Serbia	none
22.	Uvac	Увац	119	1095	Black	Rasanska reka-Vapa-Uvac	Tisnica	Central Serbia	Bosnia and Herzegovina
23.	Mlava	Млава	118	1210	Black	Tisnica-Mlava	Vitovnica	Central Serbia	None
24.	Karaš	Караш	110	1400	Black	regular	Ilidija	Vojvodina	Romania
25.	Krivaja (Bačka)	Криваја	109	956	Black	regular	minor flows	Vojvodina	none
26.	Čik	Чик	95	481	Black	regular	none	Vojvodina	none
27.	Rasina	Расина	92	994	Black	regular	minor flows	Central Serbia	none
28.	Sitnica	Ситница	90	3129	Black	regular	Lab	Kosovo	none
29.	Tamnava	Тамнава	90	930	Black	regular	Ub	Central Serbia	none
30.	Kereš	Кереш	90	976	Black	regular	none	Vojvodina	Hungary
31.	Temštica	Темштица	86	820	Black	Visočica-Temštica	Dojkinička reka	Central Serbia	Bulgaria
32.	Jablanica	Јабланица	85	895	Black	regular	Čokotinska reka	Central Serbia	none
33.	Crni Timok	Црни Тимок	84	1003	Black	regular	Zlotska reka	Central Serbia	none
34.	Nadela	Надела	84		Black	regular	minor flows	Vojvodina	none
35.	Jasenica	Јасеница	79	1343	Black	regular	Kubršnica	Central Serbia	none
36.	Jadar	Јадар	79	894	Black	regular	Rakovica	Central Serbia	none
37.	Gruža	Гружа	77	622	Black	regular	Kotlenjača	Central Serbia	none
38.	Lepenac	Лепенац	75	770	Aegean	regular	Nerodimka	Kosovo	North Macedonia
39.	Đetinja	Ђетиња	75	1486	Black	regular	Skrapež	Central Serbia	none
40.	Veternica	Ветерница	75	515	Black	regular	Sušica	Central Serbia	none
41.	Jerma	Јерма	74		Black	regular	Zvonačka reka	Central Serbia	Bulgaria
42.	Lab	Лаб	72	950	Black	regular	Kačandolska reka	Kosovo	none
43.	Rzav (Drina)	Рзав	72	605	Black	Black Rzav-Rzav	White Rzav	Central Serbia	Bosnia and Herzegovina
44.	Pusta reka (Južna Morava)	Пуста река	71	569	Black	Golema-Pusta reka	minor flows	Central Serbia	none
45.	Mostonga	Мостонга	70		Black	regular	none	Vojvodina	none
46.	Radika	Радика	70	665	Adriatic	Crni Kamen-Ćafa Kadis-Radika	minor flows	Central Serbia	North Macedonia
47.	Galacka	Галацка	69	843	Black	regular	minor flows	Vojvodina	none
48.	Vlasina	Власина	68	1050	Black	regular	Lužnica	Central Serbia	none
49.	Resava	Ресава	65	685	Black	regular	none	Central Serbia	none
50.	Jegrička	Јегричка	65		Black	regular	none	Vojvodina	none
51.	Dragovištica	Драговиштица	63		Aegean	Mutnica-Božička reka-Dragovištica	Ljubatska reka	Central Serbia	Bulgaria
52.	Pećka Bistrica (Peć Bistrica)	Пећка Бистрица	62	505	Adriatic	regular	minor flows	Kosovo	Montenegro
53.	Klina	Клина	62	393	Adriatic	regular	Move	Kosovo	none
54.	Rzav (Golija)	Рзав	61	575	Black	Veliki Rzav-Rzav	Mali Rzav	Central Serbia	none
55.	Studenica	Студеница	60	582	Black	Crna reka-Studenica	Brusnička reka	Central Serbia	none
56.	Raška	Рашка	60	1193	Black	regular	Deževska reka	Central Serbia	none
57.	Sokobanjska Moravica	Сокобањска Моравица	58	606	Black	regular	minor flows	Central Serbia	none
58.	Ub	Уб	57	274	Black	regular	minor flows	Central Serbia	none
59.	Lugomir	Лугомир	57	447	Black	Dulenska reka-Lugomir	Županjevačka reka	Central Serbia	none
60.	Jerez	Јерез	56	503	Black	regular	minor flows	Central Serbia	none
61.	Jasenička reka	Јасеничка река	55		Black	Vrelska reka-Jasenička reka	minor flows	Central Serbia	none
62.	Dečanska Bistrica (Dečani Bistrica)	Дечанска Бистрица	53	300	Adriatic	Kožnjarska Bistrica-Dečanska Bistrica	Kožnjarska Bistrica	Kosovo	none
63.	Jarčina	Јарчина	53		Black	Međeš-Progarska Jarčina	minor flows	Vojvodina, Central Serbia	none
64.	Budovar	Будовар	52		Black	Patka-Budovar	minor flows	Vojvodina	none
65.	Drenica	Дреница	51	447	Black	regular	Vrbovačka reka	Kosovo	none
66.	Ralja	Раља	51	310	Black	regular	minor flows	Central Serbia	none
67.	Erenik	Ереник	51	516	Adriatic	regular	Loćanska Bistrica	Kosovo	none
68.	Porečka reka	Поречка река	50	538	Black	Šaška-Porečka	Crnajka	Central Serbia	none
69.	Trgoviški Timok	Трговишки Тимок	50	520	Black	Strma reka-Trgoviški Timok	Žukovska reka	Central Serbia	none

=== Major sub-rivers ===
Some rivers, historically with different names, are already included in the length of other rivers, but exist as separate rivers in topography or tradition. The most prominent ones are listed below.

	Name	Cyrillic	Length (km)	Drainage area (km^{2})	Drainage basin (sea)	length measured as:	Main tributary	Provinces within Serbia	Included in:
1.	Zapadna Morava (West Morava)	Западна Морава	308	15849	Black	Golijska Moravica-West Morava	Ibar	Central Serbia	Great Morava
2.	White Drin	Бели Дрим	175	4300	Adriatic	regular	Klina	Kosovo	Drin
3.	Beli Timok	Бели Тимок	115	2167	Black	Svrljiški Timok-White Timok	Trgoviški Timok	Central Serbia	Timok
4.	Golijska Moravica	Голијска Моравица	98	1486	Black	regular	Ðetinja	Central Serbia	West and Great Morava
5.	Visočica	Височица	71		Black	regular	Dojkinička reka	Central Serbia	Temštica
6.	Svrljiški Timok	Сврљишки Тимок	64	720	Black	regular	minor flows	Central Serbia	White Timok and Timok

== List of selected rivers below 50 km ==
- Binačka Morava (Binač Morava), 49 km
- Lepenica, 48 km
- Skrapež, 48 km
- Galovica, 47 km
- Kalenićka reka, 45 km
- Pepeljuša, 45
- Rača, 44 km
- Toponička reka, 43 km
- Čemernica, 43 km
- Kubršnica, 42 km
- Jezava, 47,5 km
- Nerodimka, 41 km
- Tegošnica, 41 km
- Zamna, 41 km
- Belica, 40 km
- Kutinska reka, 40 km
- Lužnica (Vlasina), 39 km
- Kosanica, 38 km
- Dobrava, 38 km
- Studva, 37 km
- Turija (Kolubara), 36 km
- Prizrenska Bistrica, 35 km
- Dičina, 35 km
- Kriva reka, 35 km
- Ljuboviđa, 34 km
- Zasavica, 34 km
- Kudoš, 34 km
- Kamenica (Zapadna Morava), 34 km
- Poblačnica-Ustibarska, 34 km
- Barbatovačka reka, 34 km
- Rupska-Kozarska reka, 34 km
- Peštan, 33 km
- Bela reka (Mačva), 33 km
- Resavčina, 32 km
- Kačer, 32 km
- Jovanovačka reka, 31 km
- Ljig, 31 km
- Bitva, 31 km
- Vizelj, 31 km
- Petrovačka reka, 31 km
- Topčiderska reka, 30 km
- Crnica, 30 km
- Miruša, 30 km
- Plavska reka, 30 km
- Likodra, 30 km
- Gračanica, 30 km
- Gradac, 30 km
- Konjska reka, 30 km
- Turija (Južna Morava), 30 km
- Zlotska reka, 30 km
- Gračanica, 30 km
- Trnovačka reka, 30 km
- Guzajna, 29 km
- Osanica, 29 km
- Vrla, 28 km
- Slatinska reka, 28 km
- Ribnica (Kolubara), 28 km
- Vrla, 28 km
- Velika-Slatinska reka, 28 km
- Lešnica, 28 km
- Veliki Begej, 27 km
- Resavica, 27 km
- Preševska Moravica, 27 km
- Rogačica, 27 km
- Vukodraž, 27 km
- Grza, 26 km
- Ravanica, 26 km
- Sibnica, 26 km
- Šelovrnac, 25 km
- Jošanica, 25 km
- Dojkinička reka, 25 km
- Lužnica (Skrapež), 25 km
- Čikas, 24 km
- Radovanska reka, 24 km
- Jablanica (Valjevo), 24 km
- Despotovica, 24 km
- Ribnica (Ibar), 23 km
- Crnajka, 22 km
- Deževka, 22 km
- Cernica, 22 km
- Vratna, 22 km
- Jelašnica (Južna Morava), 21 km
- Borovštica, 20 km
- Vranj, 20 km
- Mileševka, 20 km
- Bistrica-Boroštica, 20 km
- Sutjeska, 20 km
- Blatašnica, 18 km
- Vučjanka, 18 km
- Keveriš, 17 km
- Gradska reka, 17 km
- Krivaja (Syrmia), 16 km
- Ponjavica, 16 km
- Ostružnička reka, 15 km
- Ljukovo, 14 km
- Bolečica, 12 km
- Rakovički potok, 8,5 km
- Vrelo, 0,365 km
- Loćanska Bistrica (Loćane Bistrica) ? km
- Kožnjarska Bistrica (Kožnjar Bistrica) ? km
- Pusta reka (Vlasina) ? km
- Toplica (Kolubara) ? km

== See also ==
- List of mountains in Serbia
- List of lakes in Serbia
