= Vinča (disambiguation) =

Vinča is a suburb of Belgrade, Serbia.

Vinča may also refer to:

- Vinča-Belo Brdo, an archaeological site in the suburb
- Vinča culture, a culture named after the site
  - Vinča symbols, undeciphered symbols from the Vinča culture
- Vinča Nuclear Institute, near Belgrade
- Vinča (Topola), a village in the municipality Topola, Serbia

== See also ==
- Vinca (disambiguation)
