= Kubršnica =

- Native name: Кубршница (Serbian)

Location
- Country: Serbia

Physical characteristics
- Source
  - location: Venčac mountain, Šumadija, Serbia
- Mouth
  - location: Jasenica, near Smederevska Palanka, Serbia
  - coordinates: 44.3444°N 20.9727°E
- Length: 42 km (26 mi)
- Basin size: 709 km^{2} (274 sq mi)

Basin features
- Progression: Jasenica→ Great Morava→ Danube→ Black Sea

The Kubršnica (Serbian Cyrillic: Кубршница) is a river in Šumadija region of central Serbia, a 42 km-long left and the longest tributary to the Jasenica river.

The Kubršnica originates from the Venčac mountain, in the Jasenica sub-region of Šumadija, in the wider area of the town of Aranđelovac. The terrain in the source area of the river is rich in marble and fireclay. The river flows to the east, next to the Aranđelovac's suburb of Banja and turns north near Topola.

After the villages of Krćevac and Zagorica, the Kubršnica receives from the left its major tributary, the Veliki Lug, near the village of Ratari and enters the eastern half of the Veliko Pomoravlje as it turns to the east again. After it passes next to the village of Glibovac and the town of Smederevska Palanka, it empties into the Jasenica river.

Its tributary, Veliki Lug, was described in March 2019 by the environmentalists a "conditional river", because for a long time it has been notorious for the pollution. The river is so devastated by the communal and industrial waste from Mladenovac, Sopot and nearby settlements, that it turned into an open wastewater collector.

The eastern river valley is a natural route for the section of the Belgrade-Niš railroad, while the Belgrade-Kragujevac road passes through the western part. The Kubršnica belongs to the Black Sea drainage basin, drains and area of 709 km^{2} itself, and it is not navigable. The lower parts of the flow are regulated to prevent floods during rainy years, but not to greater effect.

== Sources ==
- Jovan Đ. Marković (1990): Enciklopedijski geografski leksikon Jugoslavije; Svjetlost-Sarajevo; ISBN 86-01-02651-6
