= Ropočevo =

Ropočevo Ропочево
- Neighborhood of Sopot
- Location within Serbia
- Coordinates: 44°31′N 20°34′E
- Country: Serbia
- District: Belgrade
- Municipality: Sopot

Population (2022)
  - Total: 2,546
- Time zone: UTC+1 (CET)
  - Summer (DST): UTC+2 (CEST)

Ropočevo (Serbian Cyrillic: Ропочево) is a neighborhood of Sopot, a suburb of Belgrade, Serbia. According to the 2022 census, it had a population of 2,546 inhabitants.

Formerly a separate settlement, it was abolished as such in October 2019 by the City Assembly of Belgrade, and annexed to its municipal seat, Sopot. Ropočevo was completely encircling Sopot, as two settlements already formed one urban unit. However, the government has not amended the Law on Territorial Organization accordingly, so Ropočevo remained de-jure separate, appearing as such in the 2022 census.

== Location and geography ==
Ropočevo is located on the Ripanj Plateau of the Kosmaj mountain, spreading over the altitudes from 195 to 248 m (640 to 814 ft). It is situated in the spring area of Veliki Lug, a tributary to the Kubršnica. There are several other water springs in the village area: Drmink, Alinac, Pavitine, Glogovac, etc. It spreads on both sides of the Belgrade-Mladenovac railway, just north of Sopot.

== Name ==
There are no historical documents which point to the origin of the village name. In time three popular theories developed, none of which is taken seriously in consideration. One myth claims that Despot Stefan Lazarević, who died somewhere on the Kosmaj mountain, suffered a death rattle on this location (Serbian ropac). Another jovial story claims the same word origin, but regarding some local Turkish pasha. Third was laid by professor Milivoj Pavlović in his 1969 article "From Singidunum to Kosmaj". He claimed the name is of Celtic origin. The Serbs mixed with the local Celtic population and named the locality arp, Celtic word for the slope, which in time molded into rop.

== History ==
The village was mentioned for the first time in 1528, in Ottoman documents, under the name Hrbočevo. It had 14 houses and one unmarried man. Neighboring village of Lunjevica, with 13 houses, was also mentioned. Ottoman census showed that the villagers paid a total tax of 5,260 akçe. They paid it on wheat, barley, barley-rye mix, hemp, cabbage, beehives, watermelons, wood, pigs, wine barrels and marriages, which indicates an affluent village. Located between Ropočevo and Ralja, this village disappeared from history. In the early 18th century it was mentioned by the German travelers as Robotschewo.

A notable participant in the First Serbian Uprising, Kapetan Dragić (1777–1817), was born in Ropočevo.

In the 19th century, Ropočevo was much more important than modern municipal seat Sopot. It has its own municipality and was one of the largest villages in this part of Šumadija. The village had a school, church and was known for its blacksmiths and furriers. Sopot was barely mentioned up to the 1860s, when it became known for its own craftsmen and shops. In 1882, Municipality of Ropočevo filed a motion to declare Sopot varošica (small town). The motion was rejected at the time.

The post office was opened in 1907 and agricultural cooperative in 1909. The village was electrified in 1955 and reached by the asphalt road in 1956. In 1960 it was connected to the Grocka water supply system, but majority of homes still used water from individual wells and water springs. Phone lines were established in 1970.

Tides began to turn in the rivalry between Ropočevo and Sopot after World War II, especially after the 1970s. Being encircled by Ropočevo, Sopot couldn't physically expand and overrun the neighboring village in population, but was becoming more important administratively. Ropočevo lost its municipal status and the newly established local community, which comprised both settlements, was named after and seated in Sopot, which attained a statistical town status by 1991.

== Characteristics ==
Historical population
| Year | Pop. | ±% p.a. |
|---|---|---|
| 1921 | 1,953 | — |
| 1931 | 2,269 | +1.51% |
| 1948 | 2,247 | −0.06% |
| 1953 | 2,251 | +0.04% |
| 1961 | 2,179 | −0.41% |
| 1971 | 2,062 | −0.55% |
| 1981 | 1,869 | −0.98% |
| 1991 | 2,004 | +0.70% |
| 2002 | 2,363 | +1.51% |
| 2011 | 2,628 | +1.19% |
| 2022 | 2,546 | −0.29% |

The settlement is not a compact one but rather diffused, consisting of six localities: three older, Venac, Alinac, Obršina, and three younger, Lovene, Senje and Orlovac. Administratively, by the 2010s Ropočevo completely encircled Sopot, "like a ring". Two settlements were even joined in one cadaster land parcel, with 2.573 ha (6.36 acres).

== Economy ==
A marble quarry was opened in the village in 1887, and was closed in 1958. By the 1990s, Ropočevo developed into the suburban agricultural and fruit-growing settlement, with 11,8% of agricultural population.

== Population ==
Population is predominantly Serbian. It is mostly settled by the families from Montenegro, Bosnia, Gruža, Jasenica, Kačer (region), eastern Serbia, surroundings of Vranje and Sjenica. Main family slavas are Saint John the Baptist, Saint Peter, Mratindan, George's Day in Autumn, Saint Nicholas and Aranđelovdan. The village slava is Intercession of the Theotokos.

Settlement grew until World War II. The village experienced a depopulation in the 1948-1981 period, with the population dropping from 2,247 in 1948 to 1,869 in 1981. Since then, the population began to grow. After reaching a peak in 2011 with a population of 2,628, Ropočevo depopulated again for the first time after 40 years, to 2,546 in 2022.

== Administration ==
Though Ropočevo was statistically separate settlement from Sopot, the two conjoined settlements formed one local community (mesna zajednica), sub-municipal administrative unit.

In 1975, Belgrade City Assembly filed a motion to abolish Ropočevo's status as a separate settlement, but it failed. In October 2019, city assembly finally adopted the motion and merged Ropočevo with Sopot, which by this move more than doubled its population, from 1,920 to 4,548.
