= Junkovac =

Junkovac may refer to the following places in Serbia:

- Junkovac (Lazarevac), village in Lazarevac municipality
- Junkovac (Topola), village in Topola municipality
