= Kacer =

Kacer, Kačer or Káčer may refer to:

- Kačer, village in Serbia
- Kačer (region), a region in Serbia

== People with the surname ==
- Jan Kačer (born 1936), Czech actor and film producer
- Kathy Kacer (born 1954), Canadian writer
- Miroslav Káčer (born 1996), Slovak footballer
- Rastislav Káčer (born 1965), Slovak diplomat, Minister of Foreign Affairs (2022-)
