= Jelenac =

- Village
- Location within Serbia
- Coordinates: 44°20′25″N 20°42′17″E
- Country: Serbia
- District: Šumadija District
- Municipality: Topola

Population (2011)
  - Total: 329
- Time zone: UTC+1 (CET)
  - Summer (DST): UTC+2 (CEST)

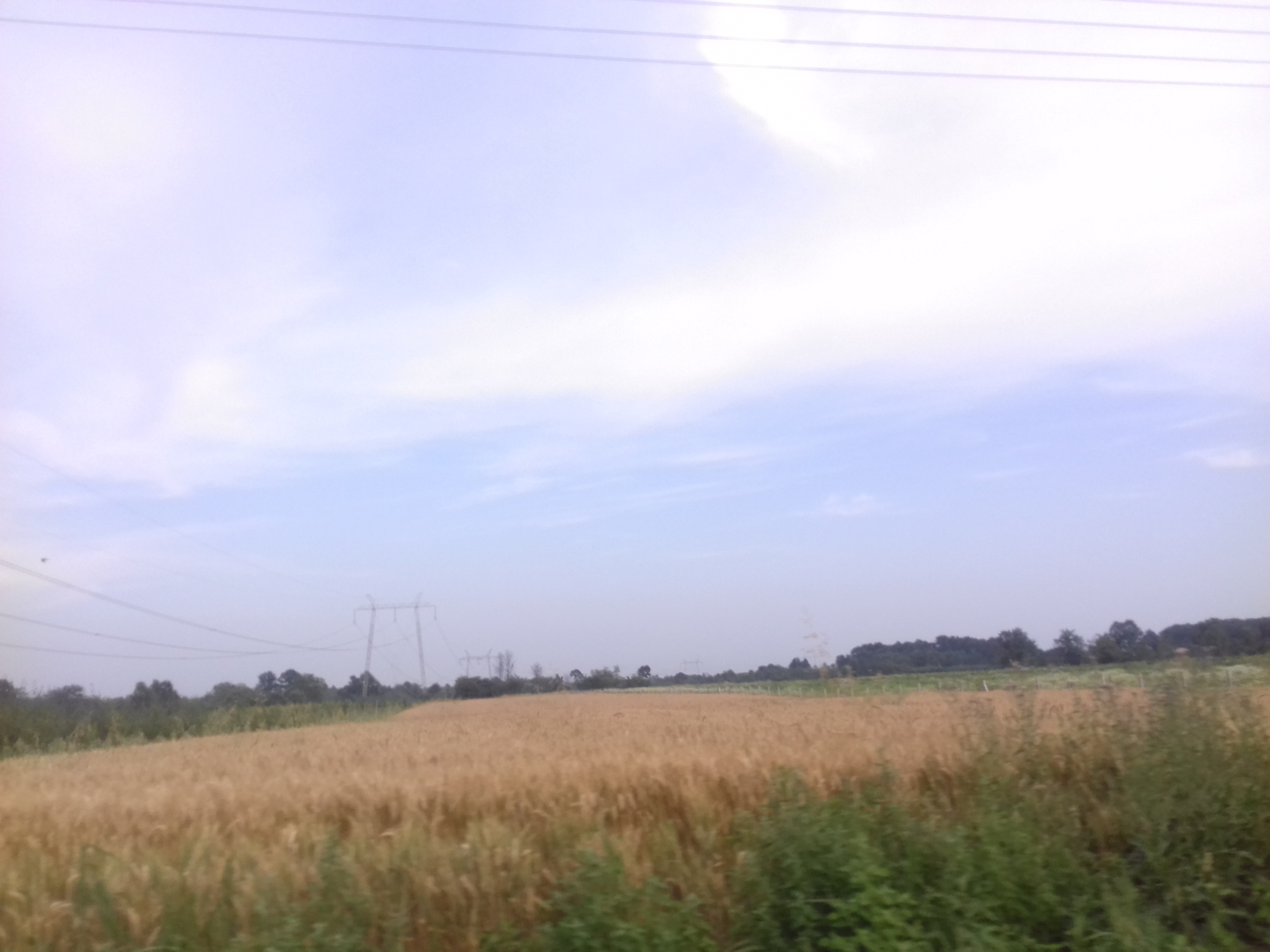

Jelenac (Serbian: Јеленац) is a village in the municipality of Topola, Serbia. At the 2011 census, the village had a population of 329.
