= Pavlovac, Topola =

Pavlovac Павловац
- Village
- Location within Serbia
- Coordinates: 44°13′N 20°48′E
- Country: Serbia
- District: Šumadija District
- Municipality: Topola

Population (2011)
  - Total: 55
- Time zone: UTC+1 (CET)
  - Summer (DST): UTC+2 (CEST)

Pavlovac (Serbian: Павловац) is a village in the municipality of Topola, Serbia. According to the 2011 census, the village had a population of 55 people.
