= Gojna Gora =

- Village
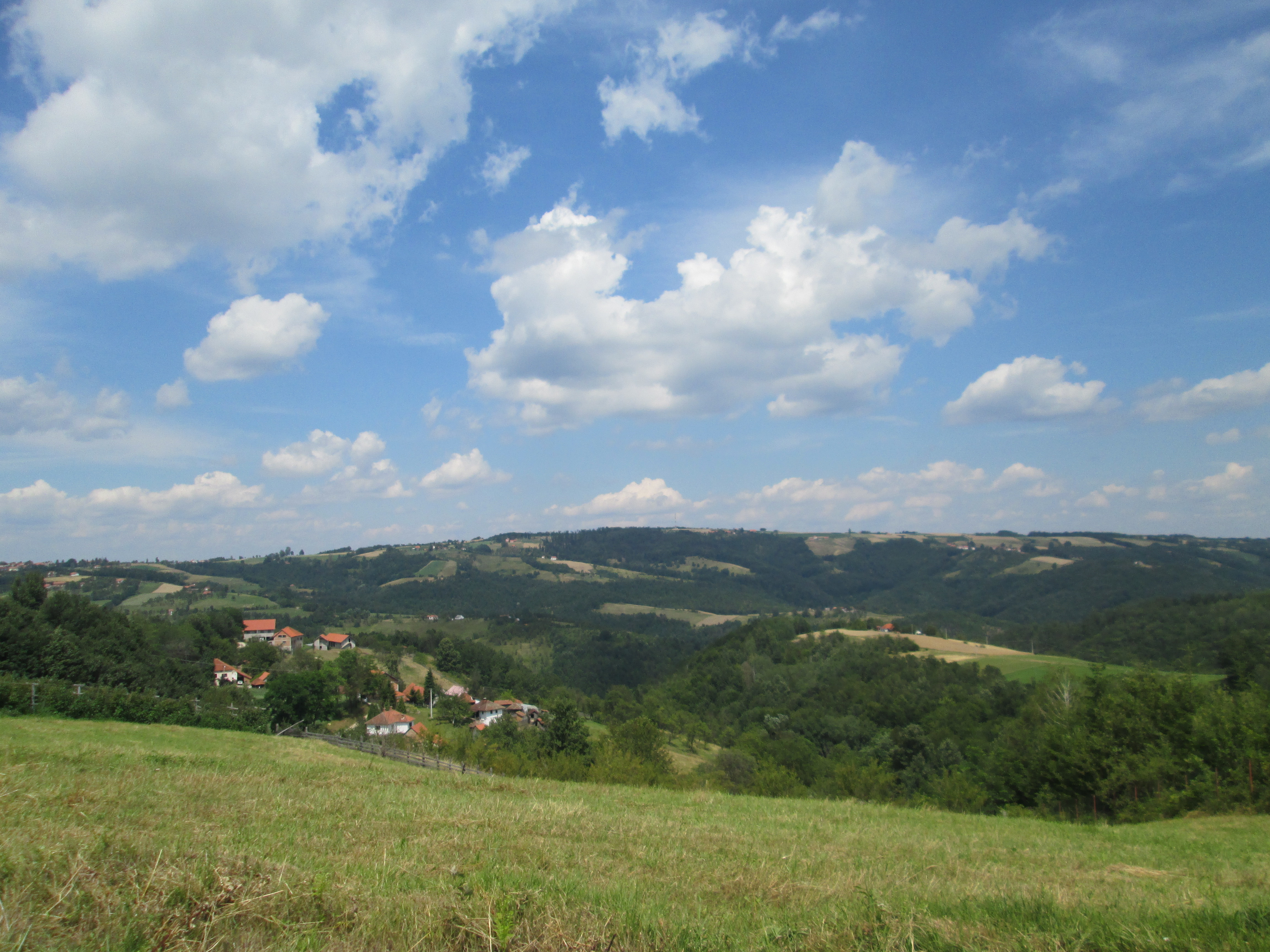
- View over the village

- Location within Serbia
- Coordinates: 43°59′20″N 20°07′41″E
- Country: Serbia
- District: Moravica District
- Municipality: Gornji Milanovac

Population (2002)
  - Total: 735
- Time zone: UTC+1 (CET)
  - Summer (DST): UTC+2 (CEST)

Gojna Gora is a village in the municipality of Gornji Milanovac, Serbia. According to the 2002 census, the village has a population of 735 people.
