= Darinka Radović =

Darinka Radović Даринка Радовић
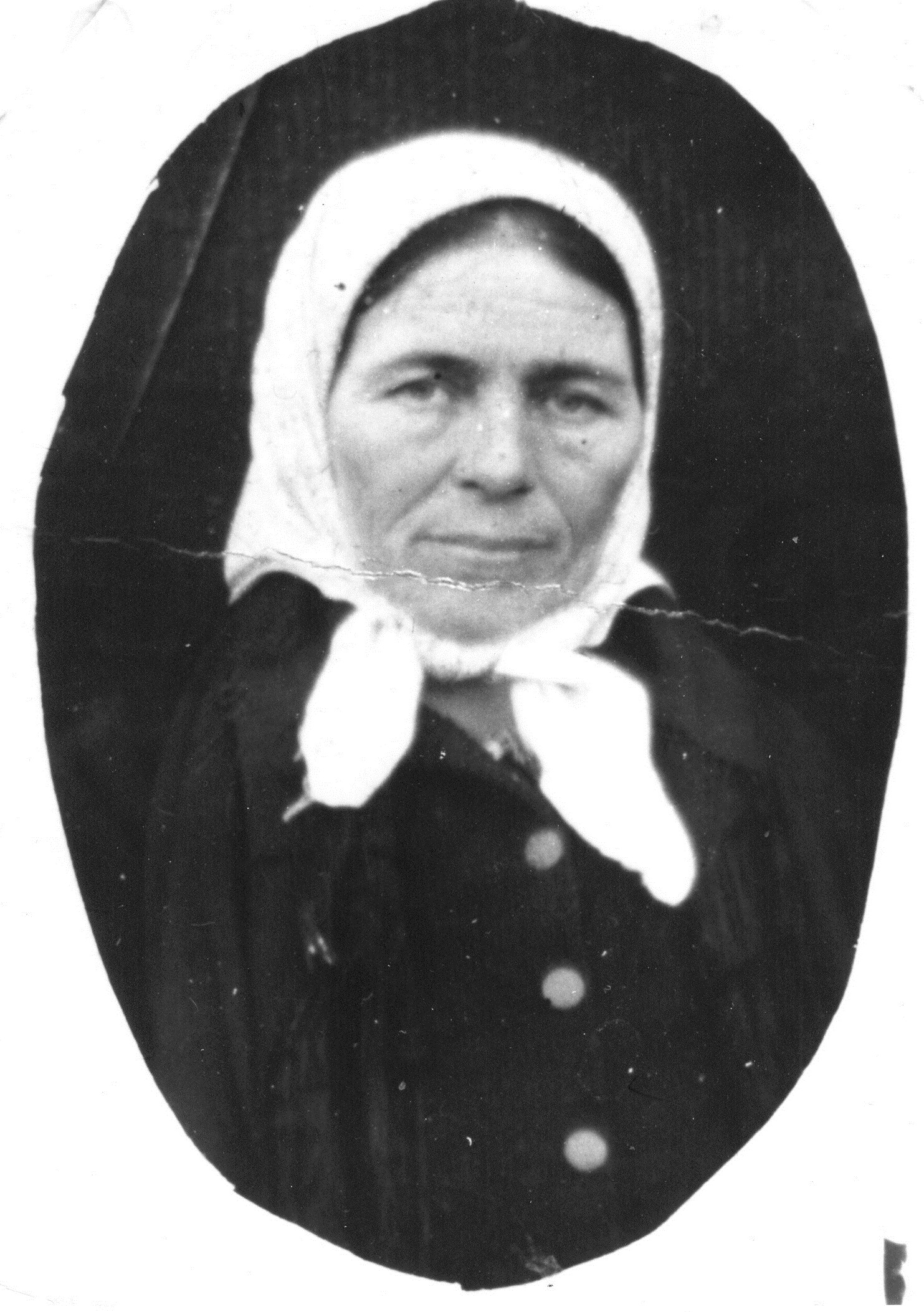
- Born: Kloka, Kingdom of Serbia
- Died: Rajkovac, Territory of the Military Commander in Serbia

Darinka Radović (Serbian Cyrillic: Даринка Радовић) (Kloka, 6 January 1896 – Rajkovac 23 May 1943) was a manual worker in agriculture and an activist for the Yugoslav Partisans during World War II in Yugoslavia and a People's Hero of Yugoslavia. She was killed together with her two daughters in May 1943 by Chetniks forces.

== Biography ==
Darinka was born as a third child and first daughter in a poor patriarchal family in the village of Kloka in January 1896. Since she was born on a Serbian Orthodox religious holiday, she received the name Darinka (the word dar meaning gift) from her godfather, as she was considered to be a gift from God. At the time of her youth, it was uncommon for girls in rural Kingdom of Serbia to be sent to school, so Darinka never had a formal education and stayed illiterate. She brought a sewing machine as a dowry at the time of her wedding. In 1941, her husband Vojislav, a Royal Yugoslav Army soldier, was sent to Nazi Germany as a POW.

In 1942, she started accepting Yugoslav Partisans into her home, providing them with food and shelter. Together with some other villagers, she started to make clothes for them as well. Through this contact, she and her two daughters learned more about the political ideas of the Partisans. She convinced other women in the village to help Partisans and served as a messenger by delivering messages to other villages.

Once the Chetniks took control of the area, they learned about Darinka and her daughters' activities and raided her home, searching for a wounded Partisan soldier. Darinka and her daughters refused to tell them his location, claiming there was no one else on their property. The Chetniks then took them to the church yard, where they beat them. Unable to obtain the information they wanted, the Chetniks started to torture the 14-year-old Stanka, threatening Darinka they will slit her throat if she does not tell them where the wounded Partisan is and who else in the village is helping the Partisans. Darika didn't say a word and the Chetniks killed Stanka. Then they took her 20-year-old daughter Radmila and slit her throat as well. In the end, they killed Darinka as well.

By the Decree of the Yugoslav president Josip Broz Tito, Darinka Radović was declared People's Hero of Yugoslavia on 9 October 1953.
