= Lipovac (Topola) =

- Village
- Location within Serbia
- Coordinates: 44°15′27″N 20°38′18″E
- Country: Serbia
- District: Šumadija District
- Municipality: Topola

Population (2002)
  - Total: 558
- Time zone: UTC+1 (CET)
  - Summer (DST): UTC+2 (CEST)

Lipovac (Serbian: Липовац) is a village in the municipality of Topola, Serbia. According to the 2002 census, the village has a population of 558 people.
