= Žabare (Topola) =

- Village
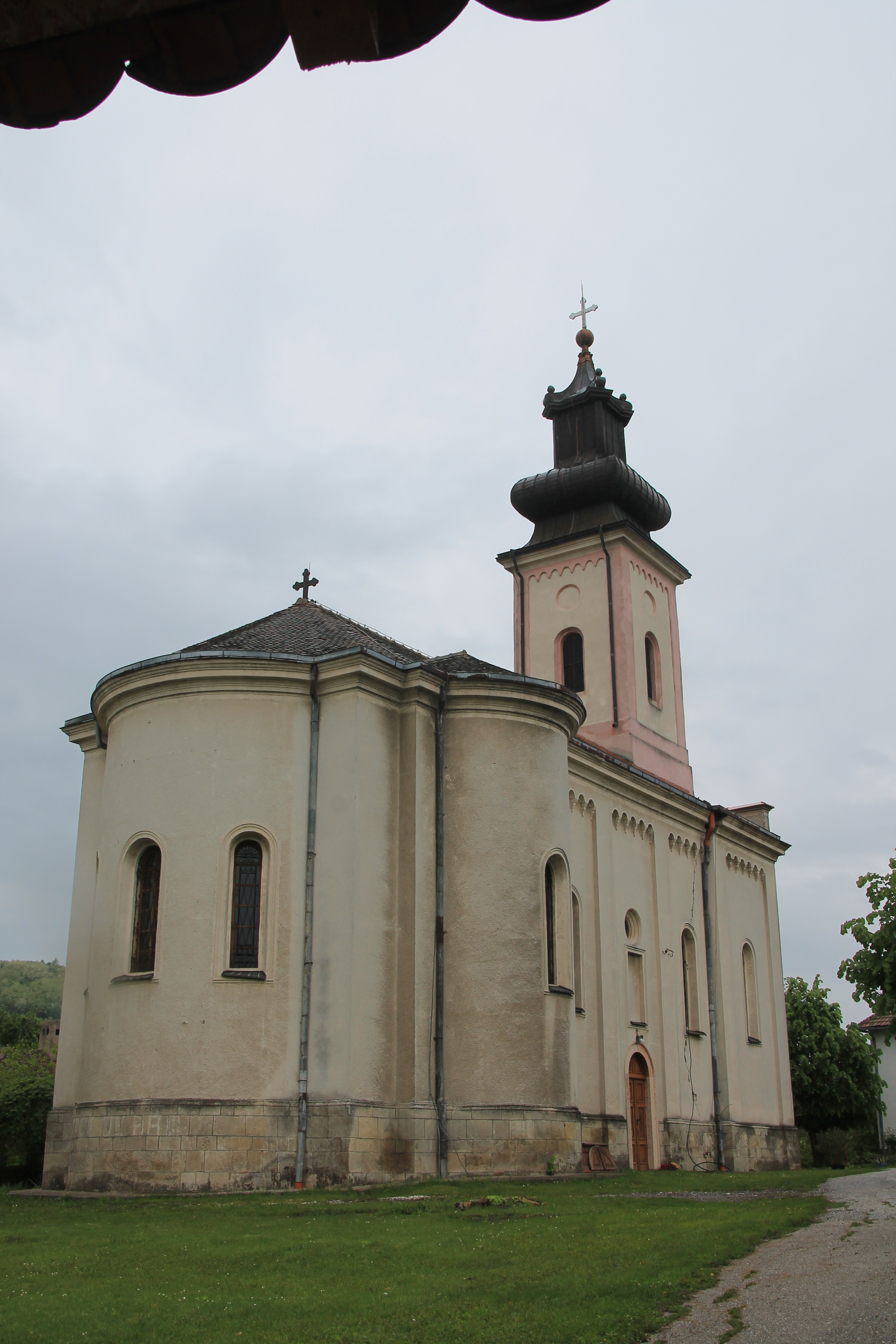

- Location within Serbia
- Coordinates: 44°15′20″N 20°43′49″E
- Country: Serbia
- District: Šumadija District
- Municipality: Topola
- Time zone: UTC+1 (CET)
  - Summer (DST): UTC+2 (CEST)

Žabare is a village in the municipality of Topola, Serbia. According to the 2002 census, the village has a population of 1016 people.
