= Božurnja =

- Village
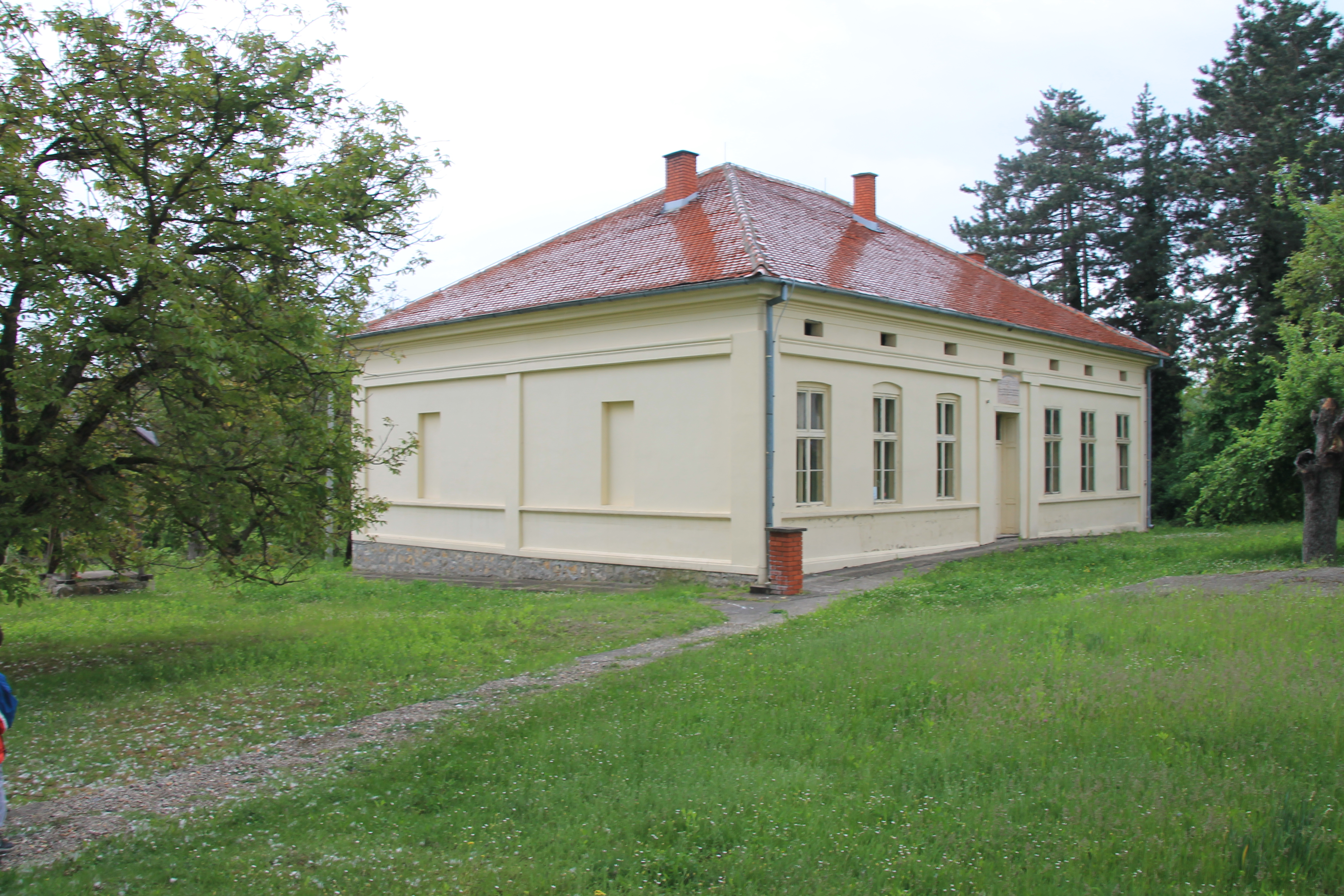

- Location within Serbia
- Coordinates: 44°13′N 20°42′E
- Country: Serbia
- District: Šumadija District
- Municipality: Topola

Population (2002)
  - Total: 672
- Time zone: UTC+1 (CET)
  - Summer (DST): UTC+2 (CEST)

Božurnja (Serbian: Божурња) is a village in the municipality of Topola, Serbia. According to the 2002 census, the village had a population of 672 people.
