= Donja Trešnjevica =

- Village
- Location within Serbia
- Coordinates: 44°13′N 20°34′E
- Country: Serbia
- District: Šumadija District
- Municipality: Topola

Population (2002)
  - Total: 304
- Time zone: UTC+1 (CET)
  - Summer (DST): UTC+2 (CEST)

Donja Trešnjevica (Serbian: Доња Трешњевица) is a village in the municipality of Topola, Serbia. According to the 2002 census, the village has a population of 304 people.
