= Vinca (disambiguation) =

Vinca is one of two genera of plants with the common name Periwinkle.

Vinca may also refer to:

== People ==
- Juozas Vinča (1905–1990), Lithuanian boxer
- Vinca Petersen (born c. 1973), British photographer

== Places ==
- Vinça, a commune of the Pyrénées-Orientales département in France
  - Canton of Vinça, former canton that contained Vinça commune
- Vinca, Hungarian name for Vinţa village, Lupșa commune, Alba County, Romania
- Vinča, a suburb of Belgrade, Serbia
- Vinča (Topola), village in Topola municipality, Serbia

== Plants ==
- Catharanthus, genus of flowering plants, the species of which are commonly called, as with Vinca species, Periwinkle
- Catharanthus roseus, annual bedding plant, formerly included in the Vinca genus as Vinca rosea. It shares its common name Periwinkle with Vinca species

== Other ==
- Vinča culture, Neolithic culture of the Balkans, 5400–4500 BC
- Vinca massacre, 1944 massacre of Italian citizens by the SS

== See also ==
- Vesna de Vinča (born 19567), Serbian writer and producer
