= Rajkovac (Topola) =

- Village
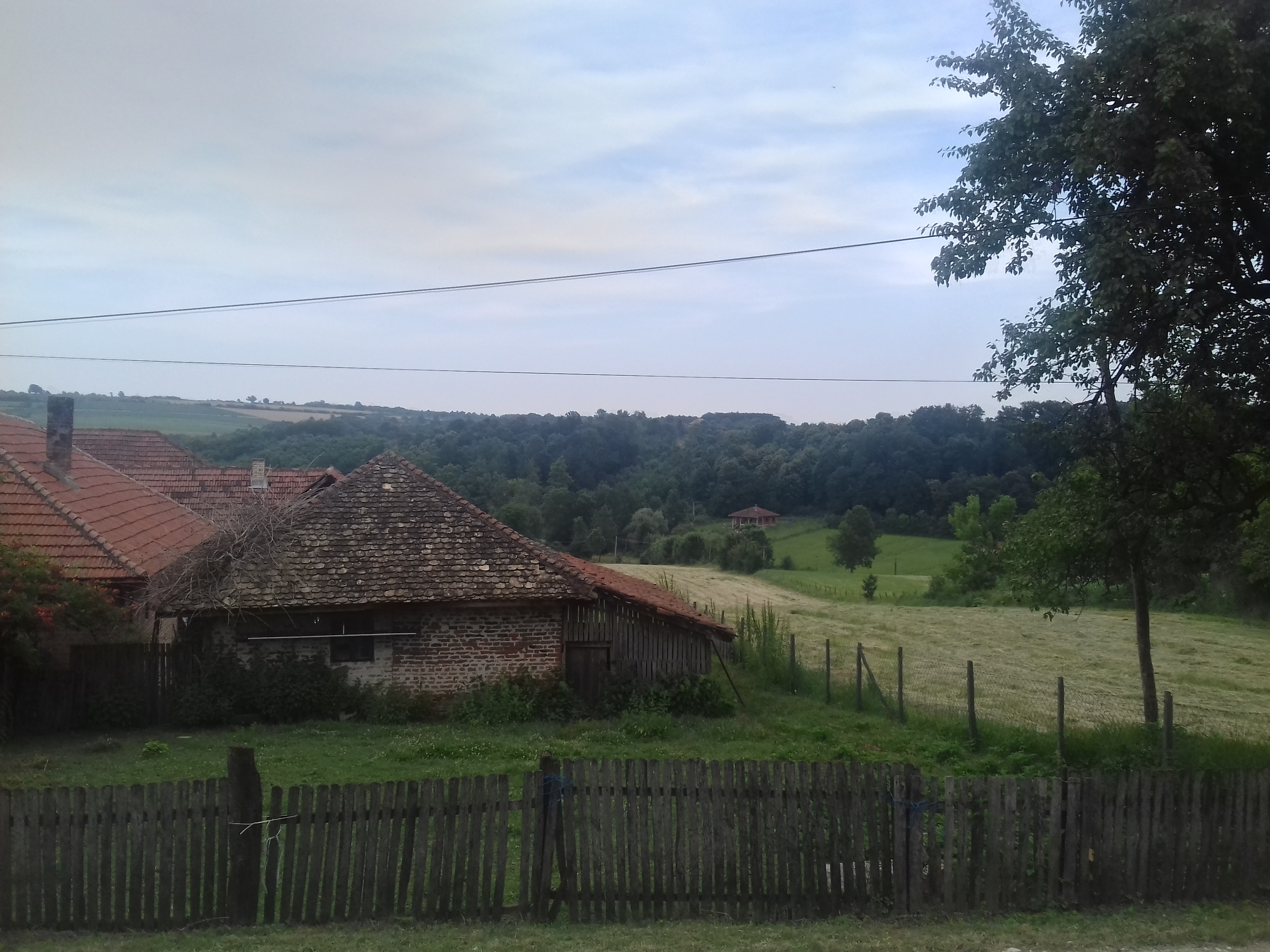

- Location within Serbia
- Coordinates: 44°19′20″N 20°45′18″E
- Country: Serbia
- District: Šumadija District
- Municipality: Topola

Population (2002)
  - Total: 189
- Time zone: UTC+1 (CET)
  - Summer (DST): UTC+2 (CEST)

Rajkovac (Serbian: Рајковац) is a village in the municipality of Topola, Serbia. According to the 2002 census, the village has a population of 189 people.

== Notable residents ==
- Darinka Radović
