= Maskar, Topola =

Maskar Маскар
- Village
- Location within Serbia
- Coordinates: 44°20′04″N 20°43′35″E
- Country: Serbia
- District: Šumadija District
- Municipality: Topola

Population (2011)
  - Total: 206
- Time zone: UTC+1 (CET)
  - Summer (DST): UTC+2 (CEST)

Maskar (Serbian: Маскар) is a village in the municipality of Topola, Serbia. According to the 2011 census, the village has a population of 206 people.
