= Belosavci =

Coordinates: 44.3331°N 20.7033°E

- Village
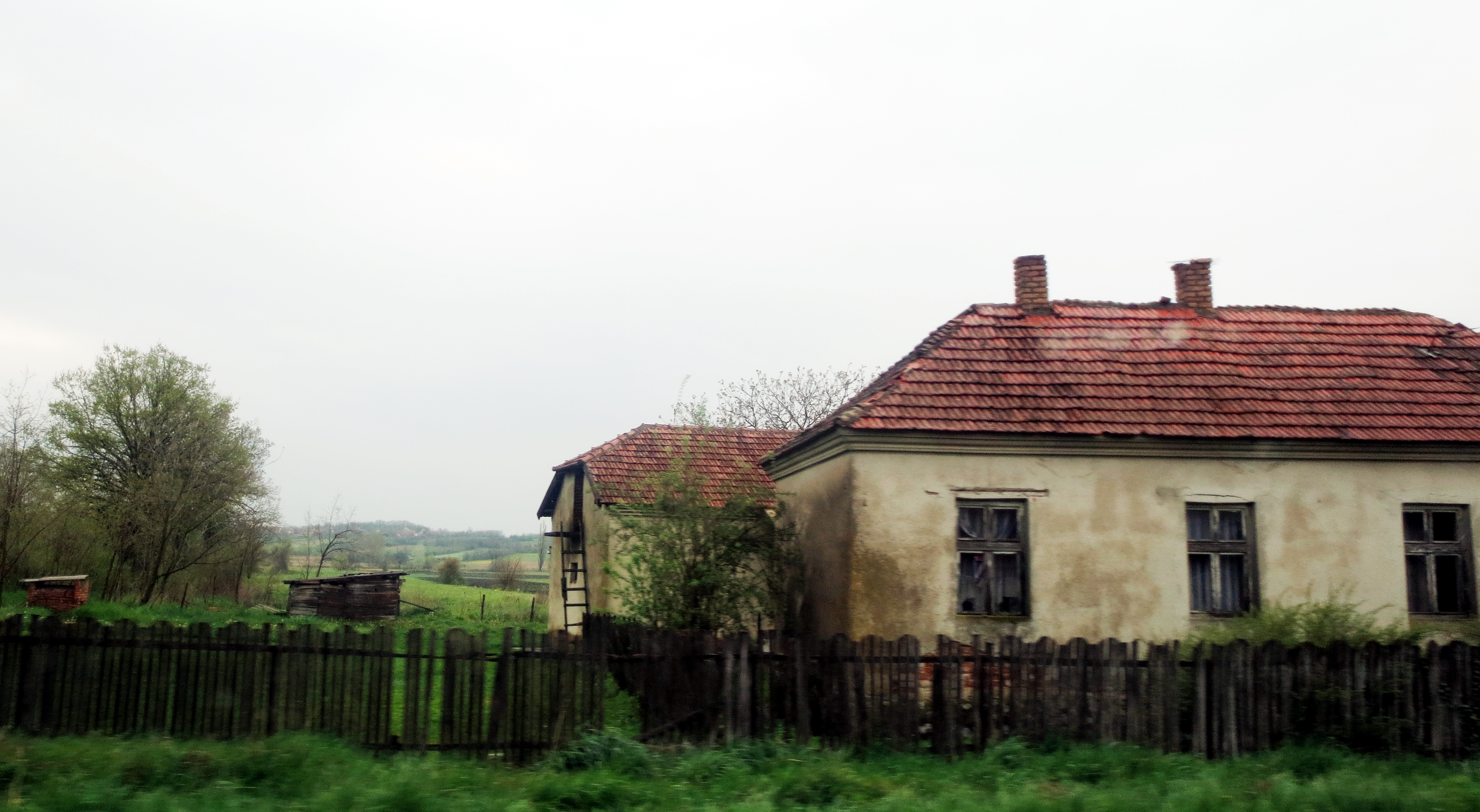
- Building in Belosavci Village
- Interactive map of Belosavci
- Country: Serbia
- District: Šumadija District
- Municipality: Topola

Population (2011)
  - Total: 1,017
- Time zone: UTC+1 (CET)
  - Summer (DST): UTC+2 (CEST)

Belosavci (Serbian: Белосавци) is a village in the municipality of Topola, Serbia. According to the 2002 census, the village has a population of 1182 people.
