= Kloka =

- Village
- Location within Serbia
- Coordinates: 44°17′57″N 20°47′24″E
- Country: Serbia
- District: Šumadija District
- Municipality: Topola

Population (2002)
  - Total: 1,146
- Time zone: UTC+1 (CET)
  - Summer (DST): UTC+2 (CEST)

Kloka (Serbian: Клока) is a village in the municipality of Topola, Serbia. According to the 2002 census, the village had a population of 1,146.

== Notable residents ==
- Darinka Radović
