= Gorovič =

- Village
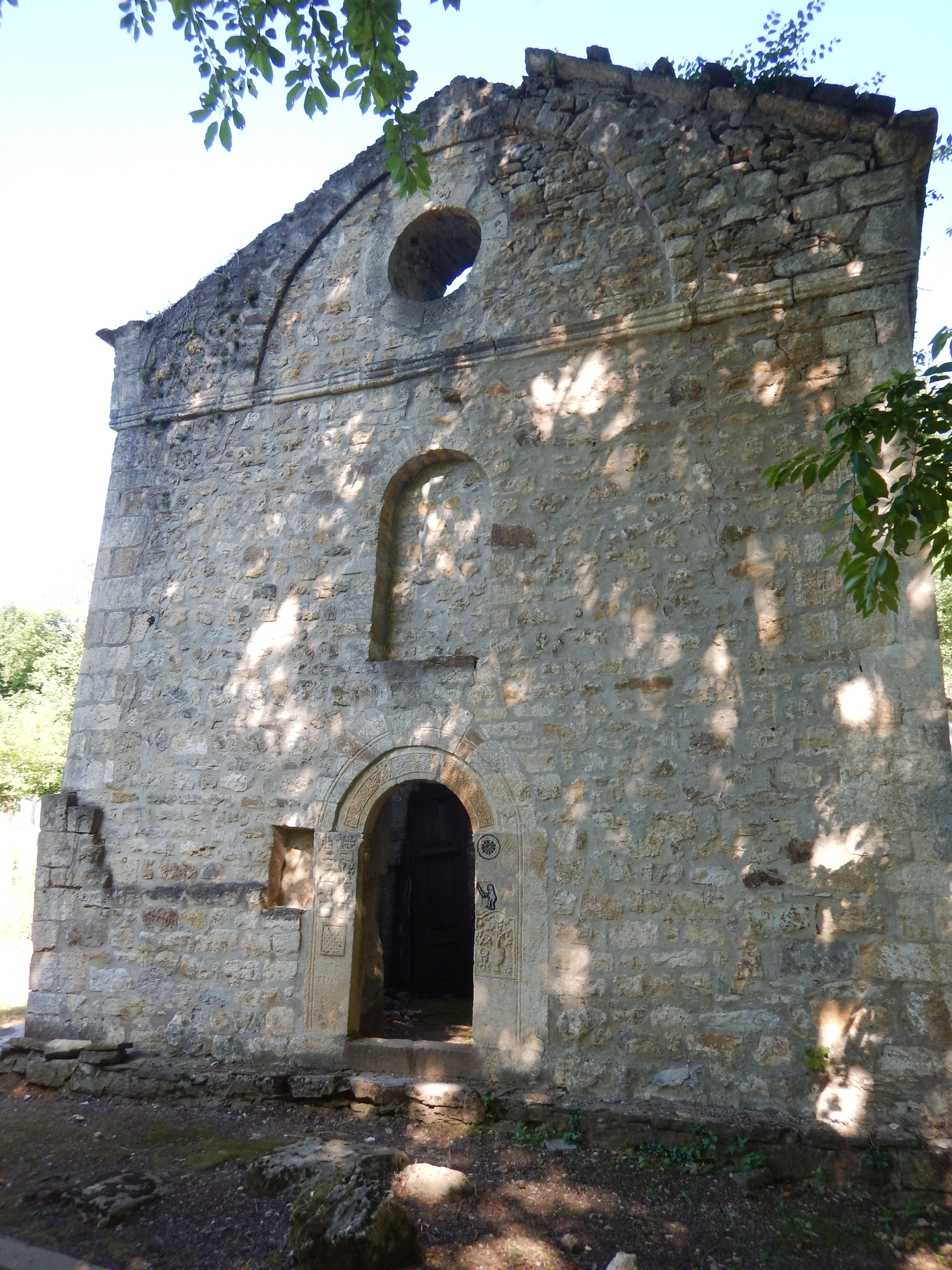
- The Church of the Transfiguration of Christ in Gorovich is an immovable cultural property - a cultural monument since March 19, 1969.

- Location within Serbia
- Coordinates: 44°14′N 20°45′E
- Country: Serbia
- District: Šumadija District
- Municipality: Topola

Population (2002)
  - Total: 319
- Time zone: UTC+1 (CET)
  - Summer (DST): UTC+2 (CEST)

Gorovič (Serbian: Горович) is a village in the municipality of Topola, Serbia. According to the 2002 census, the village has a population of 319 people.
