= Budovar =

Budovar (Будовар)

Location
- Country: Vojvodina, Serbia

Physical characteristics
- Source
  - location: Fruška Gora, at Čortanovci
  - elevation: 215 m (705 ft)
- Mouth
  - location: Danube, at Stari Banovci
  - coordinates: 44.9815°N 20.2852°E
- Length: 52 km (32 mi)

Basin features
- Progression: Danube→ Black Sea

The Budovar (Serbian Cyrillic: Будовар) is a river in northern Serbia, a 52 km-long right tributary to the Danube in the Srem region of the Vojvodina province.

The Budovar is a system of natural and channeled water flow of Patka-Budovar. It originates from the eastern slopes of the Fruška Gora mountain, near the village of Čortanovci as the Patka (Cyrillic: Патка) at an altitude of 215 m. The river flows to the southeast, through the village of Beška, where it is crossed by the Belgrade-Novi Sad highway. After it receives the smaller stream from the left near the village of Krčedin, the river is known as the Budovar. The river turns south and flows parallel to the highway, next to the village of Novi Karlovci, before it empties into the Danube at the village of Stari Banovci.

The Budovar belongs to the Black Sea drainage basin and it is not navigable.
