= Topola (village) =

Coordinates: 44°15′54″N 20°40′20″E

Topola Топола
- Village
- Interactive map of Topola
- Country: Serbia
- District: Šumadija District
- Municipality: Topola

Population (2002)
  - Total: 1,363
- Time zone: UTC+1 (CET)
  - Summer (DST): UTC+2 (CEST)

Topola ((Serbian Cyrillic: Топола) is a village in the municipality of Topola, Serbia. According to the 2002 census, the village has a population of 1363 people.
