= Krćevac =

Krćevac Крћевац
- Village
- Location in Serbia
- Coordinates: 44°18′2″N 20°41′17″E
- Country: Serbia
- Region: Šumadija
- District: Šumadija District
- Municipality: Topola

Population (2002)
  - Total: 775
  - Ethnicities: Serbs 98.7% Montenegrins 1.03% Croats 0.12% Muslims 0.12%

Krćevac (Serbian: Крћевац) is a village in the Topola municipality of the Šumadija District in central Serbia, located 3.9 km from Zagorica and 5.2 km from Topola.

== Etymology ==
The name "Krćevac" stems from krčanje meaning "burning/clearing of forest". The region of Šumadija is densely wooded and so the village owes its name to the intense forest clearing effort that was undertaken when the area was settled. Local lore holds that the area of today's Krćevac burned for three months before the land became clear for farming.

== History ==
The village was active in the Serbian Revolution, being organized into the knežina (administrative unit) of Kačer during the First Serbian Uprising (1804–13). Gavrilo Đurić (1775–1835), who slew the Kragujevac mutesellim, was from Krćevac. The Ottomans called the village a "house of hajduks" (ajdučka kuća) due to the wooded village serving as a safe haven for rebels in the uprising.

Prince Alexander Karađorđević had a fountain built in the village on 29 September 1858, on a farm field that he had inherited from his father, the leader of the uprising, Karađorđe Petrović. That land was later sold by the rival House of Obrenović.

== Demographics ==
According to the 1991 census data, the population was 794. According to the 2002 census, this had declined slightly to 775, composed of 636 adults, with an average age of 42.9 years (41.9 years among males and 43.8 years among females). There were 216 households in the village with an average of 3.59 members per household.

In 2002, Serbs constituted 98.7% of the population, Montenegrins 1.03%, Croats 0.12%, and Muslims 0.12%.

Changes in Number of Residents of Krćevac during the Twentieth Century

== Gallery ==
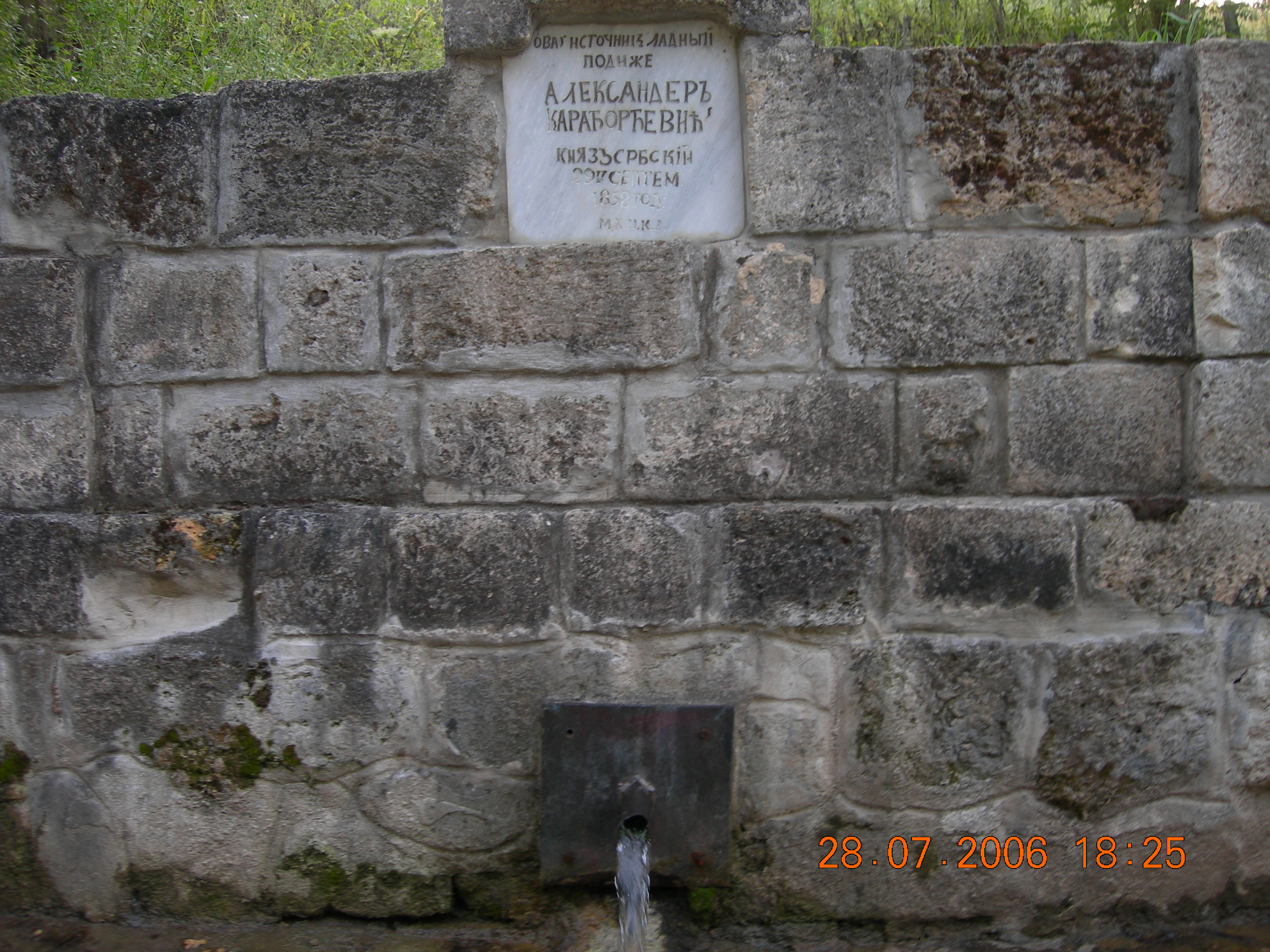
commonly referred to as Karađorđeva Česma

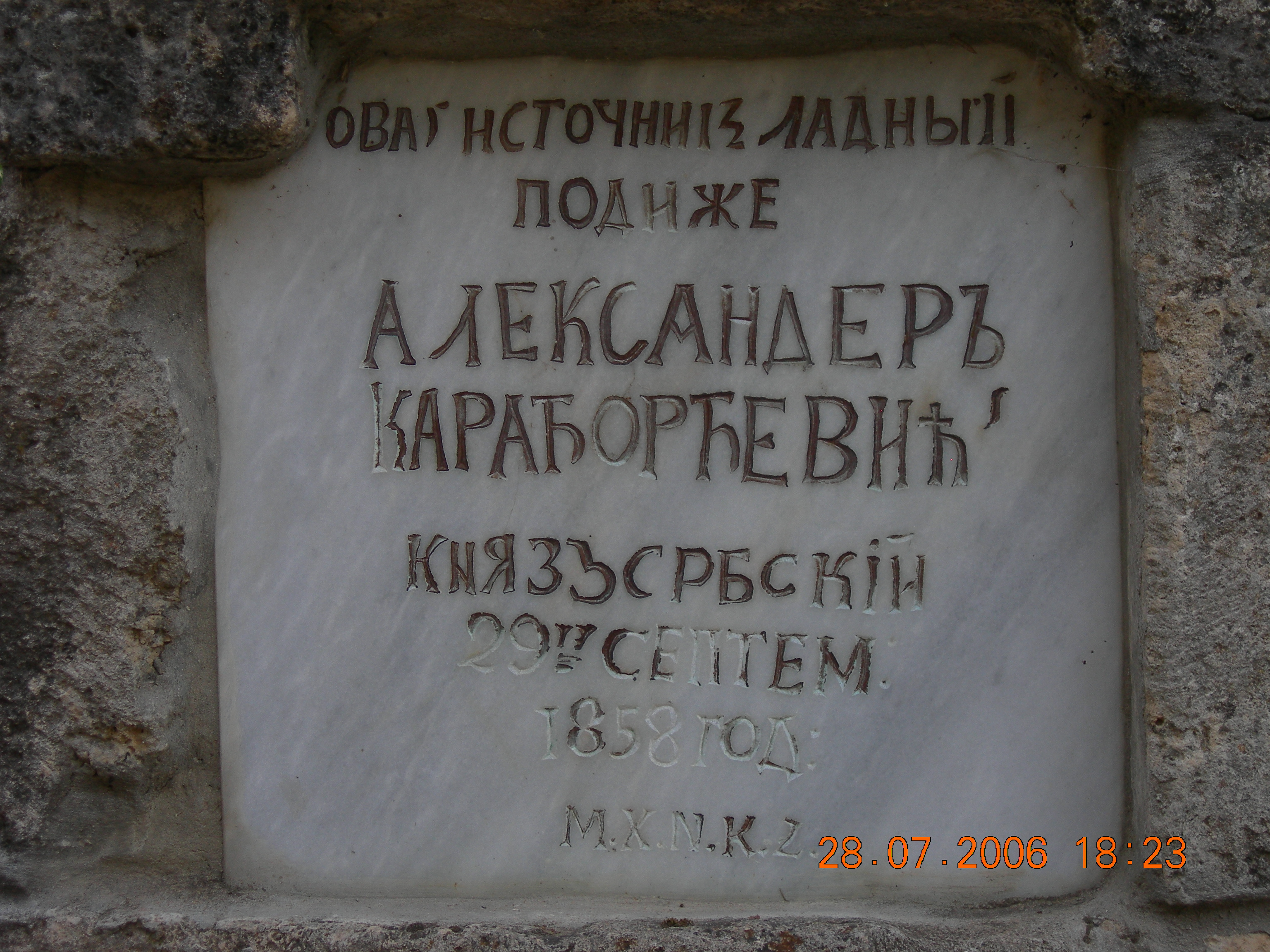
Close-up of the inscription on the fountain

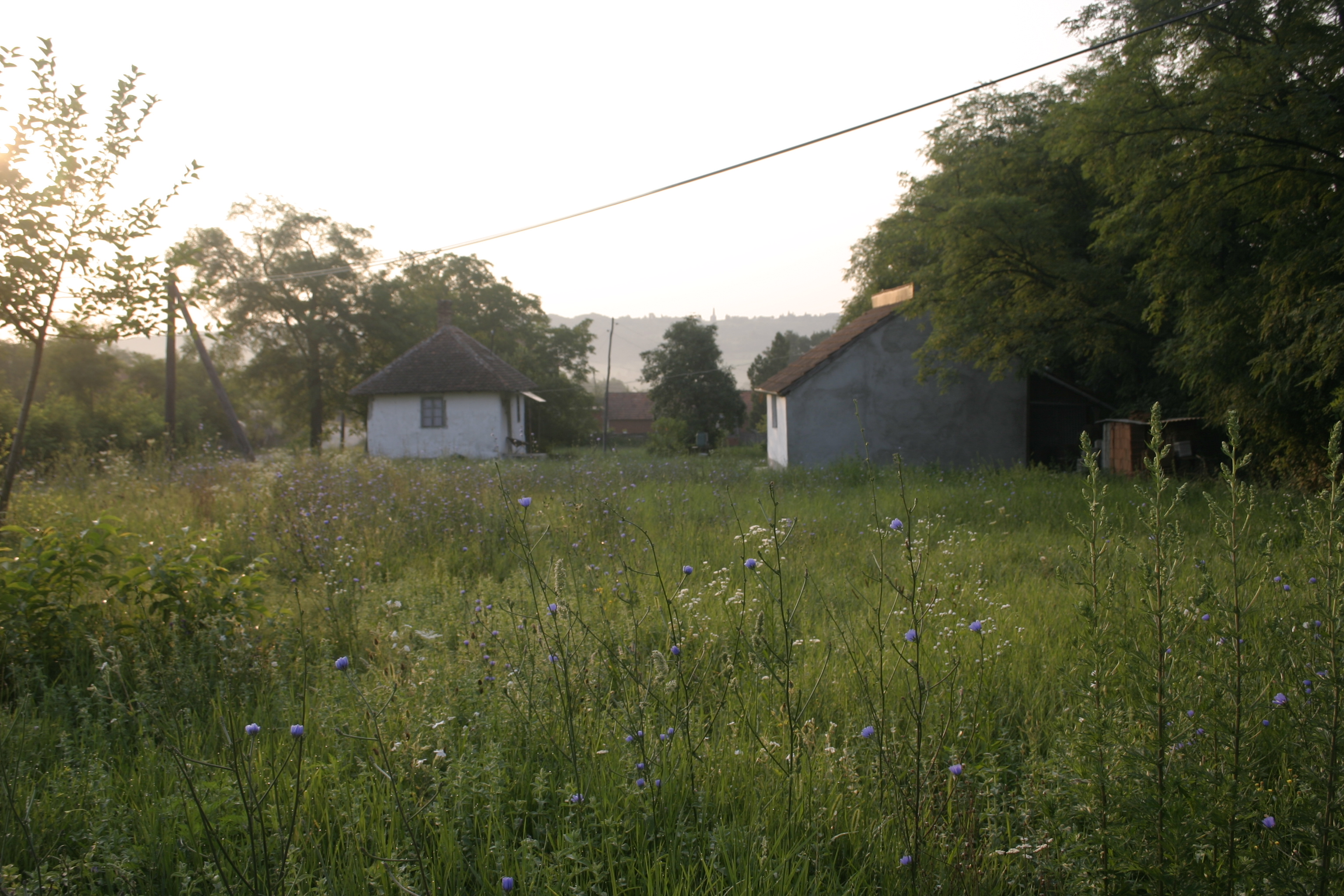
A road-side house and garden in Krćevac with the Zagorica church visible on the distant hilltop
