= Blaznava =

Coordinates: 44°19′59″N 20°42′12″E

- Village
- Interactive map of Blaznava
- Country: Serbia
- District: Šumadija District
- Municipality: Topola

Population (2002)
  - Total: 591
- Time zone: UTC+1 (CET)
  - Summer (DST): UTC+2 (CEST)

Blaznava (Serbian: Блазнава) is a village in the municipality of Topola, Serbia. According to the 2002 census, the village has a population of 591 people.
