= Čortanovci =

Čortanovci Чортановци (Serbian)
- Village (Selo)
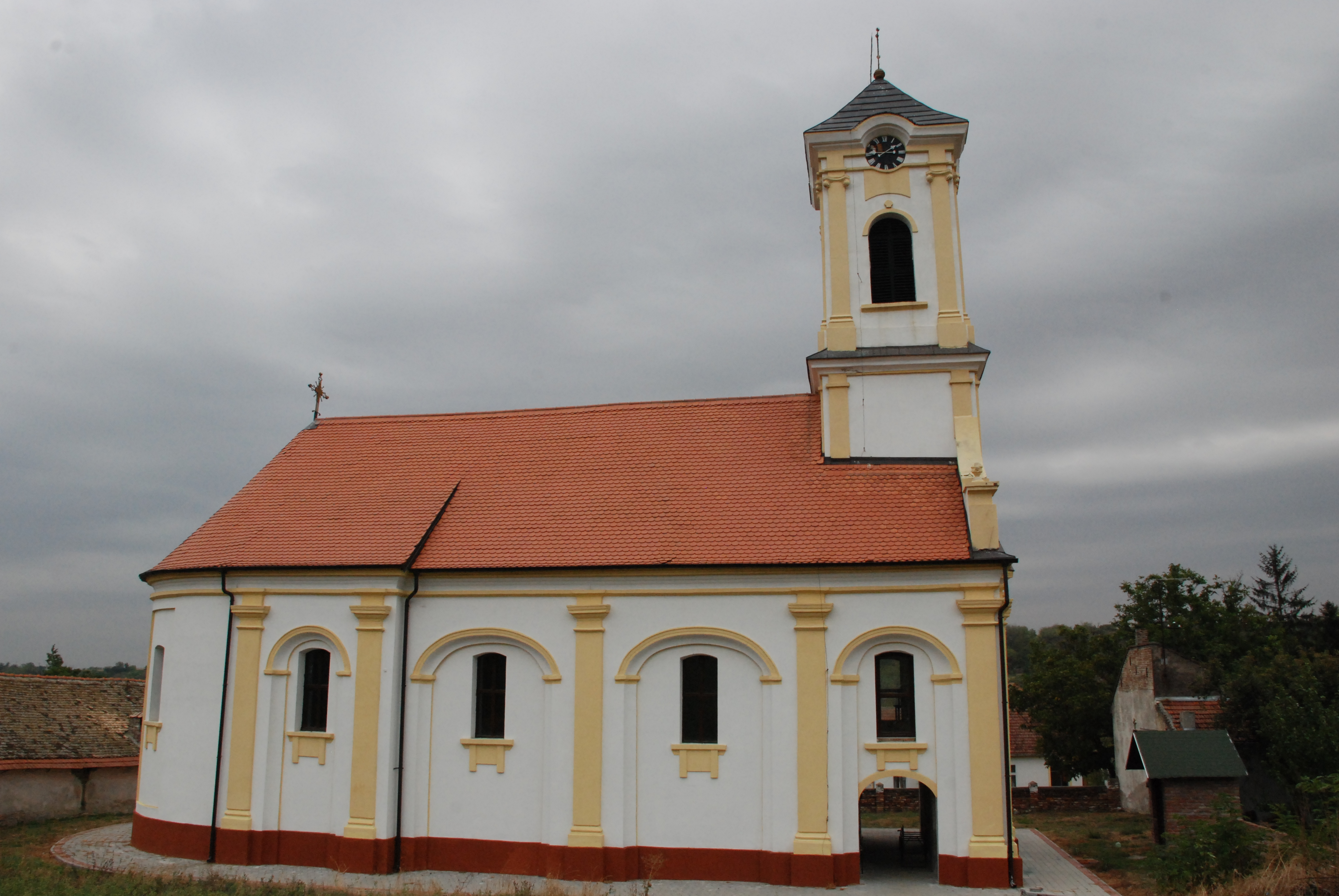
- Serbian Orthodox church
- Interactive map of Čortanovci
- Location within Vojvodina Location within Serbia Location within Europe
- Coordinates: 45°9′N 20°4′E
- Country: Serbia
- Province: Vojvodina
- District: Srem
- Municipality: Inđija

Area
  - Total: 37.1 km^{2} (14.3 sq mi)
- Elevation: 156 m (512 ft)

Population (2011)
  - Total: 2,337
  - Density: 63.0/km^{2} (163/sq mi)
- Time zone: UTC+1 (CET)
  - Summer (DST): UTC+2 (CEST)

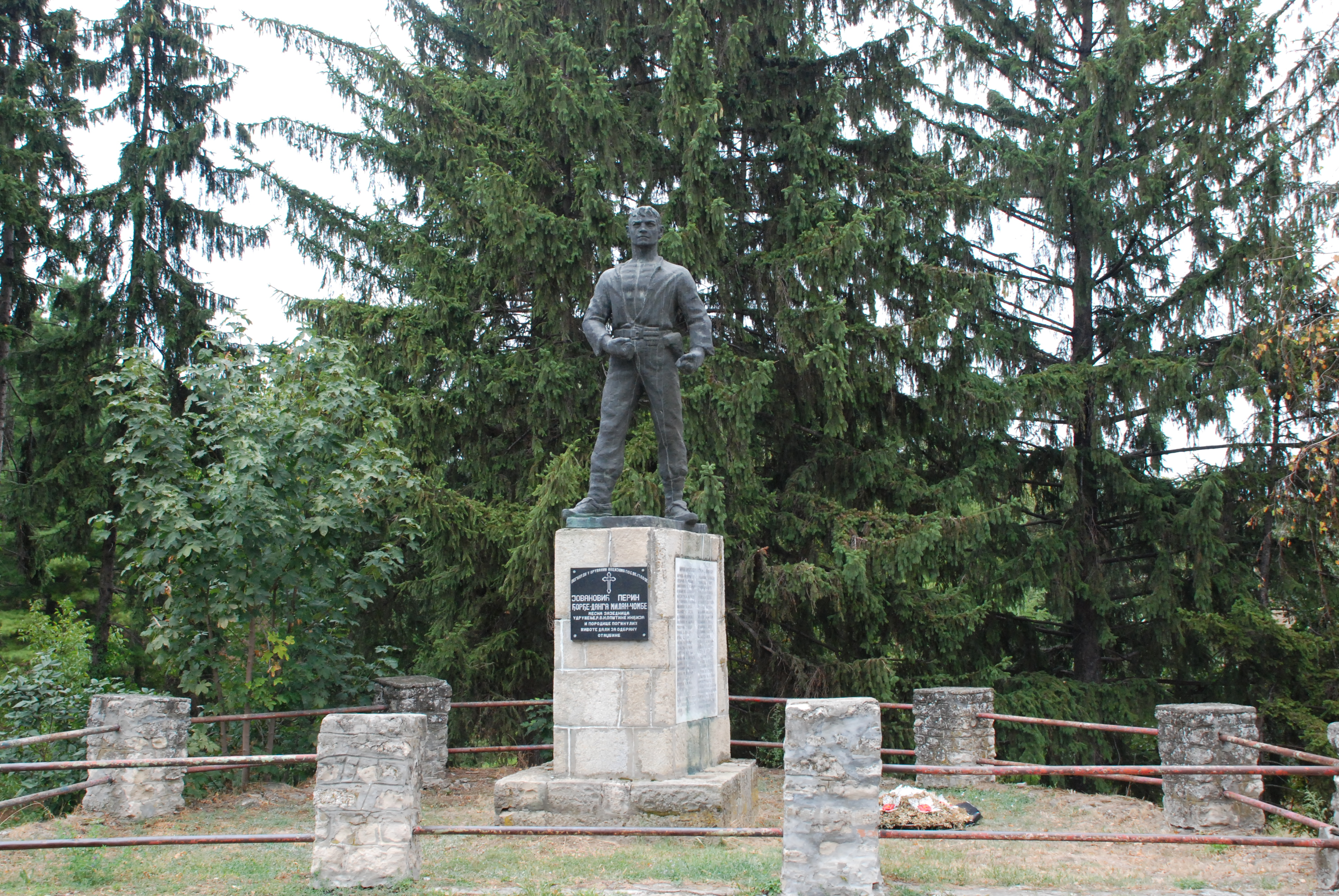

Čortanovci (Serbian Cyrillic: Чортановци) is a village located in the Inđija Municipality, in the Srem District of the Autonomous Province of Vojvodina, Serbia. It As of the 2022 census, the village has a population of 2,002 inhabitants.

Because of its pleasant climate and the neighboring Danube, it is mostly visited by citizens who have houses in that village. They usually spend their summer holidays there. The Serbian Orthodox Church of St. Nicholas is located in the village.

== Name ==
The name of the village in Serbian is plural.

== Demographics ==
Historical population
Year	Pop.	±% p.a.
1961	1,833	—
1971	1,651	−1.04%
1981	1,853	+1.16%
1991	1,590	−1.52%
2002	2,308	+3.45%
2011	2,337	+0.14%

As of 2011 census, the village of Čortanovci has a population of 2,337 inhabitants.

== See also ==
- List of places in Serbia
- List of cities, towns and villages in Vojvodina
