= Topola =

Coordinates: 44°15′N 20°42′E

Topola Топола (Serbian)
- Town and municipality
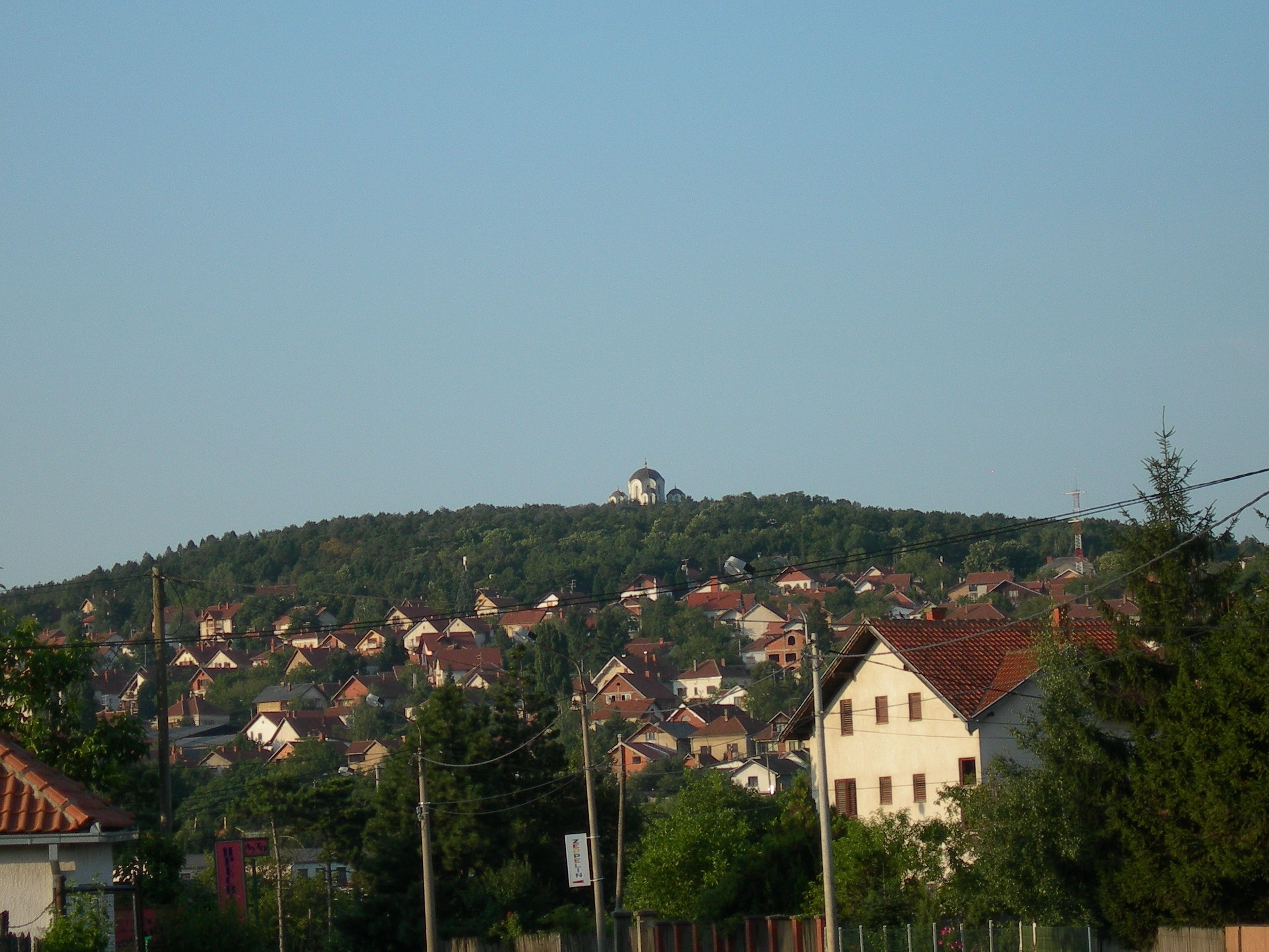
- Topola with Oplenac at its hilltop

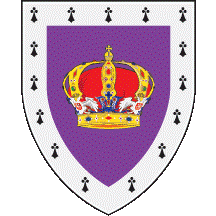
- Flag Coat of arms

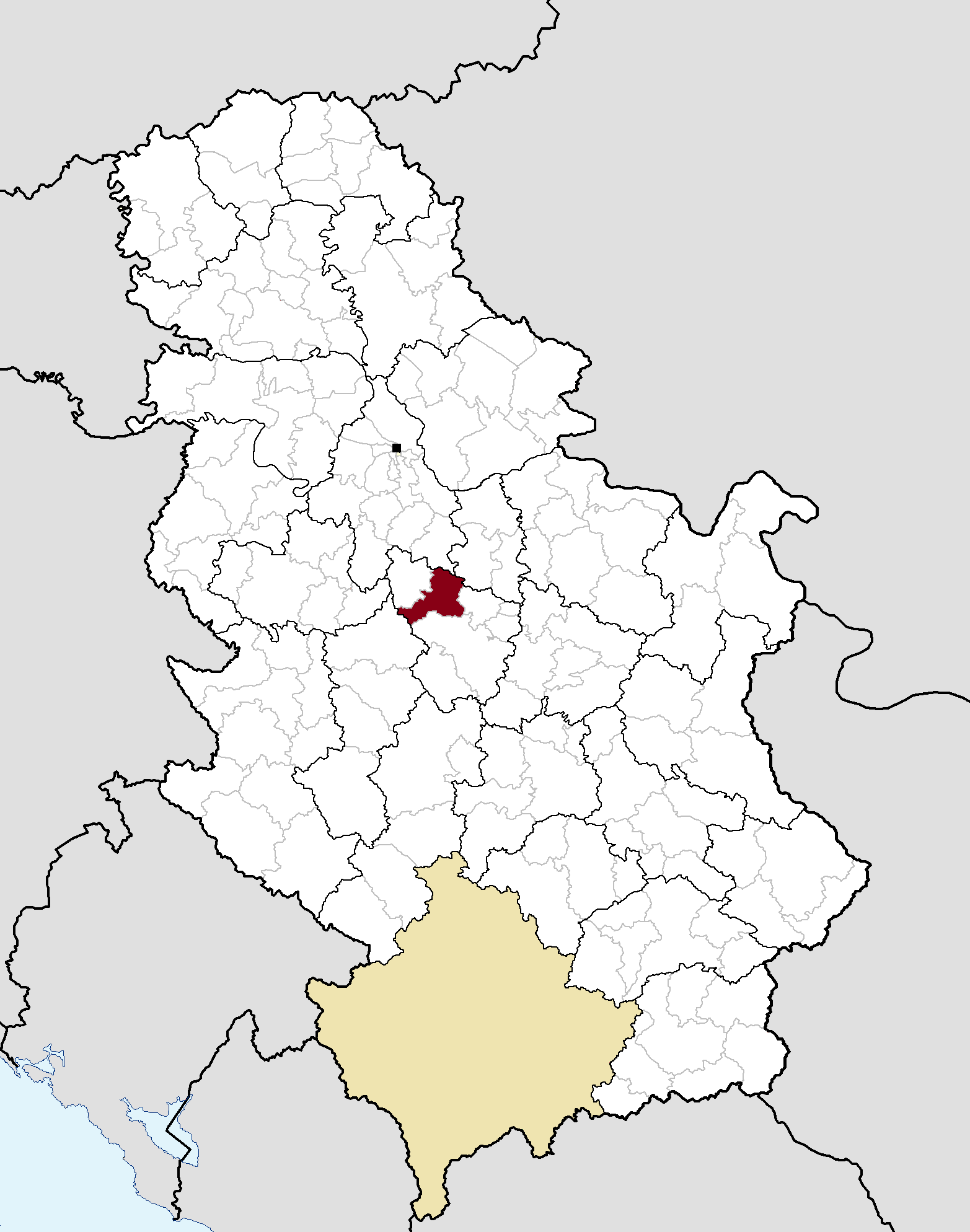
- Location of the municipality of Topola within Serbia
- Country: Serbia
- Region: Šumadija and Western Serbia
- District: Šumadija
- Settlements: 31

Government
  - Mayor: Vladimir Radojković (SNS)

Area
  - Town: 5.91 km^{2} (2.28 sq mi)
  - Municipality: 356 km^{2} (137 sq mi)
- Elevation: 272 m (892 ft)

Population (2022 census)
  - Town: 4,588
  - Town density: 776/km^{2} (2,010/sq mi)
  - Municipality: 19,134
  - Municipality density: 53.7/km^{2} (139/sq mi)
- Time zone: UTC+1 (CET)
  - Summer (DST): UTC+2 (CEST)
- Postal code: 34310
- Area code: +381(0)34
- Car plates: TO
- Website: www.topola.com

Topola (Serbian Cyrillic: Топола, pronounced [tɔpɔ̌la]) is a town and municipality located in the Šumadija District of central Serbia. It was the place where Karađorđe, a Serbian revolutionary, was chosen as the leader of the First Serbian Uprising against the Ottoman Empire in 1804. The local St. George Church is the burial place of the Ducal and Royal Family of Serbia and Yugoslavia (the Karađorđevićes).

The name Topola means poplar. Topola is famous for its yearly Oplenac vintage festival, attended by several thousand visitors each year.

== Settlements ==
Aside from the town of Topola (5,422), the municipality includes the following settlements, according to 2002 census (population in brackets):

- Belosavci (1017)
- Blaznava (591)
- Božurnja (672)
- Donja Šatornja (800)
- Donja Trešnjevica (304)
- Donja Trnava (921)
- Gornja Šatornja (558)
- Gornja Trnava (1736)
- Gorovič (319)
- Guriševci (153)
- Jarmenovci (563)
- Jelenac (375)
- Junkovac (945)
- Kloka (1146)
- Krćevac (775)
- Lipovac (558)
- Manojlovci (144)
- Maskar (236)
- Natalinci (834)
- Ovsište (630)
- Pavlovac (70)
- Plaskovac (559)
- Rajkovac (189)
- Šume (595)
- Svetlić (417)
- Topola (village) (1363)
- Vinča (1176)
- Vojkovci (278)
- Žabare (1016)
- Zagorica (765)

== History ==
The region was heavily settled after the Battle of Kosovo in 1389, seen in the many medieval cemeteries in villages of Topola. Despot Stefan Lazarević died and was buried in the nearby Crkvine hamlet. On 20 June 1459 the city of Rudnik fell to the Ottomans, situated south of Topola. A hamlet was named Despotovica in memory of the fallen Serbian Despotate. The region was further settled with the great migration of Serbs in the 17th century.

The town was established in 1781, by Vožd Karageorge, on the right of the Kamenica River. The town was destroyed during the First Serbian Uprising, when Kučuk-Alija ravaged the Šumadija region in 1804, also burning down Karageorge's house. The renovation began in 1805, when the town was renewed as a fortified city; Karageorge built a new mansion on the ruins of his previous house, and several buildings surrounding, they were all protected with palisades and peep holes, making Topola a strategic settlement. With the successful revolts, Topola gains a political importance. The Vožd further expanded the town, from 1808 to 1813 he built large walls, towers, konaks, a school, a church and many other buildings. Topola became the centre of Revolutionary Serbia, where Karageorge was seated.

In 1814, just when the city was finished, the Ottomans tackle the Uprising and Topola was seriously damaged, only ruins were left. Aleksandar Karađorđević, the son of Karageorge, renewed the city and settled people in a higher degree, streets were built with nicer buildings and shops. With the comeback of the House of Obrenović in 1858, Topola saw further development.

== Demographics ==
Historical population
Year	Pop.	±% p.a.
1948	31,918	—
1953	32,561	+0.40%
1961	31,860	−0.27%
1971	30,322	−0.49%
1981	29,418	−0.30%
1991	27,579	−0.64%
2002	25,292	−0.78%
2011	22,329	−1.37%

== Economy ==
Topola is an agricultural area and farmers are producing fruit, vegetables and breeding cattle.

The following table gives a preview of total number of registered people employed in legal entities per their core activity (as of 2018):

Activity	Total
Agriculture, forestry and fishing	84
Mining and quarrying	35
Manufacturing	809
Electricity, gas, steam and air conditioning supply	51
Water supply; sewerage, waste management and remediation activities	98
Construction	94
Wholesale and retail trade, repair of motor vehicles and motorcycles	664
Transportation and storage	174
Accommodation and food services	163
Information and communication	31
Financial and insurance activities	47
Real estate activities	2
Professional, scientific and technical activities	93
Administrative and support service activities	44
Public administration and defense; compulsory social security	223
Education	339
Human health and social work activities	142
Arts, entertainment and recreation	53
Other service activities	89
Individual agricultural workers	1,611
Total	4,849

== Tourism ==
Topola has the preconditions necessary for development of a tourism industry. Historical and cultural monuments (Cultural Heritage of Serbia) exist: revolutionary and royal (Torbica's town), ecclesiastical (St. George's church, Nikolje monasteries). It is a wine region (Oplenac), and a large hunting ground Kamenica.

=== Visitor attractions ===
- Oplenac, church and mausoleum of the Karađorđević (22 members), built 1910-2
- Nikolje Monastery, built in 1425 by Nikola Dorjenovic
- Karageorge's town, restored quarters of the 1810s revolutionary town
  - Karageorge's church (church of Our Blessed Lady)
- Peter's house, King Peter's estate
- King's villa, Karađorđević estate
- Queen's villa, Karađorđević estate
- Winegrower's house, former royal wine cellar, now gallery
- Oplenac Wine region
  - Aleksandrović wine cellar
- Kamenica Hunting ground, hunting region
- Oplenac Vintage (Oplenacka berba) annual folk festival second weekend of October

== Sports ==
Local football club Karađorđe has played in the 3rd tier of the Serbian football pyramid.

== Gallery ==
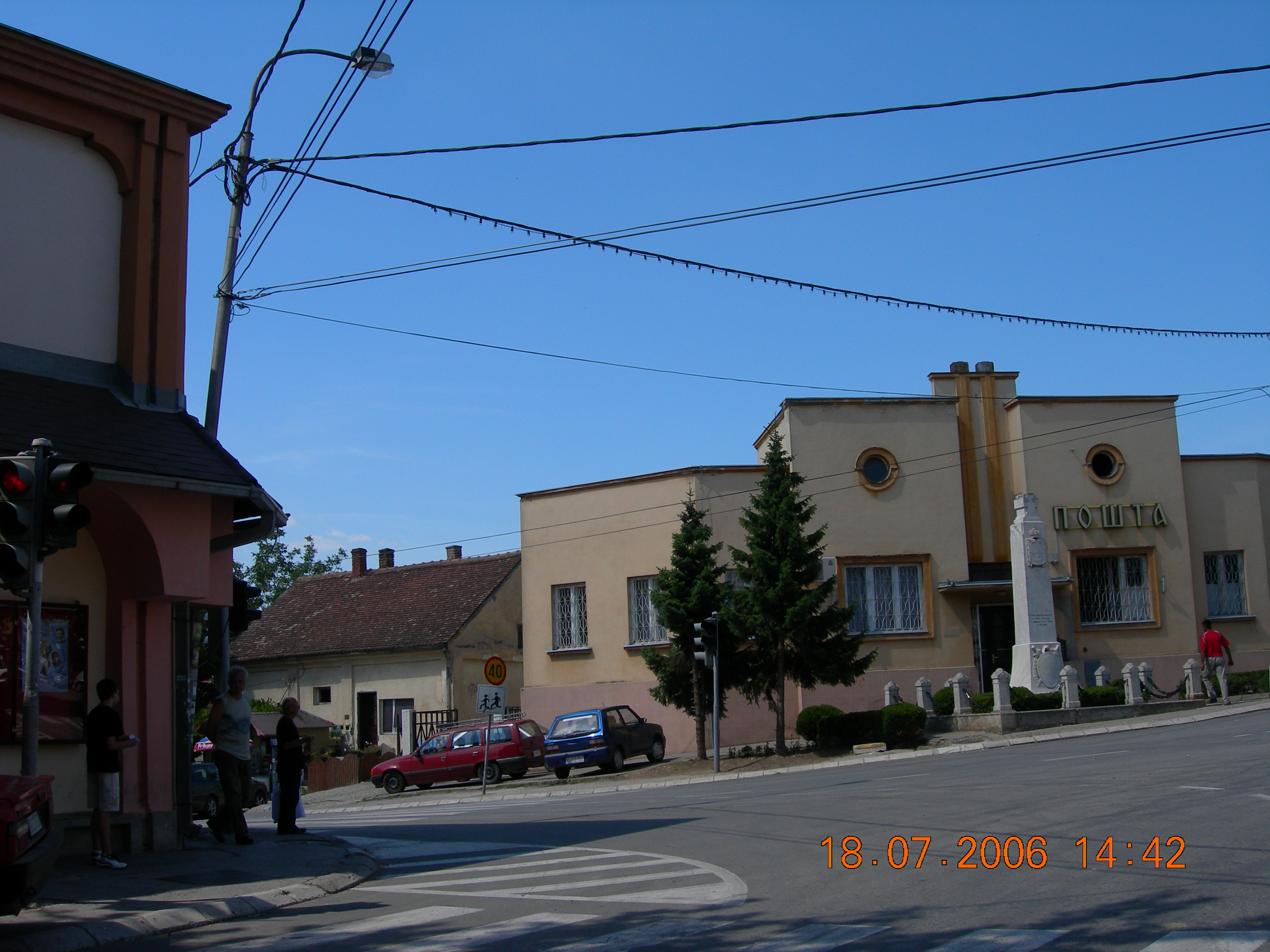
The historic Post office building

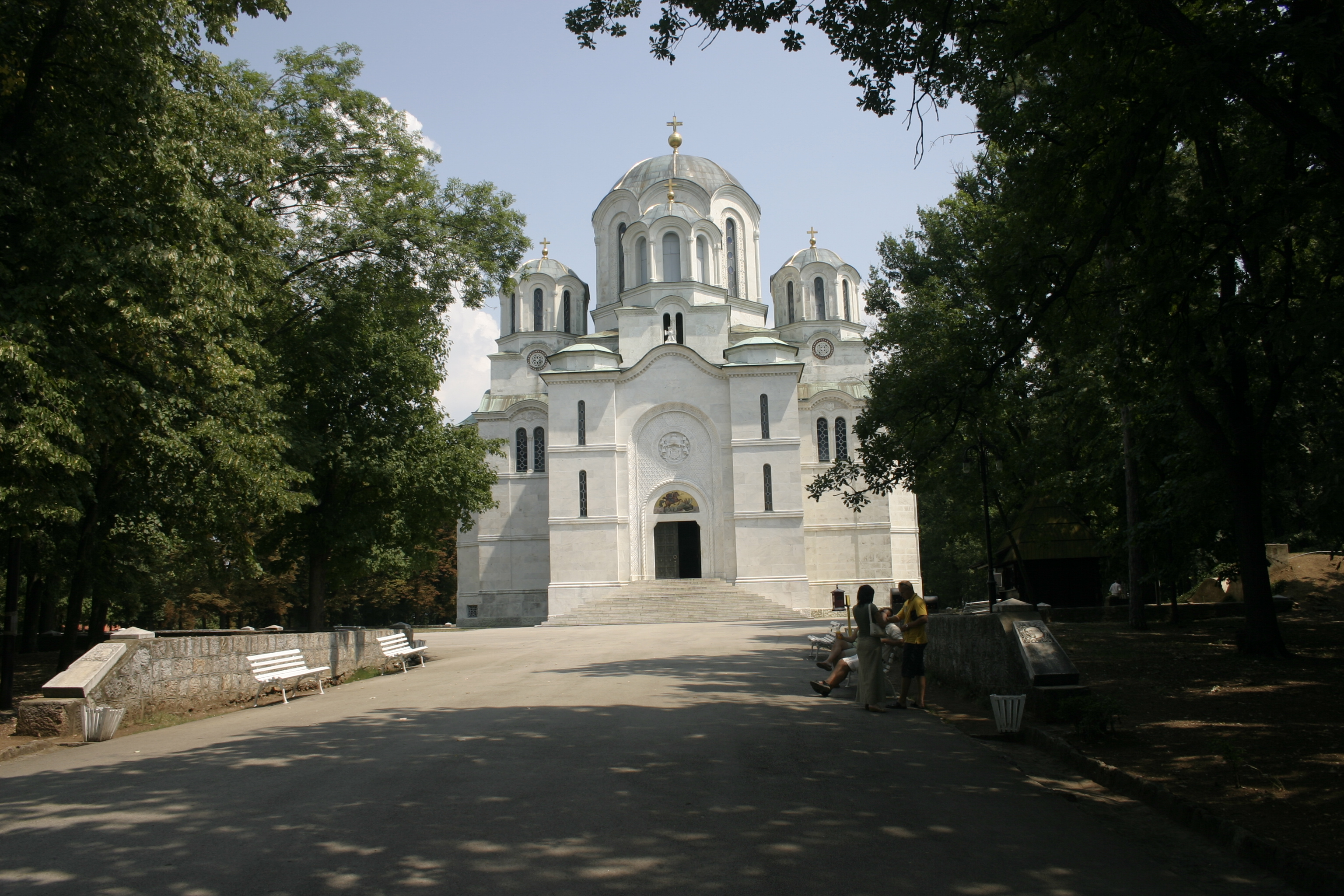
The Oplenac Royal Mausoleum
