= Zagorica, Serbia =

Zagorica
- Village
- Location within Serbia
- Coordinates: 44°18′30″N 20°44′11″E
- Country: Serbia
- District: Šumadija District
- Municipality: Topola
- Time zone: UTC+1 (CET)
  - Summer (DST): UTC+2 (CEST)

Zagorica is a village in the municipality of Topola, Serbia. According to the 2002 census, the village has a population of 765 people.
