= Venčac =

Mountain in Serbia

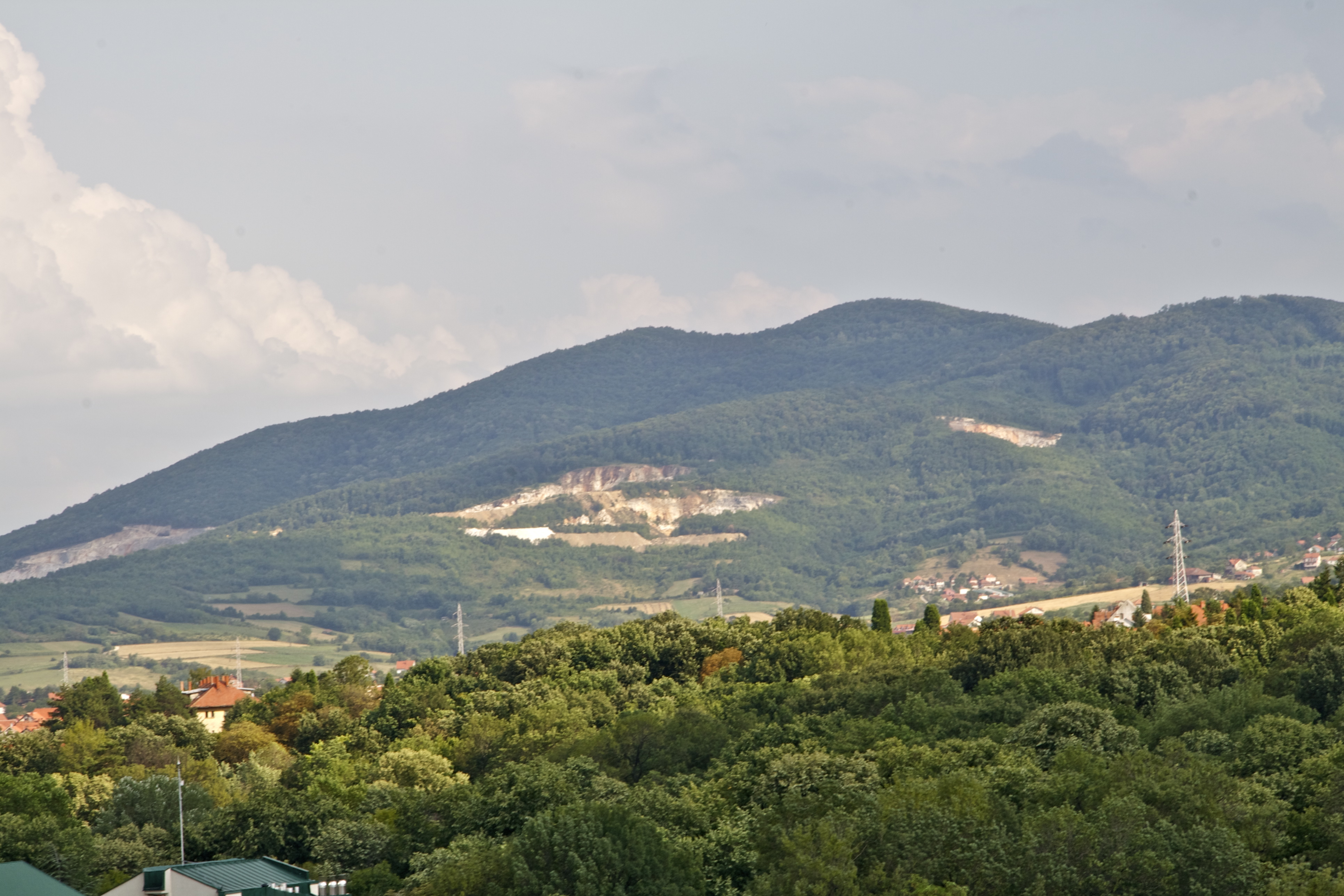

Highest point
- Elevation: 659 m (2,162 ft)
- Coordinates: 44°15′45″N 20°35′34″E

Geography
- Location within Serbia
- Location: Central Serbia
- Parent range: Dinaric Alps

Venčac (Serbian Cyrillic: Венчац) is a mountain in central Serbia, near the town of Aranđelovac. Its highest peak has an elevation of 659 meters above sea level. It is well known by its mine of white marble.

== See also ==
- List of mountains in Serbia
