= Kačer =

- Village
- Location within Serbia
- Coordinates: 43°49′N 19°45′E
- Country: Serbia
- Time zone: UTC+1 (CET)
  - Summer (DST): UTC+2 (CEST)

Kačer (Serbian Cyrillic: Качер) is a village located in the Užice municipality of Serbia. In the 2002 census, the village had a population of 507.
