= Rogot =

Protected area in Serbia

- IUCN category III (natural monument or feature)
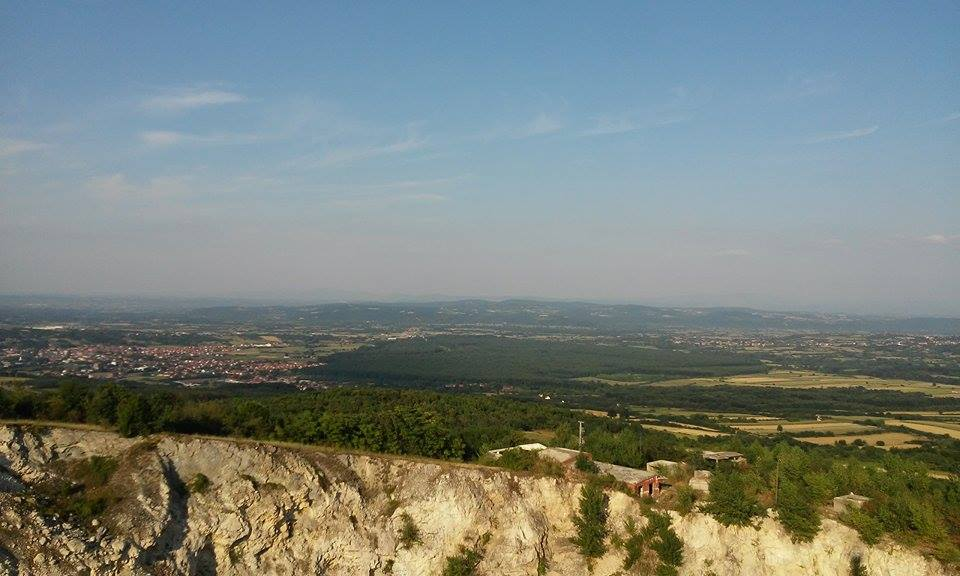
- Interactive map of Rogot
- Location: Šumadija District, Serbia
- Nearest city: Batocina
- Coordinates: 44°8′24″N 21°5′33″E
- Max. elevation: 111 m
- Min. elevation: 107 m
- Established: 1971
- Governing body: Institute for Nature Conservation of Serbia
- Operator: Kraljevo Forest Management
- Website: Link (in Serbian)

Rogot (Serbian: Рогот) is a protected forest and natural monument in the Šumadija District of central Serbia. It is administered by the municipality of Batočina, and spread across the villages of Batočina, Brzan, and Dobrovodica. Located in a valley between the Kijevski and Lepenca rivers, the forest covers a total of 291 hectares and is a popular destination for hunting and outdoor recreation.

Rogot is part of the greater Šumadija forest area, and is managed by the state-owned national forestry company Srbijašume.

== History ==
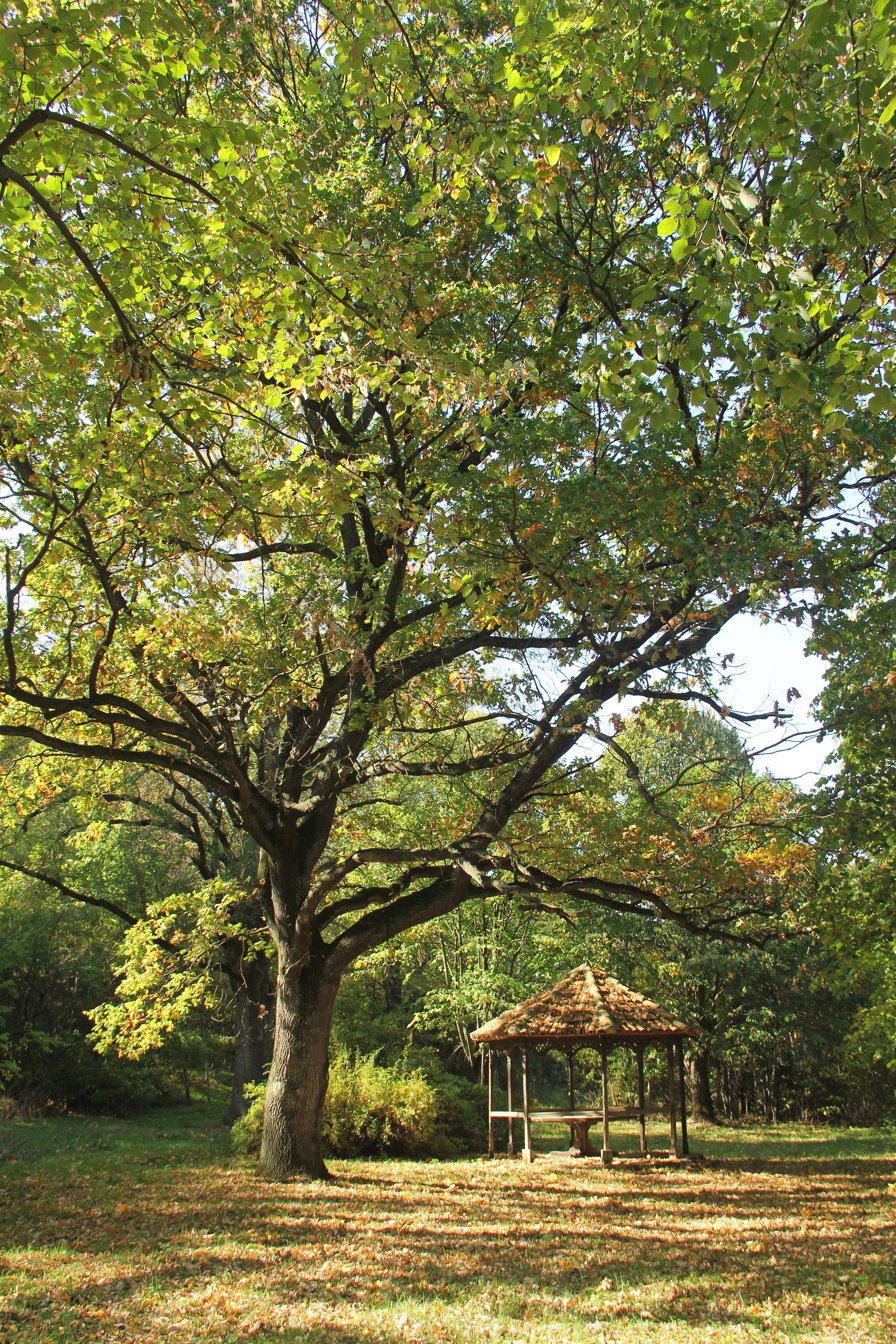
A gazebo under an oak in Rogot

In March 1804, Serbian revolutionary Đorđe Petrović defeated an army led by the renegade Ottoman janissary Kučuk Alija during the First Serbian Uprising in a pitched battle near Rogot. The young Serbian prince Miloš Obrenović would send his truffle pigs to graze in the forest, and the Obrenović family later used the area as a hunting ground. The forest was a popular location for truffle hunting.

Rogot is a remnant of the once-widespread oak forests that previously covered the southwestern portion of Great Morava Valley. Most of the area was deforested during World War I, and the current forest is largely the result of a series of reforestation efforts in the late 1930s. During this time, trees were planted using a method known as sowing "under the plow", in which acorns were planted into open furrows. The technique, commonly practiced on small plots of land in rural estates, was primarily done in Rogot with pedunculate oak (Quercus robur). For the reforestation of smaller outlying areas, ash (Fraxinus angustifolia), black locust (Robinia pseudoacacia), black pine (Pinus nigra), black walnut (Juglans nigra), and American ash (Fraxinus americana) seeds were also used.

=== Hunting ===
Legally sanctioned hunting within the forest preserve began on 13 October 1896 with the establishment of the Union of Hunting Associations (now the Hunting Federation of Serbia). At the time, the entire forest was privately owned by Milan Obrenović IV, the King of Serbia. In one of its first acts, the Union Administration requested hunting associations to send all reports of captured game to the union's representation. At the founding meeting, discussions were held about the necessity of a "Hunting Law" and how to facilitate its adoption by the National Assembly.

The Rogot Hunting Association was established in 1936. Since then, various mammals (wolf, red fox, marten, wildcat, hare) and birds (partridge, quail, eagle, hawk, buzzard) have been hunted in the area.

=== Recreational activities ===
Rogot has been used by various associations and organisations for outdoor recreation. The Šumadija Beekeeping Society has held several courses and events, including their annual beekeepers' assembly, in Rogot since 1933. Other activities organized in Rogot include motorcycle gatherings, dog shows, and children's cross-country races. It is also a popular excursion spot for schoolchildren.

== Location ==
Rogot is located 15 km northeast of the city of Kragujevac, and 3 km from Batočina, at the intersection of the Lapovo–Kragujevac railway line and the Belgrade–Niš Highway. The entrance to the forest is approximately 1 km from the highway, and 4 km from the banks of the Great Morava river. The forest complex is bordered by the villages of Lapovo, Brzan, Dobrovodica, Badnjevac, Prnjavor, Žirovnica, and Batočina, and is located at an altitude of roughly 110 metres above sea level.

== Protection ==
In 1971, a government resolution was passed enshrining Rogot's status as a protected national monument. An area of 339.14 hectares of pedunculate oak, a rare tree not commonly seen in Serbia, was placed under protection in order to preserve its habitat and the region's overall biodiversity, and to facilitate the forest's further development. Today, the natural monument covers an area of 290.95 hectares and lies within the administrative boundaries of the municipality of Batocina.

The protected area of the forest is under the IUCN category III protection regime, which allows the "selective and limited use of natural resources and controlled interventions and activities in the area, as long as they are in line with the functions of the protected natural asset or are related to traditional inherited forms of economic activities and living, including tourism construction". The management of the natural monument is entrusted to the public enterprise Srbijašume, which is administered by the Kragujevac Forest Estate.

Rogot has been subject to various forest restoration efforts, supported by artificial interventions such as acorn planting. The long-term goal of these measures is to regenerate areas of tree cover over a large scale, and to ensure the sustainability of the pedunculate oak forest. Civic associations such as hiking clubs or environmental organizations frequently participate in these restoration activities.

== Flora and fauna ==
The forest's botanical composition is predominantly deciduous, with a smaller percentage of coniferous trees. The majority of the Rogot's protected area is planted with pedunculate oak (Quercus robur), alongside smaller stands of Turkey oak (Quercus cerris), Scots pine (Pinus sylvestris) and black locust (Robinia pseudoacacia). Common accompanying species in the area include elm (Ulmus effusa), field elm (Ulmus minor), white poplar (Populus alba), ash (Fraxinus angustifolia), hornbeam (Carpinus betulus), European cranberrybush (Viburnum opulus), and dogwood (Cornus sanguinea).

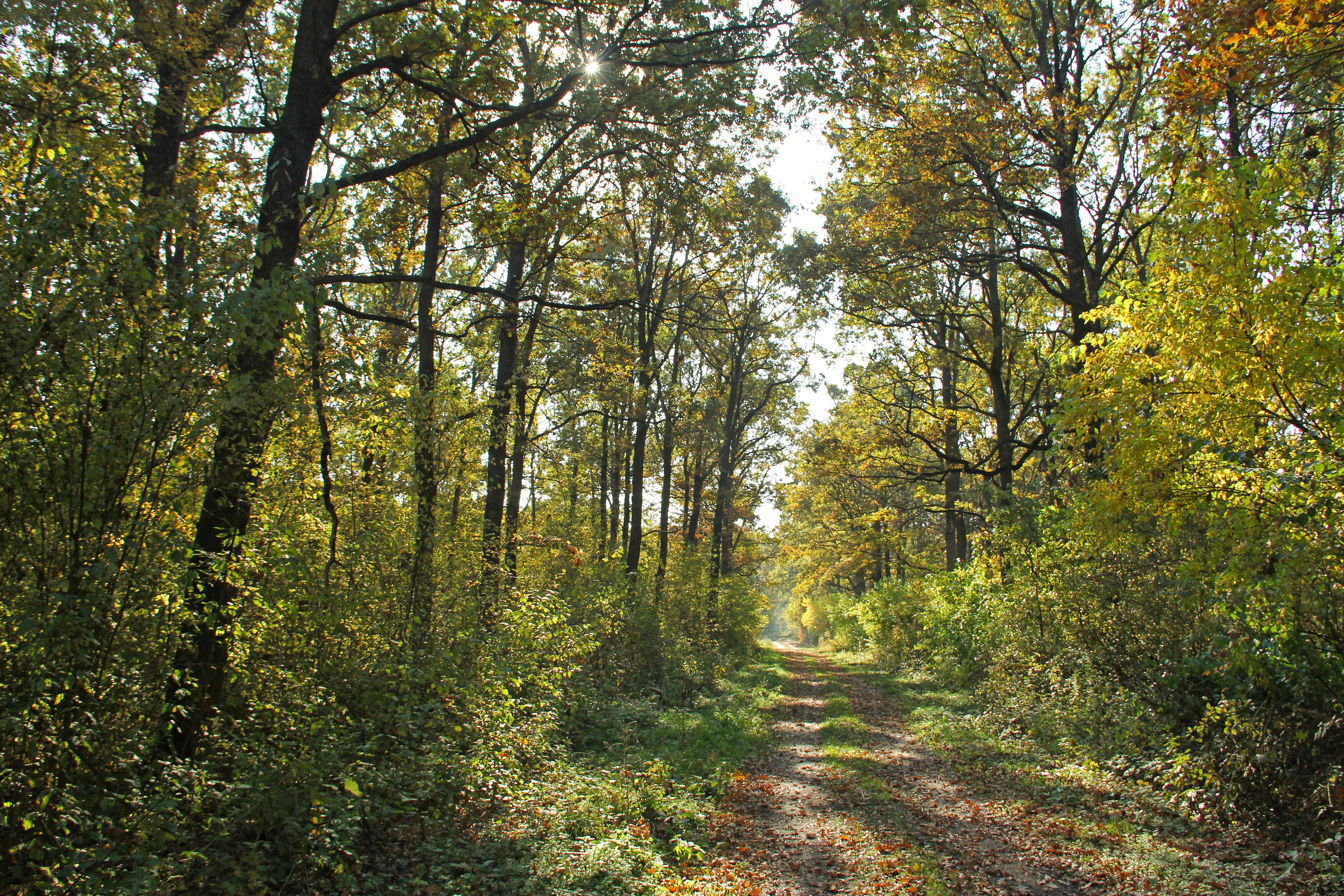

During the mid-20th century, Rogot was a nesting site for several rare and endangered bird species in Serbia, such as the imperial eagle (Aquila heliaca), lesser spotted eagle (Aquila pomarina), and Ural owl (Strix uralensis). Many of these species were ultimately driven out of the area due to urbanization of the surrounding regions and the accompanying destruction of natural habitats. However, the forest is still inhabited by some protected and threatened bird species, including the European honey buzzard (Pernis apivorus), black stork (Ciconia nigra), tawny owl (Strix aluco), and the middle spotted woodpecker (Dendrocopos medius).

=== Nursery ===
The Rogot nursery is directly operated by the Kragujevac Forest Estate. It is located at an altitude of 115 m, in an area of gently sloping terrain facing in a northwestern direction. The total area of the nursery is 7 hectares, of which 5 hectares is productive land. The nursery produces coniferous and deciduous seedlings.

== Tourism ==
The forest of Rogot features several amenities for tourists, including a hunting lodge and a parkground with benches, swings, and see-saws for children. Tourists can access the forest seedling nursery and a nearby pheasantry. Historical attractions include an old post office built in 1858, where the Hunting Association of Serbia was founded.

== Gallery ==
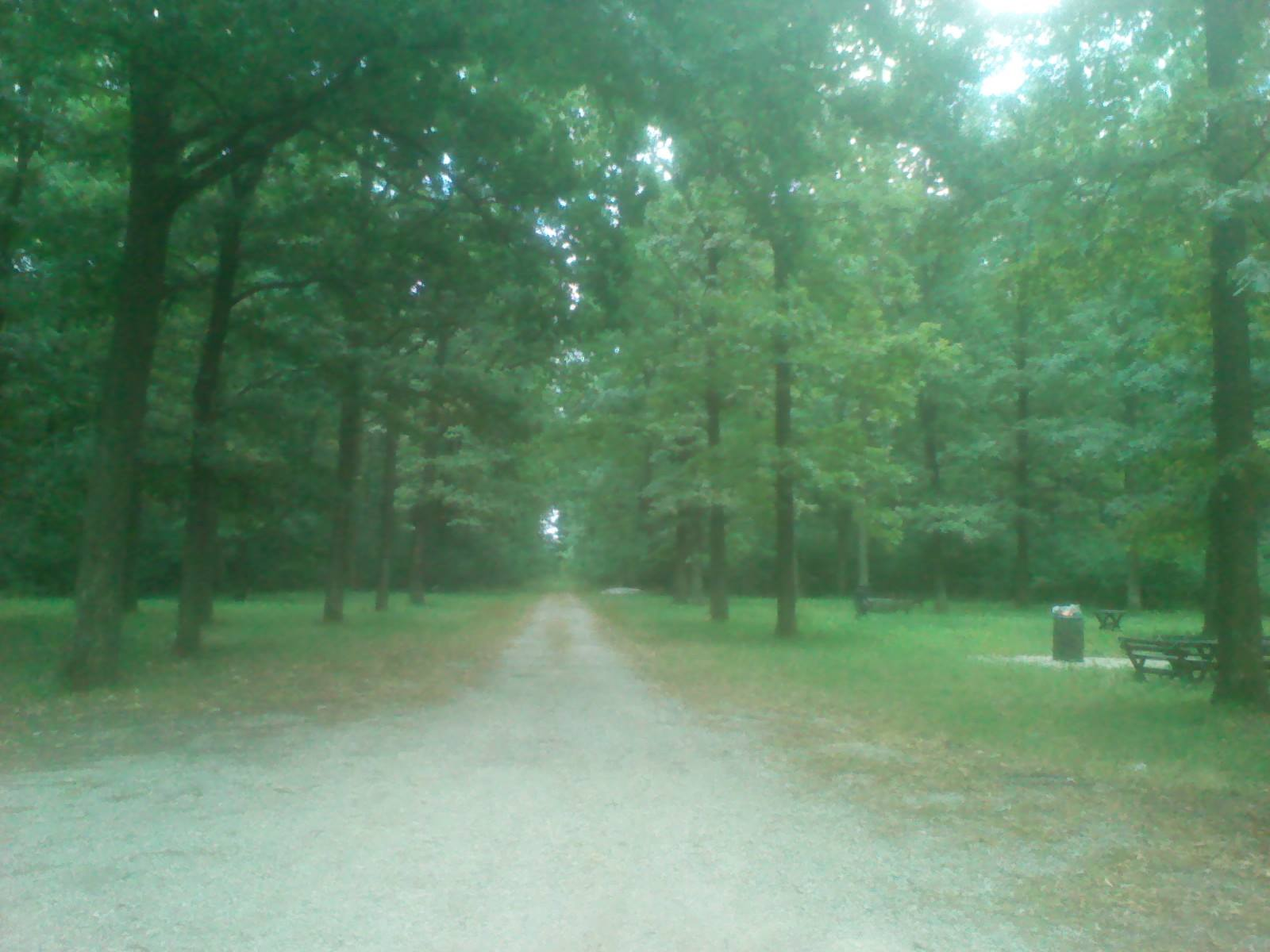
A park in Rogot

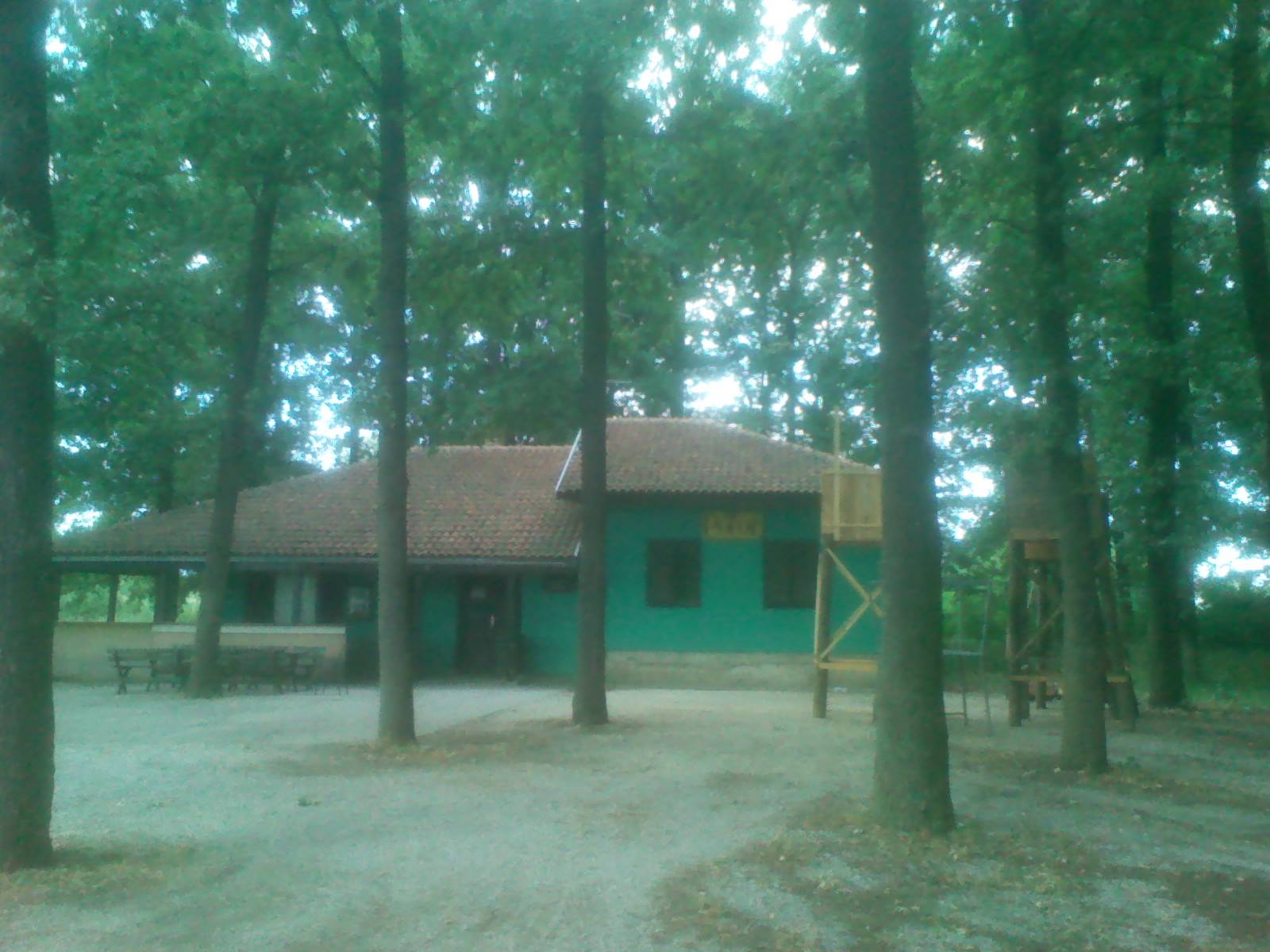
Rogot hunting lodge

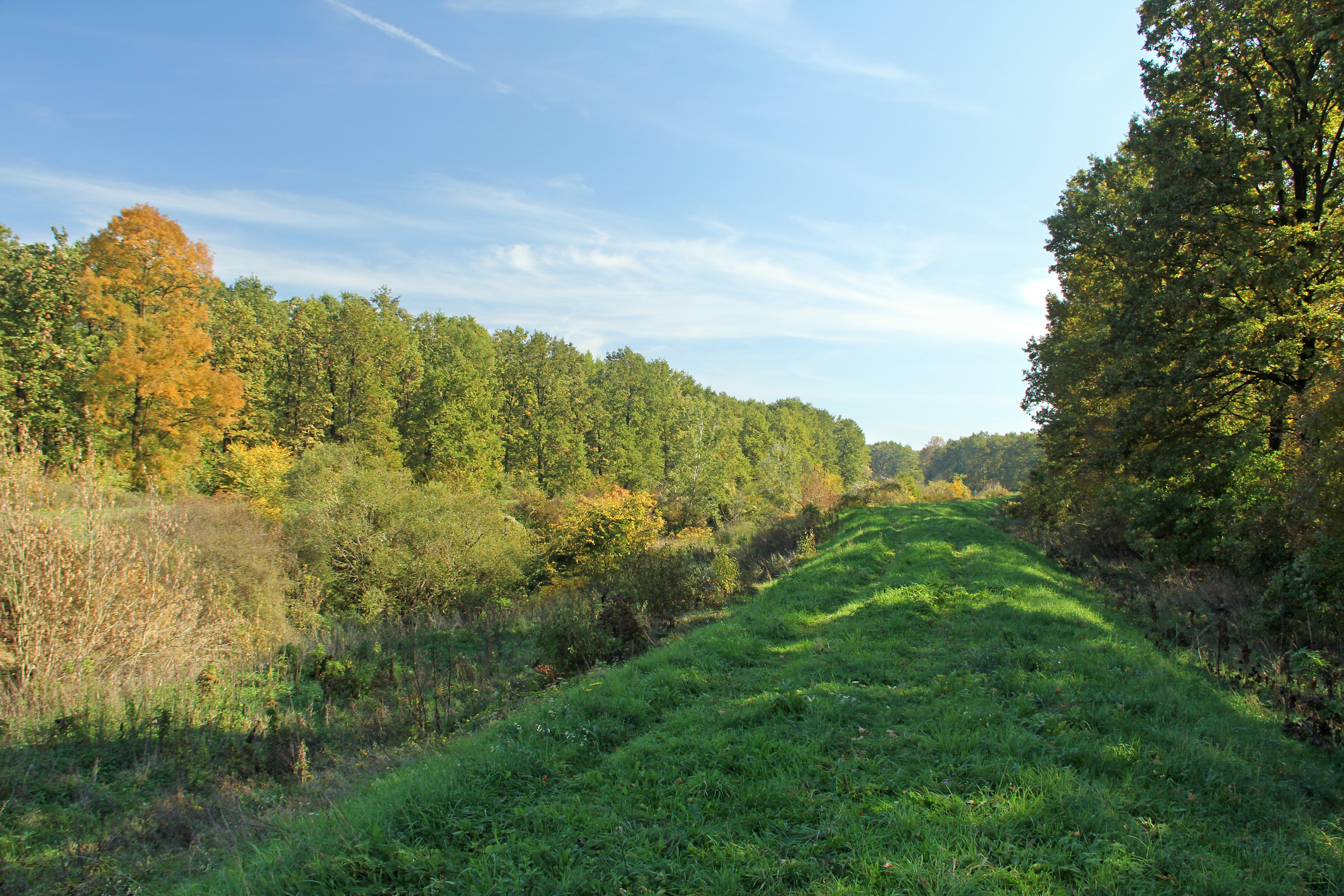
View of the forest in early autumn

== Sources ==
- Ostojić, Dragana; Jančić, Gordana; Krsteski, Biljana; Vukin, Marina (January–June 2021). "KОМПЕНЗАЦИЈСКE МЕРE КАО ПРИМЕР ОДРЖИВОГ РАЗВОЈА ЗАШТИЋЕНОГ ПРИРОДНОГ ПОДРУЧЈА – СПОМЕНИК ПРИРОДЕ "РОГОТ"" [COMPENSATORY MEASURES AS A MODEL FOR SUSTAINABLE DEVELOPMENT OF PROTECTED NATURAL AREAS – NATURAL MONUMENT "ROGOT"] (PDF). Оригинални научни рад (in Serbian). 1–2: 107–125.
