= Dimitrije Parezan =

Serbian leader

Dimitrije Parezan (Serbian: Димитрије Парезан; Brzan, c. 1780 – Deligrad, 1813) was one of the leaders in the First Serbian Uprising. He died in the Battle of Mozgovo in 1813.

== Biography ==
In the history of the First Serbian Uprising, Milan Milićević writes about Dimitrije Parezan: "Dimitrije Parezan was born in the village of Brzan in the Kragujevac nahija, and his ancestral home is in the village of Komadine in Stari Vlah .... Dimitrije was among the first to join Karađorđe in the fight against the Turks."

== Battle of Batočina ==
Dimitrije Parezan became famous in a battle near Batočina in 1804 when Batočina and its surroundings were liberated from the Turks. Occupying Kragujevac on 4 April (23 March according to the Old Calendar), Karađorđe arrived around noon on 4 April in front of Batočina and surrounded it. The Turkish units were composed of Arbanasi in the service of the Dahije. The leader Karadorde issued orders. Dimitrije and his people from Lepenice were on the other side of Rogot, towards Brzan. There he set up an ambush to wait for the Turks, regardless of whether they were fleeing from Batocina, or running to this place from Jagodina. The Serbs continued their onslaught until dark, but the Arbanassis did not give in. After besieging Batocina, Karadorde went to Levac to start an uprising in that part of Serbia as well. Kučuk Alija found out that Karađorđe had left, so he sent Tosun Aga with five hundred Turkish horsemen to break through to Batočina at night.

After taking up positions, a new insurgent attack began on 7 April (26 March by the Old Style calendar). The Turks and Arbanassi decided to retreat towards Jagodina, where they were to meet with Kučuk-Alija and continue further towards Belgrade. However, on the way to Jagodina, insurgents led by Dimitrije Parezan and Đuka Filipović were waiting for them in the Rogot forest, so the Turks decided to look for a way out towards Kijev through the Kijev stream.

Karadjordje waited for them to move as far away from Batocina as possible, so he followed them and caught up with them on Kijevački Potok between Kijevo and Dobrovodica. About four hundred Turks fell dead in that clash. Musein Ganić and Jusuf-aga Klimentić were also killed in the battle, while Tosun aga barely escaped and fled to Jagodina. In addition, the insurgents gained rich booty, including hundreds of rifles and nine standards.

== Voivode's wounds ==
In the spring of 1809, the leader sent a message to Parezan to gather up the people and go to Stari Vlach. Karađorđe led an army consisting of men from Smederevo, Kragujevac, Groč and partly the Rudnik, Požega and Užice districts. Dimitrije Parezan was especially fond of this invitation because he knew that his family was from Komadina and he was glad that the time had come for Komadina in Stari Vlach to be liberated and for him to command the Serbs in liberating the area where his family originated was an inestimable honour for him.

However, when he came near Ivanjica, a new order followed to head to Novi Pazar instead. They came to the Studenica monastery. There they stopped to pray, rest a bit, and then head to the river Ibar. They found little resistance from Turkish units. Though, a larger detachment of Turks was waiting for Dimitrije Parezan's unit in front of Novi Pazar where the real battle took place. The Turkish onslaught was heavy and the death toll in numbers for both sides was high. The Serbs were, however, able to stop the Turkish advance because Dimitrije ordered an assault and the people of Lepenica obeyed and set out immediately to meet the Turks. Heavy fighting ensued, and Dimitrije in the midst of close combat could not avoid being struck with an enemy sword. At the end of the day, the Turks were defeated, though Dimitrije was wounded.

== Battle of Mozgovo and death ==
Dimitrije Parezan went on to lead his people from Lepenice before the end of the First Serbian Uprising in an attempt to prevent the Turks from moving north. The Battle of Mozgovo took place on 16 August 1813. Duke Parezan was killed and his head was taken to Constantinople. His body parts were cut to pieces and scattered so that they could not be recognized or buried.

== See also ==
- List of Serbian Revolutionaries
