= Lepenica (region) =

Geographical subregion of Šumadija, Serbia

Coordinates: 44.2333°N 20.8°E

River Lepenica near Gradac village

Lepenica (Serbian: Лепеница) is a geographical subregion of Šumadija in central Serbia. The most notable settlements is Kragujevac.

== History ==
In the late Ottoman period, Lepenica was a knežina (Christian self-governing village groups) belonging to the Kragujevac nahiya.

During the First Serbian Uprising (1804–13), the Lepenica area was organized into a knežina (administrative unit) of Revolutionary Serbia, belonging to the Kragujevac nahija. The Kragujevac nahiya had included three or four knežina (Christian self-governing village groups) prior to 1804, the Lower Gruža, the Upper Gruža, Lepenica, and Jasenica; with the uprising, the Gruža knežina was organized as one.

The Lepenica men under the command of Đuka participated in the Battles of Batočina and Jagodina (March–April 1804). During the siege of Čačak (1815), Pavle Cukić crossed Krčmar in Lepenica on his way to the Požarevac nahija, rallying people.

Among the most notable participants in the Serbian Revolution that hailed from Lepenica or were active there are:

- Đuka (fl. 1804–), obor-knez of Lepenica, from Jagnjilo.
- Dimitrije Parezan (1780–1813), kapetan of Lepenica, from Brzan, fell at Deligrad.
- Stevan Filipović (fl. 1804–), secretary, from Jagnjilo.
- Pavle Cukić (1778–1817), vojvoda of Lepenica (–1812), from Krčmar.
- Miloš Saranovac, vojvoda of Lepenica (1812–).

== See also ==
- List of regions of Serbia

== Sources ==
- Andrejić, Živojin (1979). Rača i okolina: prilog za istoriju Lepenice. Svetlost.
- Đorđević, Tihomir R. (1921). "Кнежине у Србији за време прве владе Кнеза Милоша". Српски књижевни гласник, нова серија. 4: 508–518, 600–611.
- Jokić, Petar; Milićević, M. Đ. (1891) [1852]. "Imena Srba". Споменик. У Државној штампарији Краљевне Србије: 46–56.
- Nenadović, Konstantin N. (1903) [1883]. Живот и дела великог Ђорђа Петровића Кара-Ђорђа [Life and Deeds of Great Đorđe Petrović Kara-Đorđe]. Vol. I (2 ed.). Belgrade: Штампа Савића и Комп. – via Archive.org.
- Novaković, Stojan (1904). Устанак на дахије 1804. Штампано у Државној штампарији – via Archive.org.
- Popović, Radomir (2020), Гружа у Хаџи-Продановој буни [Gruža in Hadži-Prodan's rebellion] (PDF), Српски научни центар – центар за етнолошко-антрополошка и мултидисциплинарна истраживања Срба
