= Crni Kao =

Crni Kao may refer to:

- Crni Kao (Batočina), a village in Batočina, Serbia
- Crni Kao (Ražanj), a village in Ražanj, Serbia
