= Bukovik (eastern Serbia) =

Mountain in eastern Serbia

- Location within Serbia

Highest point
- Elevation: 894 m (2,933 ft)
- Coordinates: 43°41′30″N 21°38′08″E

Geography
- Location: Eastern Serbia

Bukovik (Serbian Cyrillic: Буковик) is a mountain in eastern Serbia, between the towns of Ražanj, Aleksinac and Sokobanja. Its highest peak Bukova glava (Букова глава) has an elevation of 894 m (2,933 ft) above sea level.

Bukovik is located between the left, eastern bank of the South Morava river and the right, northern bank of its tributary the Moravica, above the Bovan Lake reservoir. The municipal border between Aleksinac and Ražanj runs across the mountain. The easiest access is from the villages of Mozgovo to the south and Crni Kao to the west. The mountain is well-forested, originally with beech trees to which it owns its name (bukva (буква) meaning 'beech' in Serbo-Croatian), but after the World War II significant amounts of spruce have been planted. To the northeast lies the Rožanj mountain, separated by the valley of the Brška Reka, a tributary of the Bovan Lake.

Near the mountain top there are two separate World War II memorials, one to the Yugoslav Partisans and the other to the Chetniks, who fought a fierce battle in June 1944.
