= Borisav Jović =

Serbian politician (1928–2021)

- Борисав Јовић
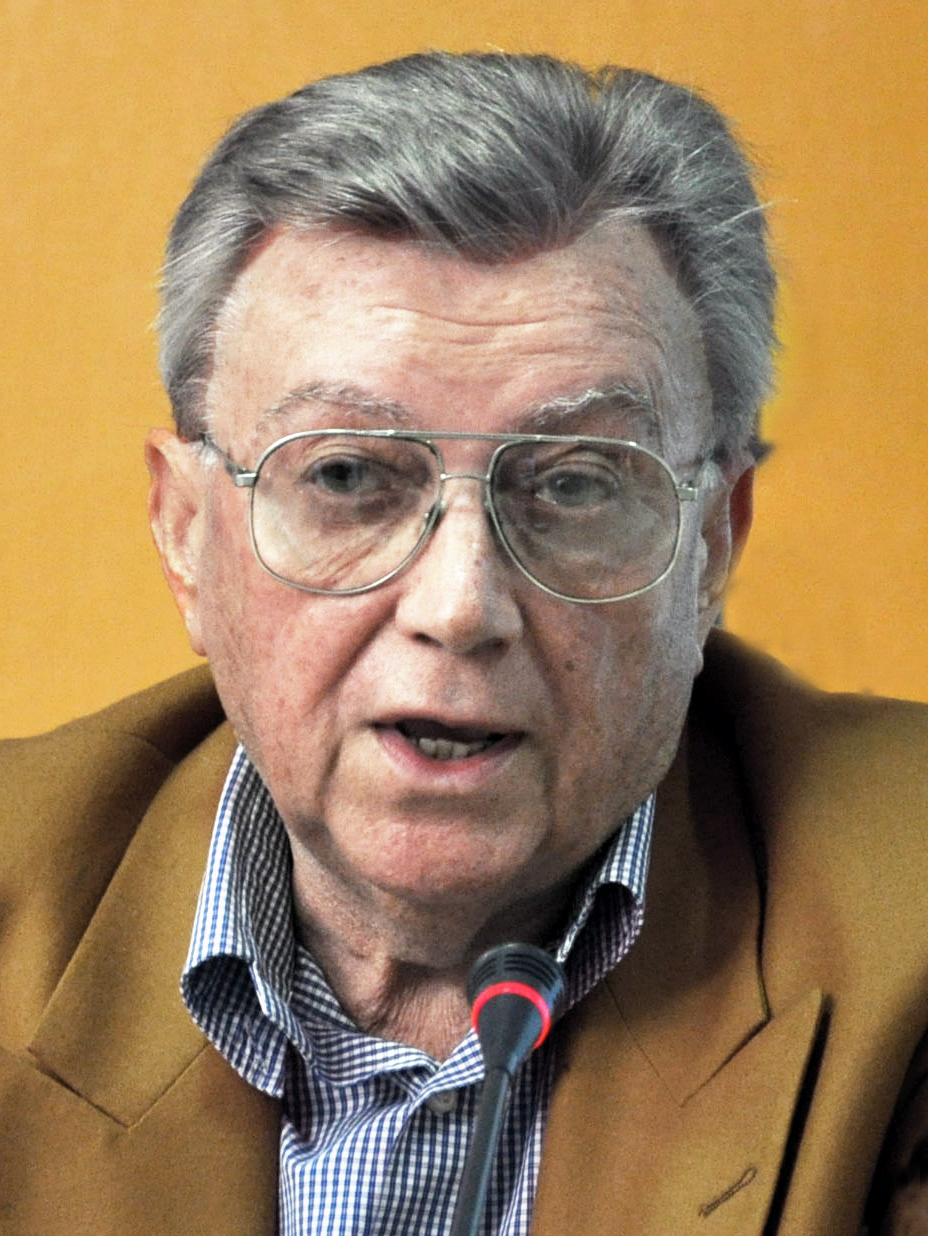
- Jović in 2009

12th President of the Presidency of Yugoslavia
- In office 15 May 1990 – 15 May 1991
- Prime Minister: Ante Marković
- Preceded by: Janez Drnovšek
- Succeeded by: Sejdo Bajramović (Acting)

12th Secretary General of Non-Aligned Movement
- In office 15 May 1990 – 15 May 1991
- Preceded by: Janez Drnovšek
- Succeeded by: Stjepan Mesić

3rd Serbian Representative in the Yugoslav Presidency
- In office 15 May 1989 – 27 April 1992
- Preceded by: Nikola Ljubičić
- Succeeded by: Office abolished

Personal details
- Born: 19 October 1928 Nikšić, Batočina, Kingdom of Serbs, Croats and Slovenes
- Died: 13 September 2021 (aged 92) Belgrade, Serbia
- Party: League of Communists of Yugoslavia; Socialist Party of Serbia

Borisav Jović (Serbian Cyrillic: Борисав Јовић, pronounced [jǒːʋit͡ɕ]; 19 October 1928 – 13 September 2021) was a Serbian economist, diplomat and politician who served as the President of the Presidency of Yugoslavia from 1990 to 1991.

He was Yugoslavia's ambassador to Italy from the mid to late 1970s, was the Serbian representative of the collective Presidency of Yugoslavia during the late 1980s and early 1990s, was the President of the Presidency and was a leading figure in the Socialist Party of Serbia in the 1990s, playing a key role during the Breakup of Yugoslavia and the Yugoslav Wars. Jović received his PhD in economics from the University of Belgrade in 1965. He was a fluent speaker of Russian and Italian.

== Career ==
Jović was a close ally and advisor of Serbian official Slobodan Milošević and helped Milošević attain power during the anti-bureaucratic revolution. He served as president of the Presidency of Yugoslavia from May 1990 to May 1991. In his book, Poslednji dani SFRJ (Belgrade, 1995), Jović describes how in late June 1990, following the electoral victory in Slovenia and Croatia of pro-independence forces, he proposed to Milošević and federal defense minister Veljko Kadijević that they "throw Slovenia and Croatia out of Yugoslavia" through the use of force, while retaining hold of Serb-populated sections of Croatia, to which Milošević agreed. Shortly after that meeting, Jović began implementing the strategy that led to the end of the federal Yugoslav state. Jović is known for helping to negotiate the Brioni Accord in early July 1991, which gave Slovenia its independence after the Ten-Day War.

Near the end of his mandate in the rotating presidency, his successor, Stjepan Mesić, a Croat, was blocked from taking the presidency by four out of eight members of the presidency who thus violated the constitutional arrangement for rotation. In mid-1991, with the tensions leading to the Croatian War of Independence rising in Croatia, Jović attempted to enact emergency powers which would effectively enable the Yugoslav People's Army to take control of the country and reverse the effects of the first free democratic elections, which had elected independence-advocating governments in the republics of Croatia and Slovenia. A vote of 5 out of 8 members of the Presidency was required, and Serbia had under its political control votes of Serbia, Montenegro, Vojvodina and Kosovo, and presumed that the Serb delegate representing Bosnia and Herzegovina would vote for the plan. The plan backfired when the Bosnian Serb delegate, Bogić Bogićević, refused to vote for the plan.

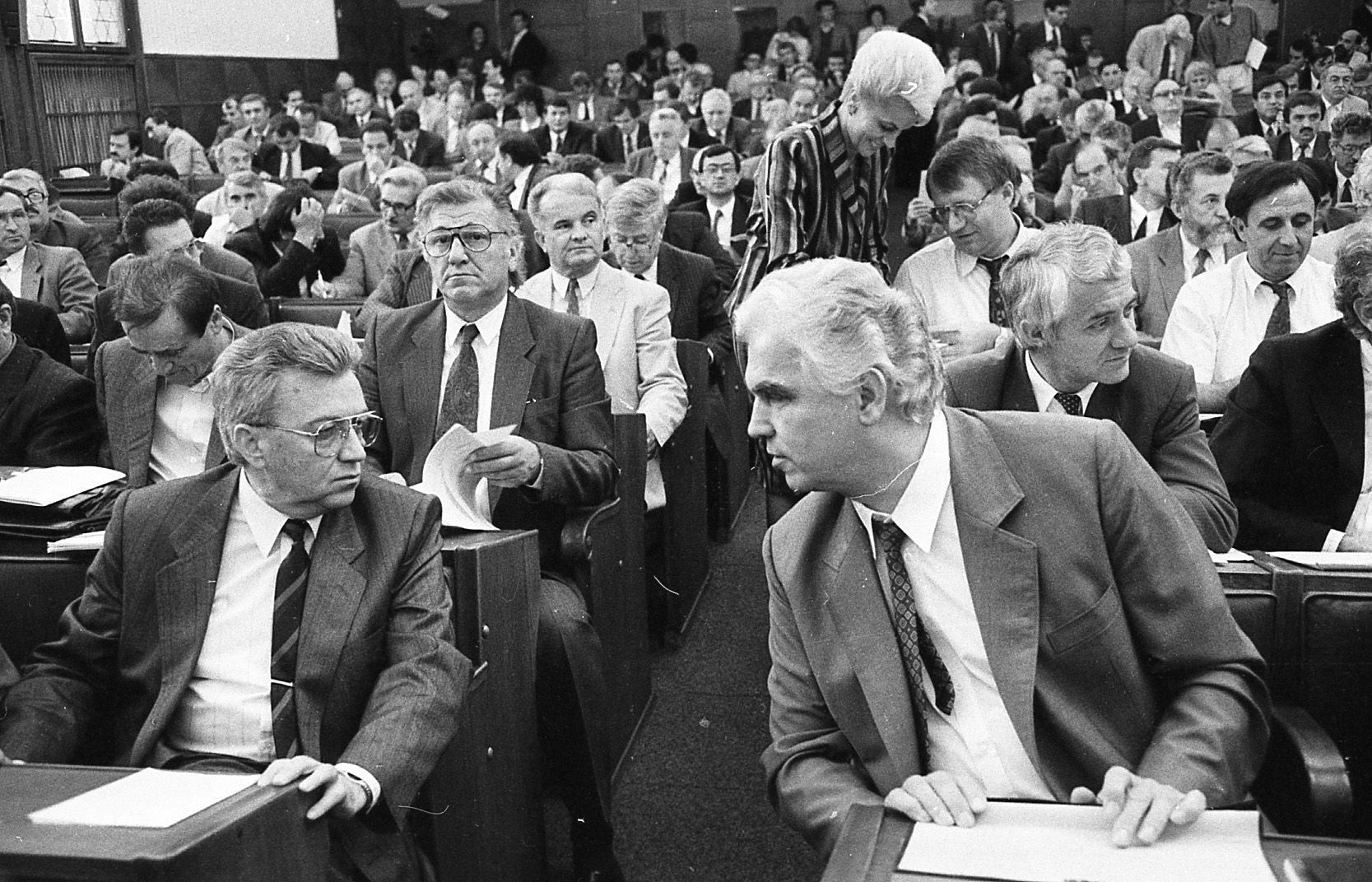
Jović (sitting left) in the Serbian National Assembly in the 1990s

In the 1995 BBC documentary The Death of Yugoslavia, Jović described to interviewers his perception of the events that took place that eventually resulted in the breakup of the Socialist Federal Republic of Yugoslavia and the subsequent Yugoslav Wars. During this interview (Part 4, "The Gates of Hell–"), as well as in his testimony before the ICTY, Jović described the actions of the Yugoslav leadership that led up to the formation of the Bosnian Serb Army. Jović claimed these actions were decided in a private discussion he held with Serbian President Milošević. According to Jović, he realized that if Bosnia and Herzegovina ended up being recognized by the international community, the presence of the Yugoslav People's Army (JNA) troops on Bosnian territory could have led to the Yugoslav government being accused of aggression. To avoid this, he and Milošević decided to move all JNA soldiers from Serbia and Montenegro and Bosnia and Herzegovina to their countries of origin, with the Yugoslav government covering the cost. In this way, every Bosnian Serb was transferred from the Yugoslav army to what became the newly created Bosnian Serb Army.

Jović viewed the reformist former Yugoslav Prime Minister Ante Marković, a Bosnian Croat, as responsible for destroying the country and for being a puppet of the capitalist West. Jović, while President of the Presidency of Yugoslavia, commented:

The general conclusion is that Ante Marković is no longer acceptable or reliable to us. No one has any doubts in their mind any longer that he's the extended arm of the United States in terms of overthrowing anyone who ever thinks of socialism, and it is through our votes that we appointed him Prime Minister in the Assembly. He is playing the most dangerous game of treason.

Jović's conclusion on Marković's role:

He was no doubt the most active creator of the destruction of our economy, and to a large extent a significant participant in the break-up of Yugoslavia. Others, who boasted of having broken up Yugoslavia, wanted to take this infamous role upon themselves, but in all these respects, they never came close to what Marković did, who had declared himself as the protagonist of Yugoslavia's survival.

After the war, Jović was interviewed as a suspect by the International Criminal Tribunal for the former Yugoslavia but was not indicted, with the prosecutorial team deciding to focus on preparing cases against major figures like Milošević. Jović was instead called as a witness and gave testimony on Milošević's activities during the war.

== Death ==
Jović died from COVID-19 on 13 September 2021, at the age of 92, during the COVID-19 pandemic in Serbia.

Political offices
Preceded by Janez Drnovšek	President of the Presidency of Yugoslavia; 1990–1991	Succeeded by Stjepan Mesić
Diplomatic posts
Preceded by Janez Drnovšek	Secretary General of Non-Aligned Movement; 1990–1991	Succeeded by Stjepan Mesić
