= Milatovac =

Milatovac may refer to:

- Milatovac (Batočina), a village in Serbia
- Milatovac (Žagubica), a village in Serbia
