= Kijevo, Batočina =

Kijevo Кијево
- Village (Selo)
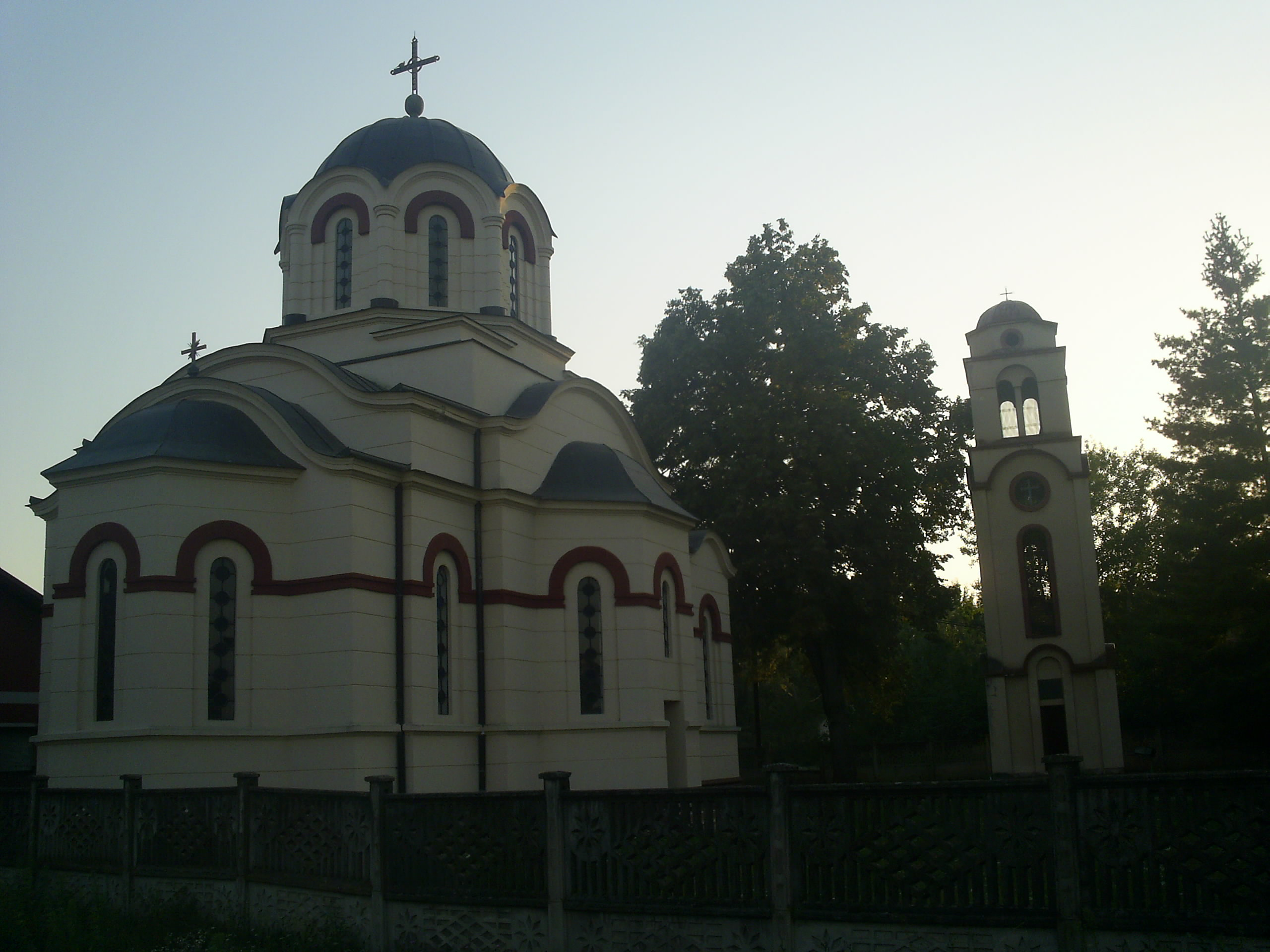
- Church in Kijevo

- Location within Serbia
- Coordinates: 44°05′N 21°04′E
- Country: Serbia
- District: Šumadija
- Municipality: Batočina

Population (2011)
  - Total: ▼482
- Time zone: UTC+1 (CET)
  - Summer (DST): UTC+2 (CEST)

Kijevo (Serbian: Кијево) is a village in the municipality of Batočina, Serbia. According to the 2011 census, the village has a population of 482 people.
