= Žirovnica, Batočina =

Žirovnica Жировница
- Village (Selo)
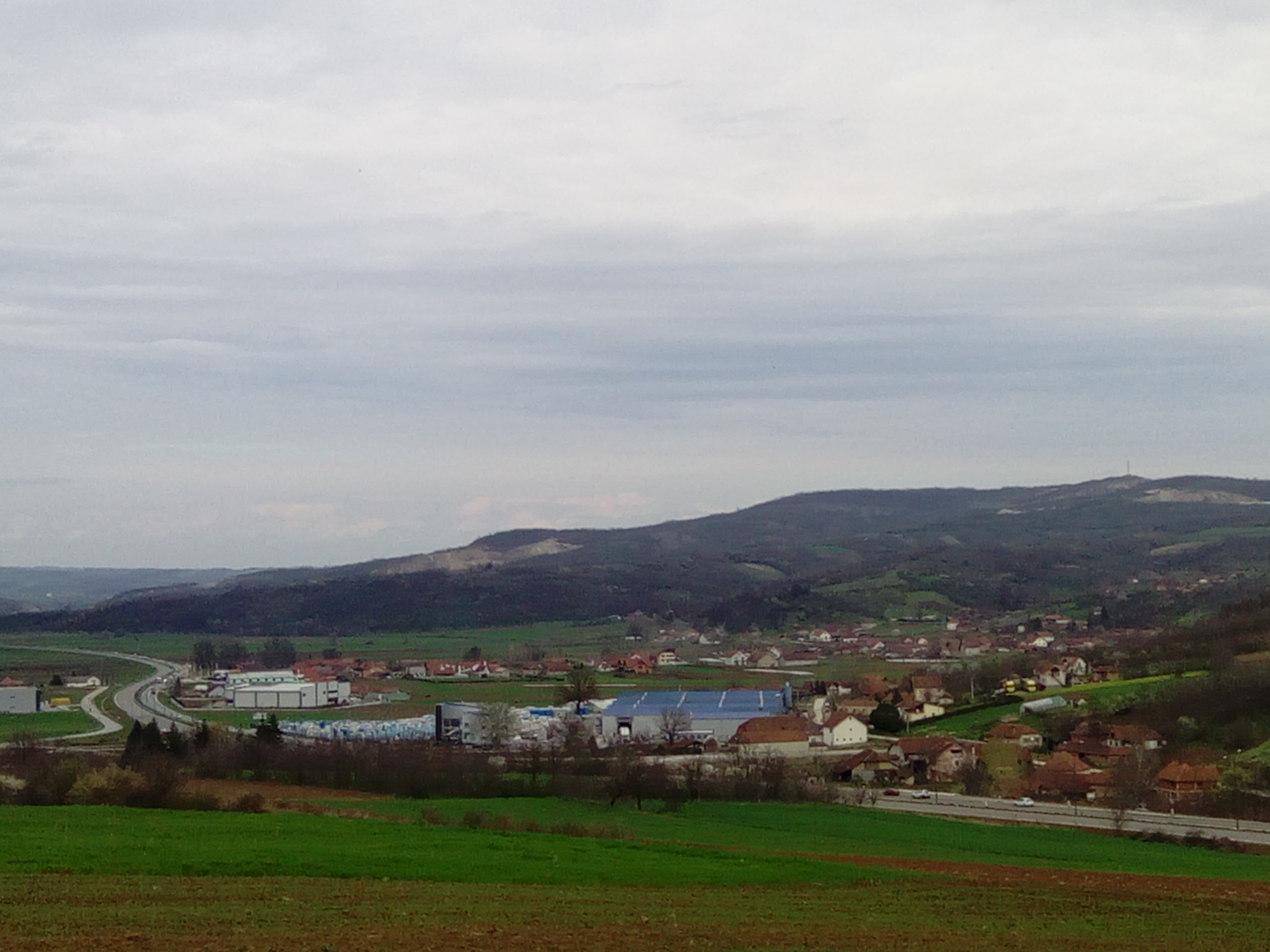

- Location within Serbia
- Coordinates: 44°07′01″N 21°01′48″E
- Country: Serbia
- Region: Šumadija and Western Serbia
- District: Šumadija
- Municipality: Batočina
- Elevation: 692 ft (211 m)

Population (2011)
  - Total: 742
- Time zone: UTC+1 (CET)
  - Summer (DST): UTC+2 (CEST)

Žirovnica (Serbian Cyrillic: Жировница) is a village in the municipality of Batočina, Serbia. According to the 2011 census, the village has a population of 742 inhabitants.

== Population ==
Population of Žirovnica
1948	1953	1961	1971	1981	1991	2002	2011
1216	1216	1188	1055	1078	974	830	742
