= Pavle Cukić =

Serbian revolutionary

Pavle Cukić (Serbian: Павле Цукић; 1778–1817) was a Serb revolutionary, a vojvoda (general) in the First Serbian Uprising and Second Serbian Uprising.

Cukić was born in the village of Krčmar, part of the Lepenica knežina in the Kragujevac nahiya. He became the vojvoda of Lepenica during the first uprising. In 1812, by the decision of the Serbian Governing Council, Cukić was stripped of his vojvoda title, due to abuse of power. He decided to flee, and an arrest warrant was issued along with a death sentence. After he voluntarily surrendered, he received a pardon, but no sooner he got into a disagreement with the newly appointed vojvoda of Lepenica, Miloš Saranovac.

After a misunderstanding that led to rebellion against Prince Miloš, vojvoda Pavle Cukić was killed in Rogača near Sopot, where he was buried. Miloš's wrath had no bounds he dealt ruthlessly with disobedient subordinates and executed the most famous revolutionary no matter who they were, including Karađorđe, Petar Nikolajević Moler, Sima Marković, bishop Melentije Simeonović Nikšić of Šabac. There were many revolts directed against Miloš's autocratic rule.

Pavle Cukić was married twice, having two wives at the same time; one who was in exile in Austrian Srem and the other in the Serbian hinterland. Later, both wives lived in his house together even after his death. From his first marriage, he had a daughter, Persida, whose grandson is Radoje Domanović, a writer. Pavle Cukić had no sons from his legal wives, but had an adopted son, Petar Lazarević-Cukić. Petar Lazarević-Cukić married Ana, the daughter of vojvoda Petar Moler, and they had a son, Kosta Cukić, the Minister of Finance. The widow of Cukić, married secondly to captain Stevan Piroćanac, had a son, Milan Piroćanac, a statesman, the president of the 31st government of Serbia.

The tombstone of Pavle Cukić was designated a cultural monument in 1987 (SK 229, CR 808), while it was completely renovated in 2006.

== See also ==
- List of Serbian Revolutionaries

== Sources ==
- Batalaka, Lazar Arsenijević (1898). Историја српског устанка, део први [History of the Serbian Uprising: Part One]. Vol. I. Izd. Batalakinoga fonda – via Google Books.
- Batalaka, Lazar Arsenijević (1899). Историја српског устанка, део други [History of the Serbian Uprising: Part Two]. Vol. II. Штампано у штампарији – via Google Books.
- Milićević, Milan Đ. (1888). Поменик знаменитих људи у српског народа новијега доба [Memory Book]. Издање Чупићеве задужбине – via Archive.org.
- Nenadović, Konstantin N. (1884). Живот и дела великог Ђорђа Петровића Кара-Ђорђа [Life and Deeds of Great Đorđe Petrović Kara-Đorđe]. Vol. II (1 ed.). Vienna: У Штампарији Јована Н. Вернаја – via Google Books.
- Nenadović, Konstantin N. (1903) [1883]. Живот и дела великог Ђорђа Петровића Кара-Ђорђа [Life and Deeds of Great Đorđe Petrović Kara-Đorđe]. Vol. I (2 ed.). Belgrade: Штампа Савића и Комп. – via Archive.org.
- Наша прошлост, Архив, 2006
