= Rožanj (Ražanj) =

Mountain in Serbia

- Location within Serbia

Highest point
- Elevation: 897 m (2,943 ft)
- Coordinates: 43°43′02″N 21°41′37″E

Geography
- Location: Eastern Serbia
- Parent range: Dinaric Alps

Rožanj (Serbian Cyrillic: Рожањ) is a mountain in eastern Serbia, near the town of Ražanj. Its highest peak, Veliki vrh, has an elevation of 897 meters above sea level. It is practically merged with Bukovik mountain, and they are separated only by the Baraka Pass (603 m). Lake Bovan is located on the southern foothills of the mountain.

== See also ==
- List of mountains in Serbia
