= Đorđe Petrović =

Đorđe Petrović may refer to:

- Karađorđe (1762–1817), Serbian revolutionary
- Đorđe Petrović (footballer) (born 1999), Serbian footballer
