= Srbijašume =

Serbian National Forestry Company

- Official logo of Srbijašume
- Native name: Србијашуме
- Company type: d.o.o.
- Industry: Wood
- Founded: 29 July 1991; 34 years ago
- Headquarters: Bulevar Mihajla Pupina 113, Belgrade, Serbia
- Area served: Serbia
- Key people: Igor Braunović (Director)
- Revenue: ▲€68.83 million (2018)
- Net income: ▲€7.26 million (2018)
- Total assets: ▲€1.151 billion (2018)
- Total equity: ▲€1.111 billion (2018)
- Number of employees: 3,168 (2018)
- Website: www.srbijasume.rs
- Footnotes / references Business ID: 07754183; Tax ID: 100002820

Srbijašume (Serbian Cyrillic: Србијашуме) is a state owned national forestry company based in Belgrade, Serbia. As of 2018, Serbia has a total of 978,283 hectares of land under forests owned by agricultural farms.

== See also ==
- Agriculture in Serbia
