= Milatovac (Batočina) =

Milatovac Милатовац
- Village (Selo)
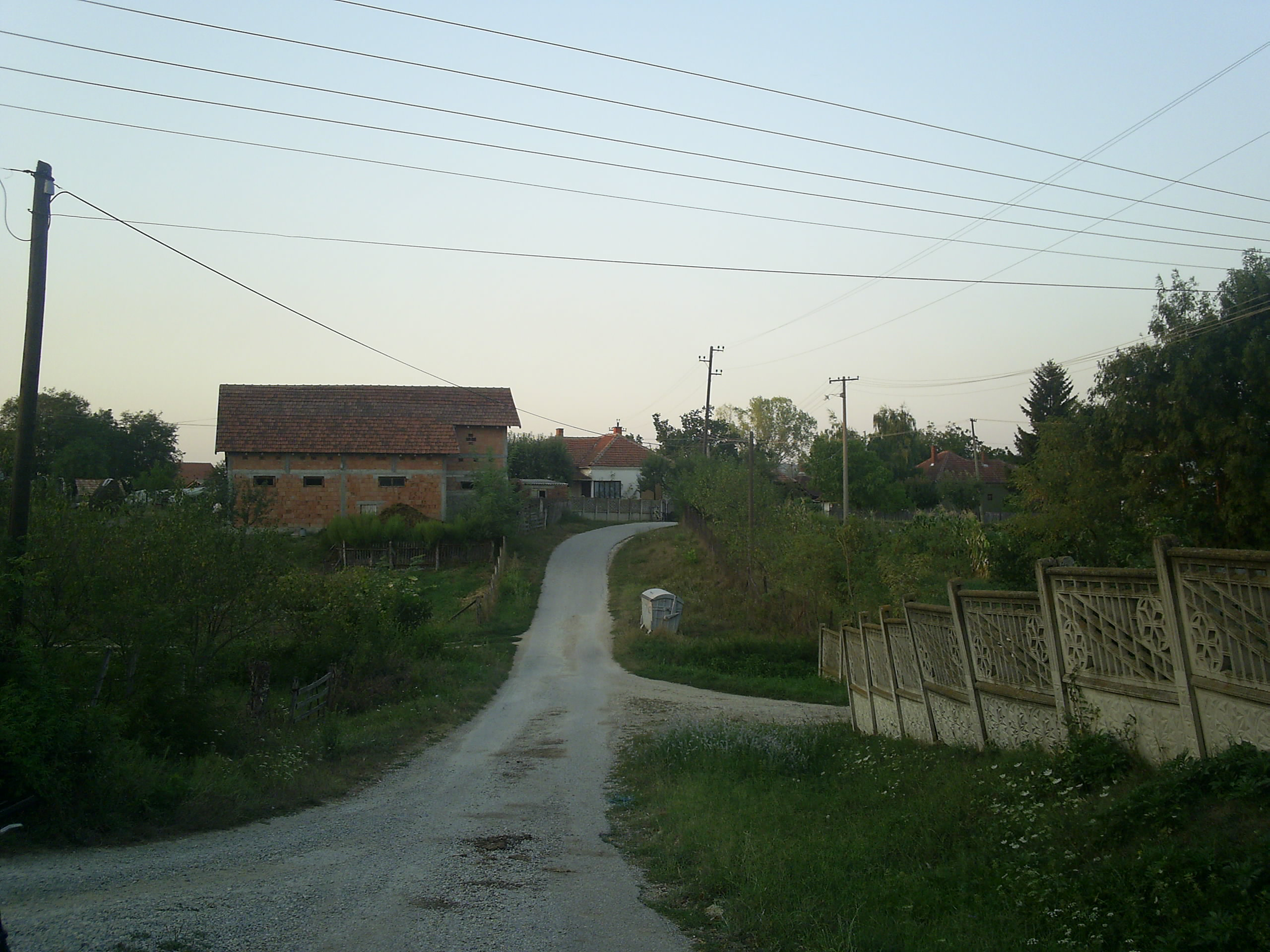
- Look at the village

- Location within Serbia
- Coordinates: 44°05′N 20°59′E
- Country: Serbia
- District: Šumadija
- Municipality: Batočina

Population (2002)
  - Total: 584
- Time zone: UTC+1 (CET)
  - Summer (DST): UTC+2 (CEST)

Milatovac (Serbian: Милатовац) is a village in the municipality of Batočina, Serbia. According to the 2002 census, the village has a population of 584 people.
