= Prnjavor, Batočina =

Prnjavor Прњавор
- Village (Selo)
- Location within Serbia
- Coordinates: 44°05′34″N 21°01′30″E
- Country: Serbia
- District: Šumadija
- Municipality: Batočina

Population (2011)
  - Total: ▼166
- Time zone: UTC+1 (CET)
  - Summer (DST): UTC+2 (CEST)

Prnjavor (Serbian Cyrillic: Прњавор) is a village in the municipality of Batočina, Serbia. According to the 2011 census, the village has a population of 166 people.
