= Crni Kao, Batočina =

Crni Kao Црни Као
- Village (Selo)
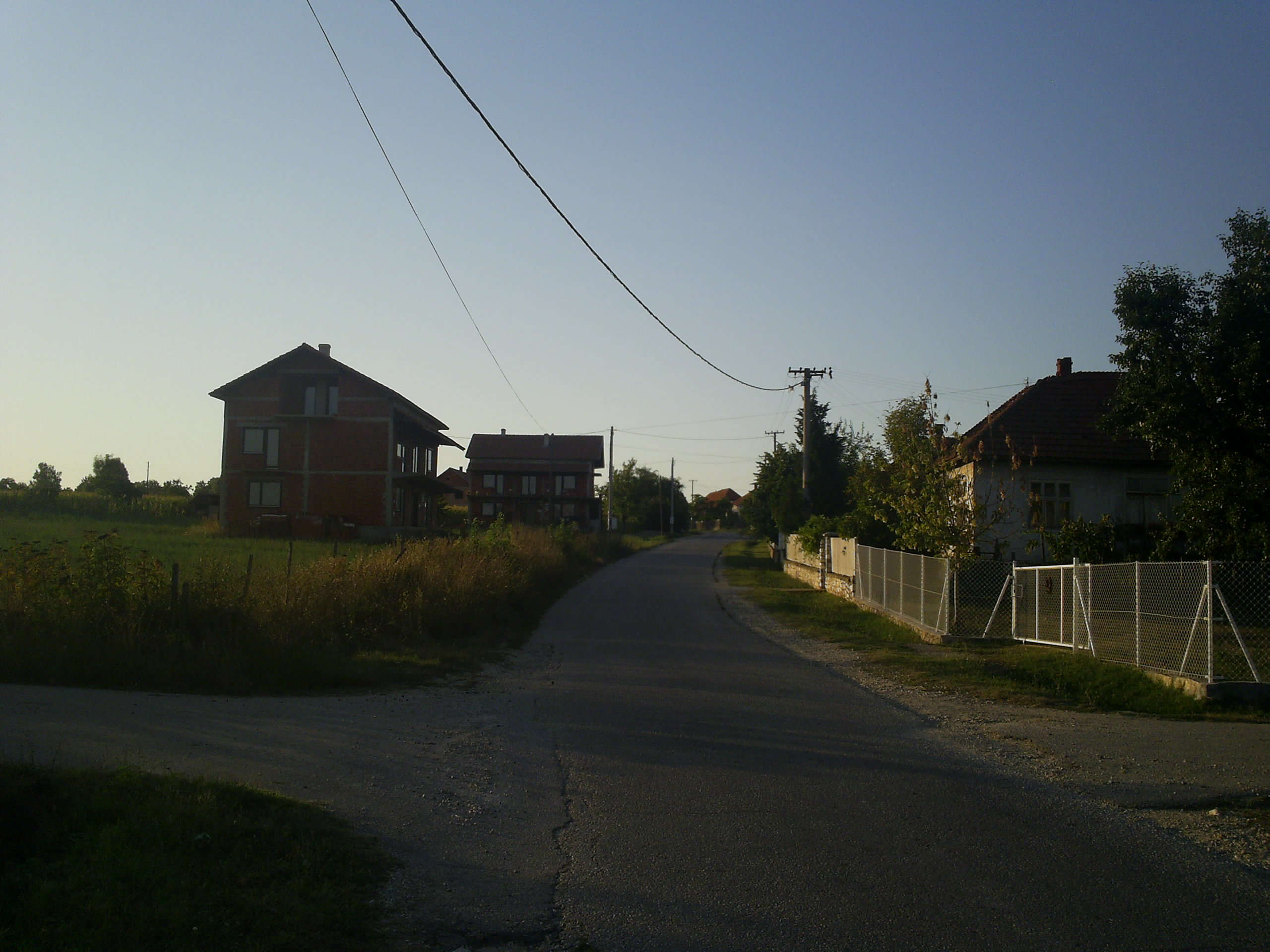

- Location within Serbia
- Coordinates: 44°10′32″N 21°02′15″E
- Country: Serbia
- District: Šumadija
- Municipality: Batočina

Population (2011)
  - Total: ▼410
- Time zone: UTC+1 (CET)
  - Summer (DST): UTC+2 (CEST)

Crni Kao (Serbian: Црни Као) is a village in the municipality of Batočina, Serbia. According to the 2011 census, the village has a population of 410 people.
