= Nikšić, Batočina =

Nikšić Никшић
- Village (Selo)
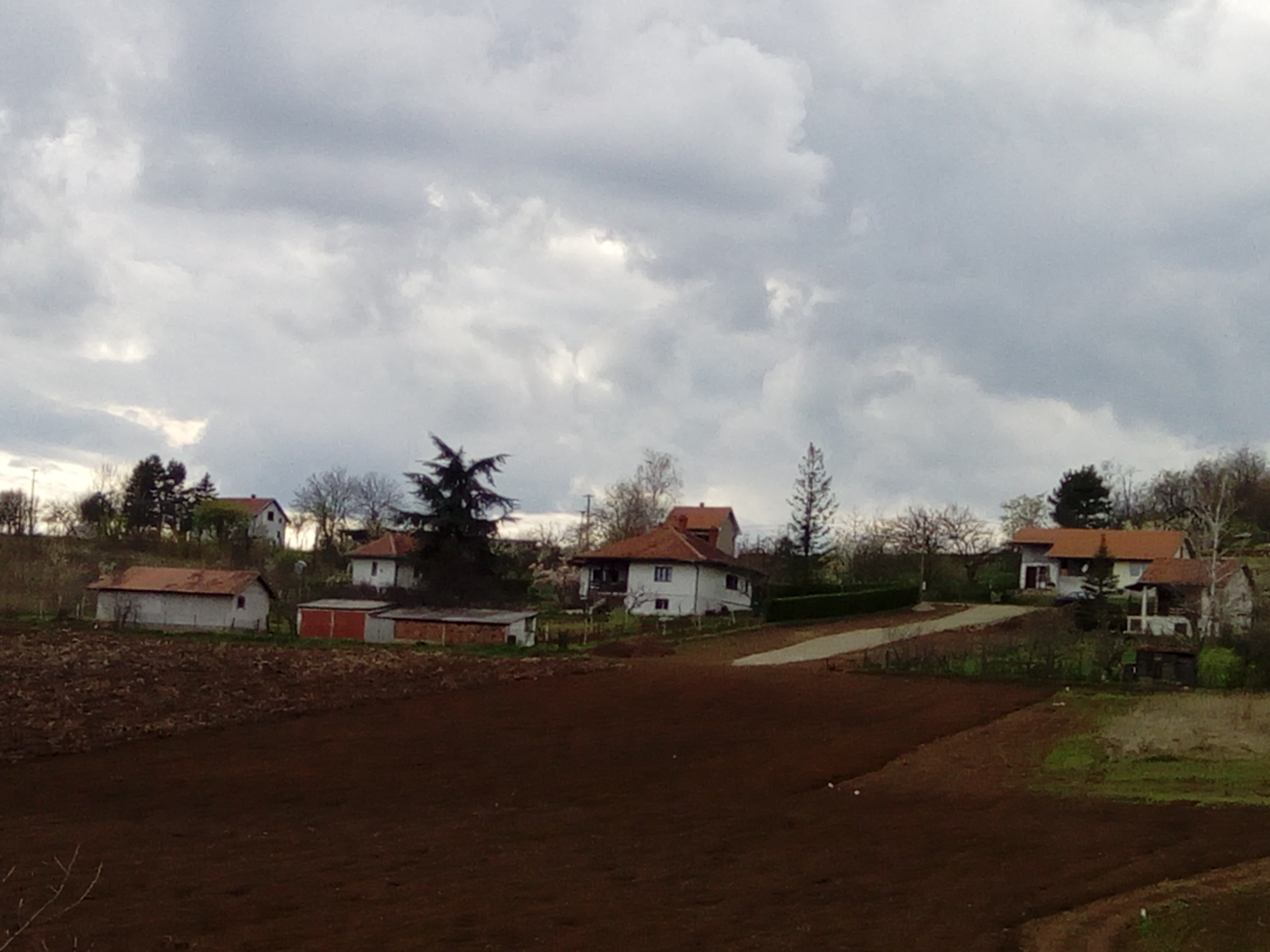

- Location within Serbia
- Coordinates: 44°05′57″N 21°01′10″E
- Country: Serbia
- District: Šumadija
- Municipality: Batočina

Population (2011)
  - Total: ▲176
- Time zone: UTC+1 (CET)
  - Summer (DST): UTC+2 (CEST)

Nikšić (Serbian Cyrillic: Никшић) is a village in the municipality of Batočina, Serbia. According to the 2011 census, the village had a population of 176 people.
