= Levac =

Levac is a surname. Notable people with the surname include:

- Alex Levac (born 1944), Israeli photojournalist and street photographer
- Dave Levac (born 1954), Canadian politician
- Priscilla Levac, Canadian snowboarder

== See also ==
- Levač, a historical region in central Serbia
