= Gradac, Batočina =

Gradac Градац
- Village (Selo)
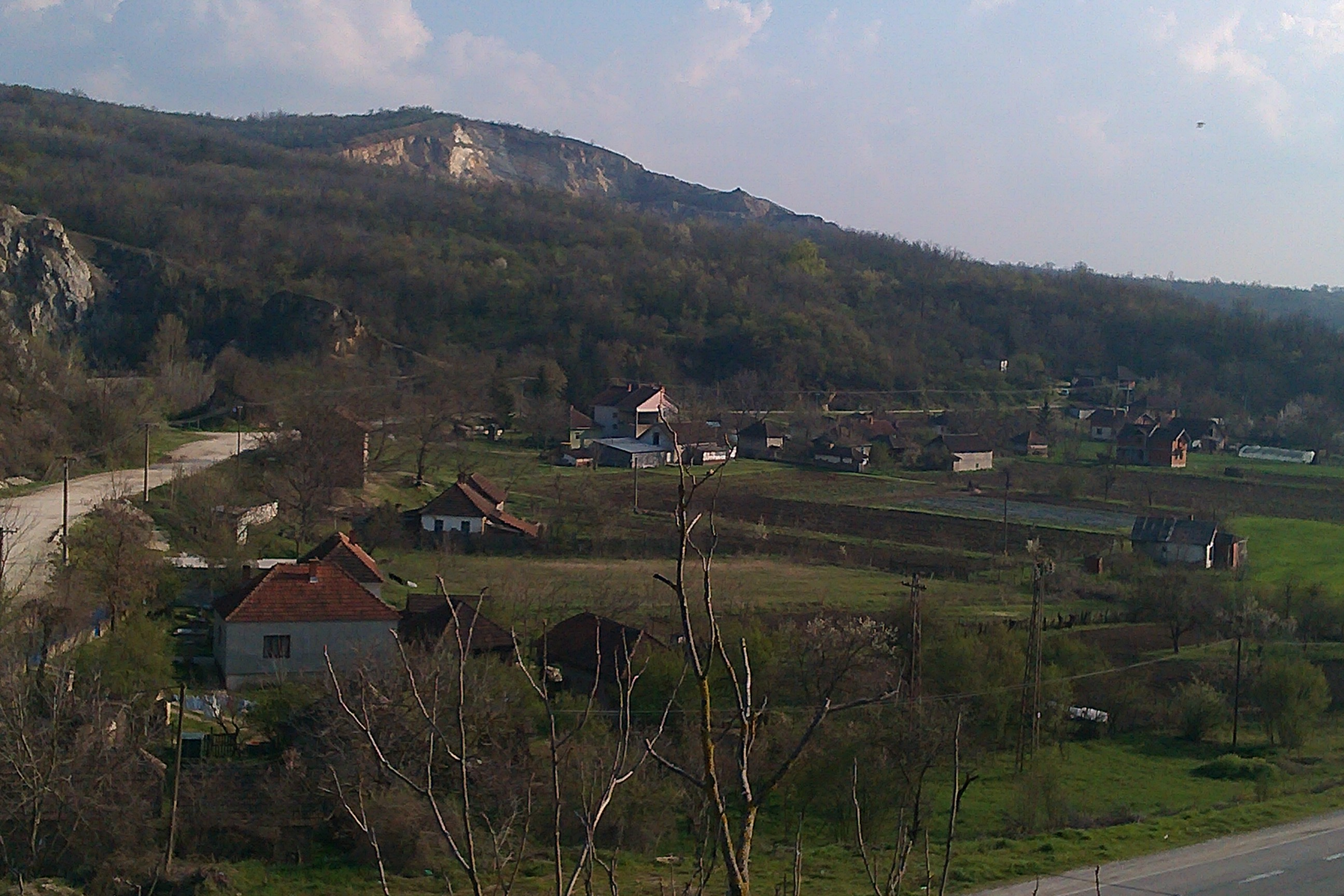
- Look at the village

- Location within Serbia
- Coordinates: 44°08′50″N 21°01′37″E
- Country: Serbia
- District: Šumadija
- Municipality: Batočina

Population (2011)
  - Total: ▼206
- Time zone: UTC+1 (CET)
  - Summer (DST): UTC+2 (CEST)

Gradac (Serbian Cyrillic: Градац) is a village in the municipality of Batočina, Serbia. According to the 2011 census, the village has a population of 206 people. The Gradac Cave located in the village is part of the Cultural Heritage of Serbia list, inscribed in 1979.
