= Dobrovodica =

- Village (Selo)
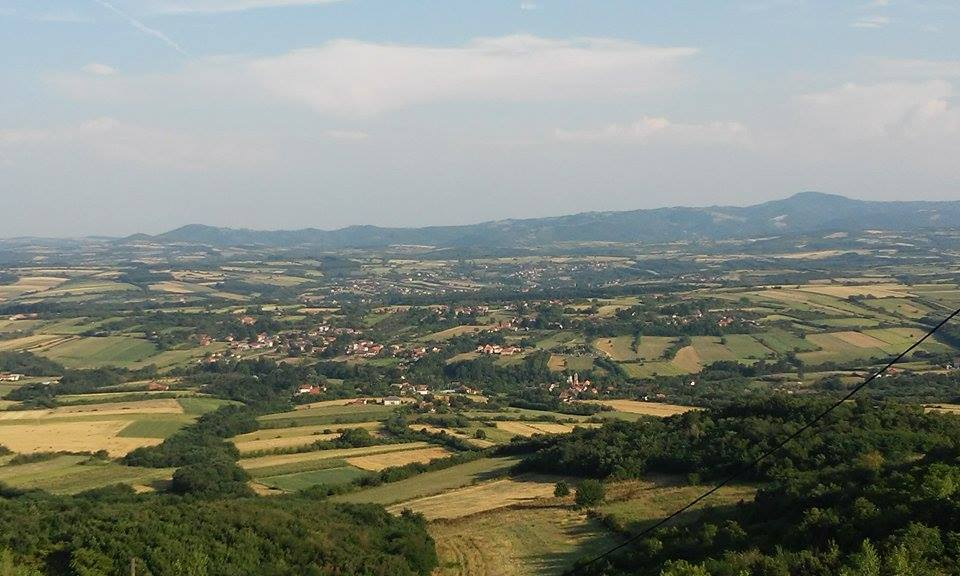

- Location within Serbia
- Coordinates: 44°07′10″N 21°03′46″E
- Country: Serbia
- District: Šumadija
- Municipality: Batočina

Population (2011)
  - Total: ▼381
- Time zone: UTC+1 (CET)
  - Summer (DST): UTC+2 (CEST)

Dobrovodica (Serbian: Доброводица) is a village in the municipality of Batočina, Serbia. According to the 2011 census, the village has a population of 381 people.
