= Krčmar =

Coordinates: 44.1556°N 19.9897°E

- Village (Selo)
- Interactive map of Krčmar
- Country: Serbia
- District: Kolubara District
- Municipality: Mionica
- Time zone: UTC+1 (CET)
  - Summer (DST): UTC+2 (CEST)

Krčmar is a village situated in Mionica municipality in Serbia.

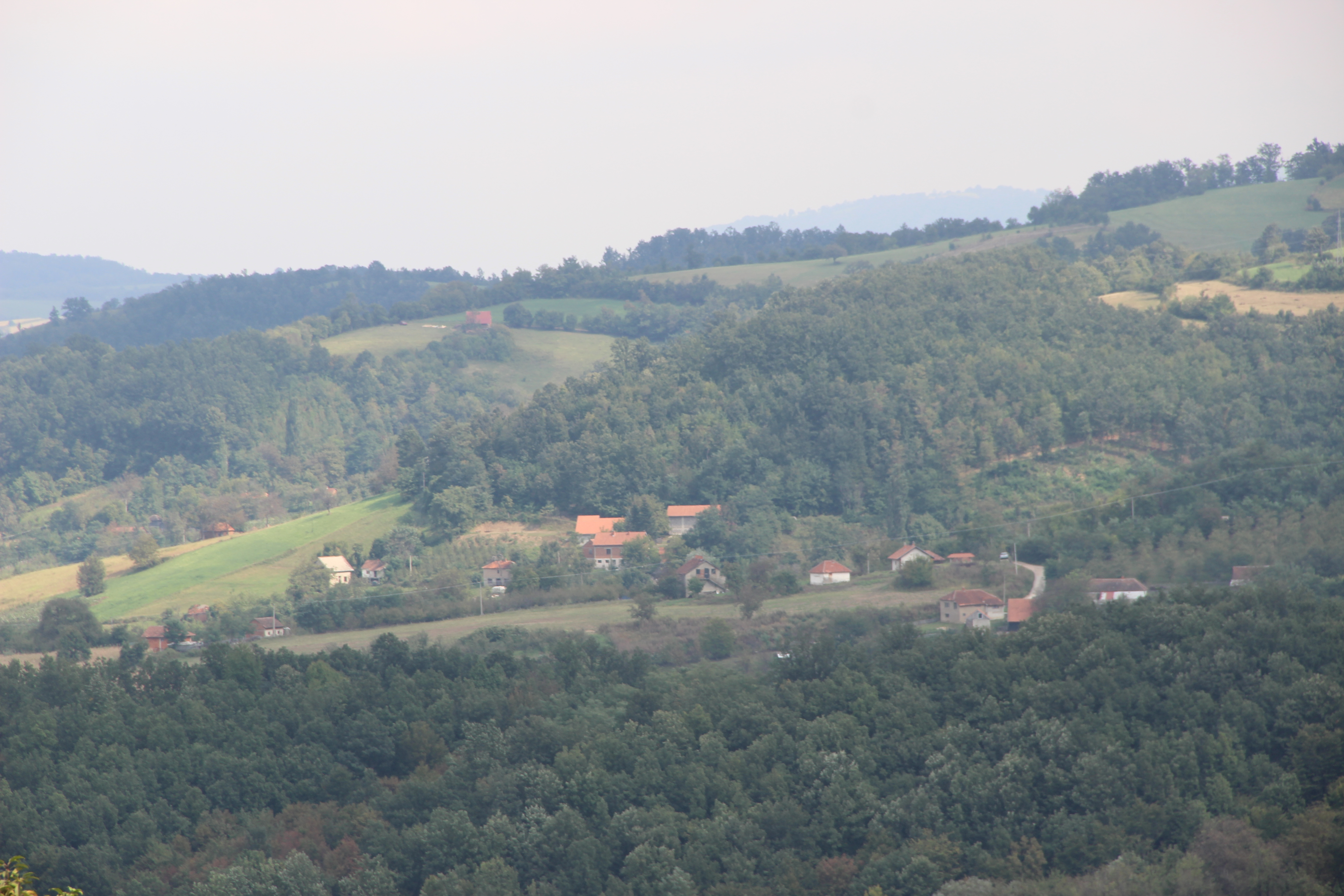
Krčmar - panorama

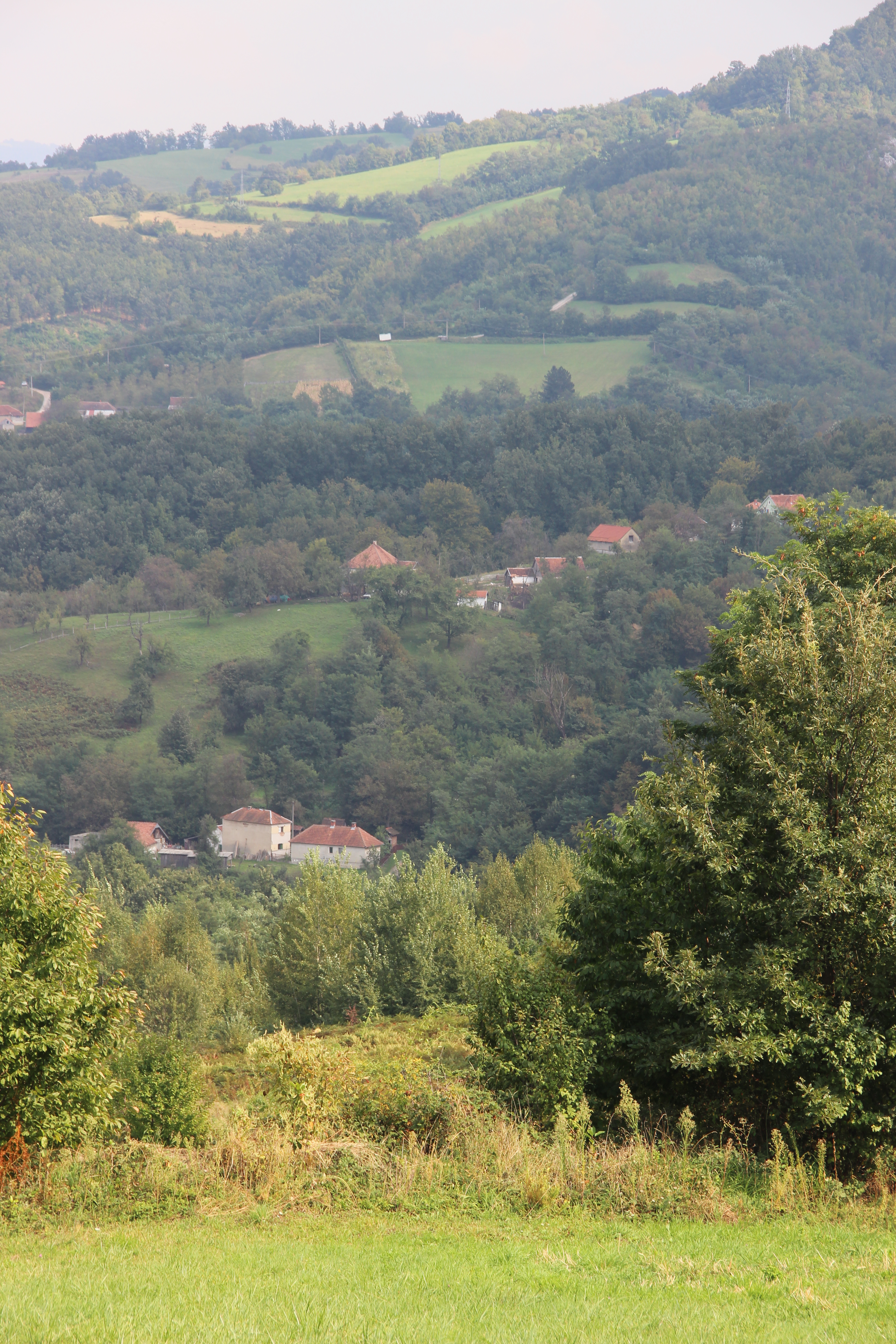
Krčmar - panorama

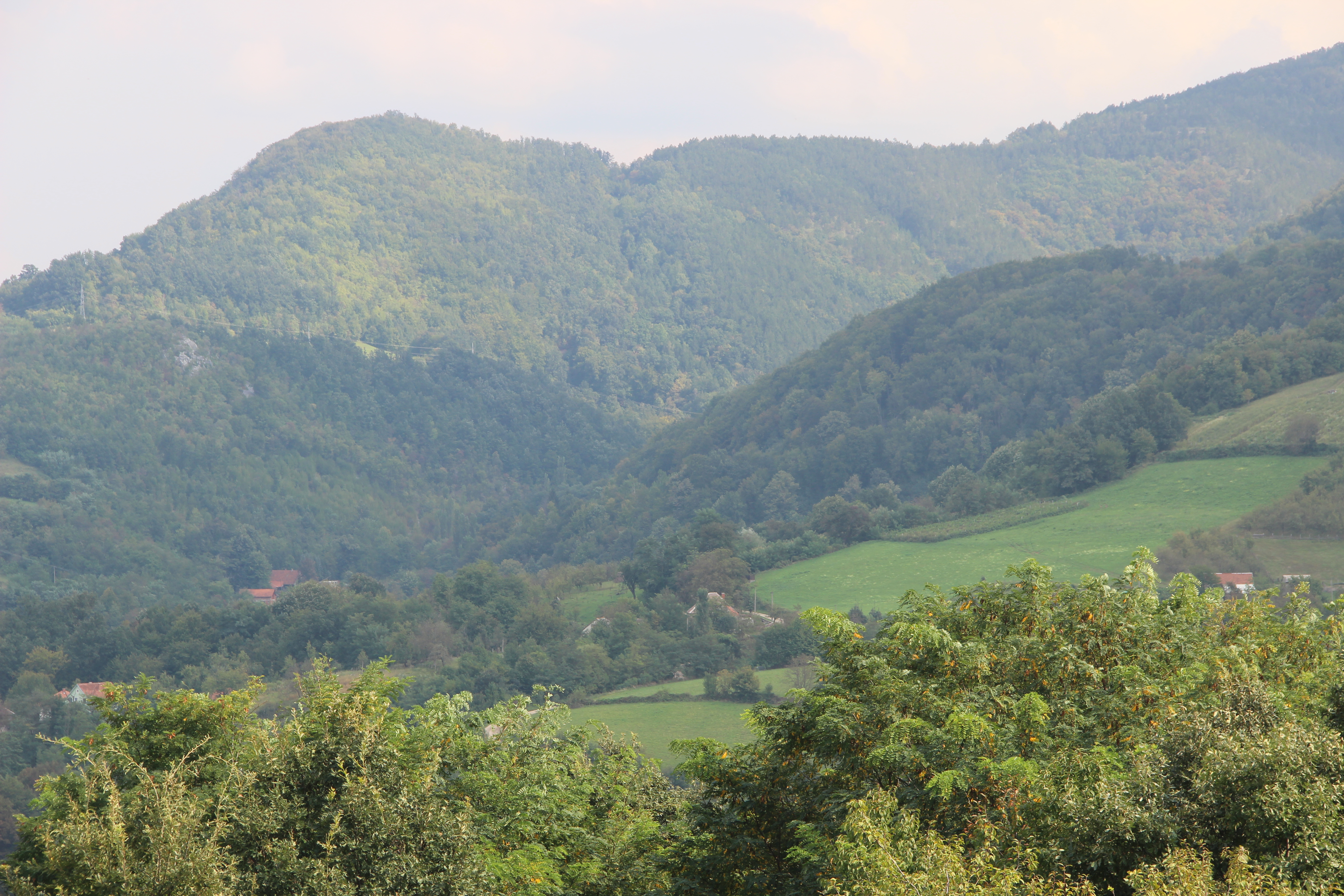
Krčmar - panorama

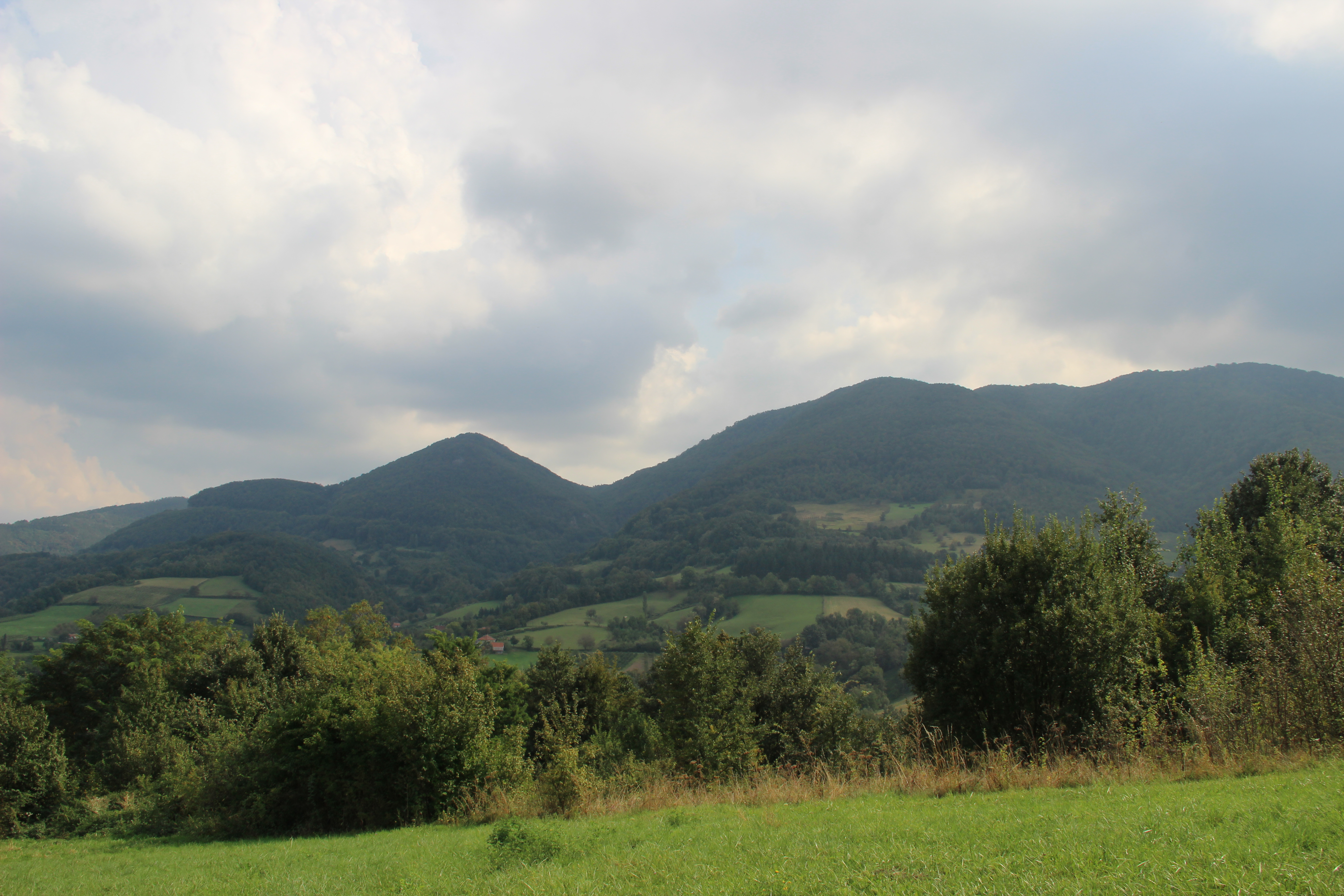
Krčmar - panorama

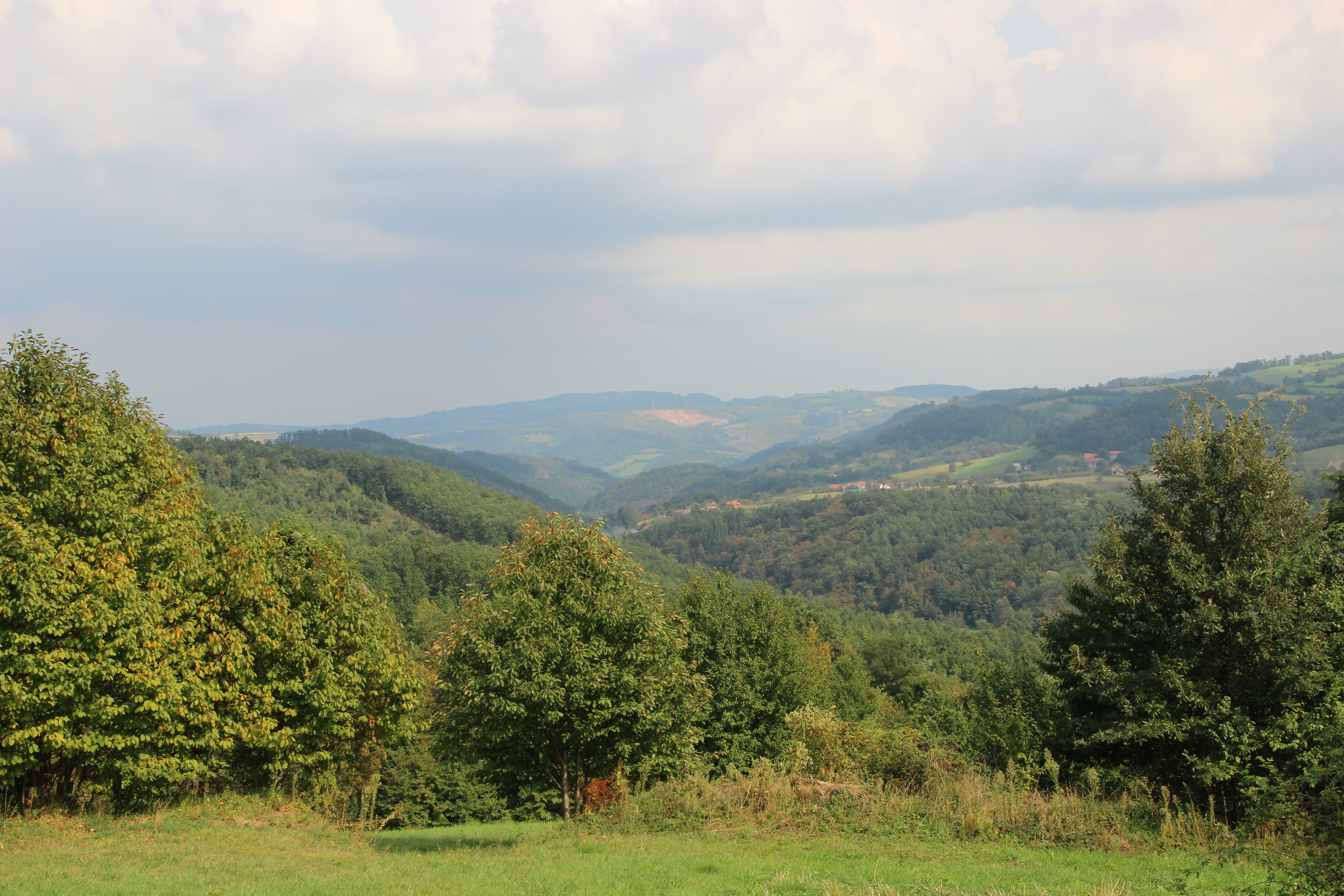
Krčmar - panorama

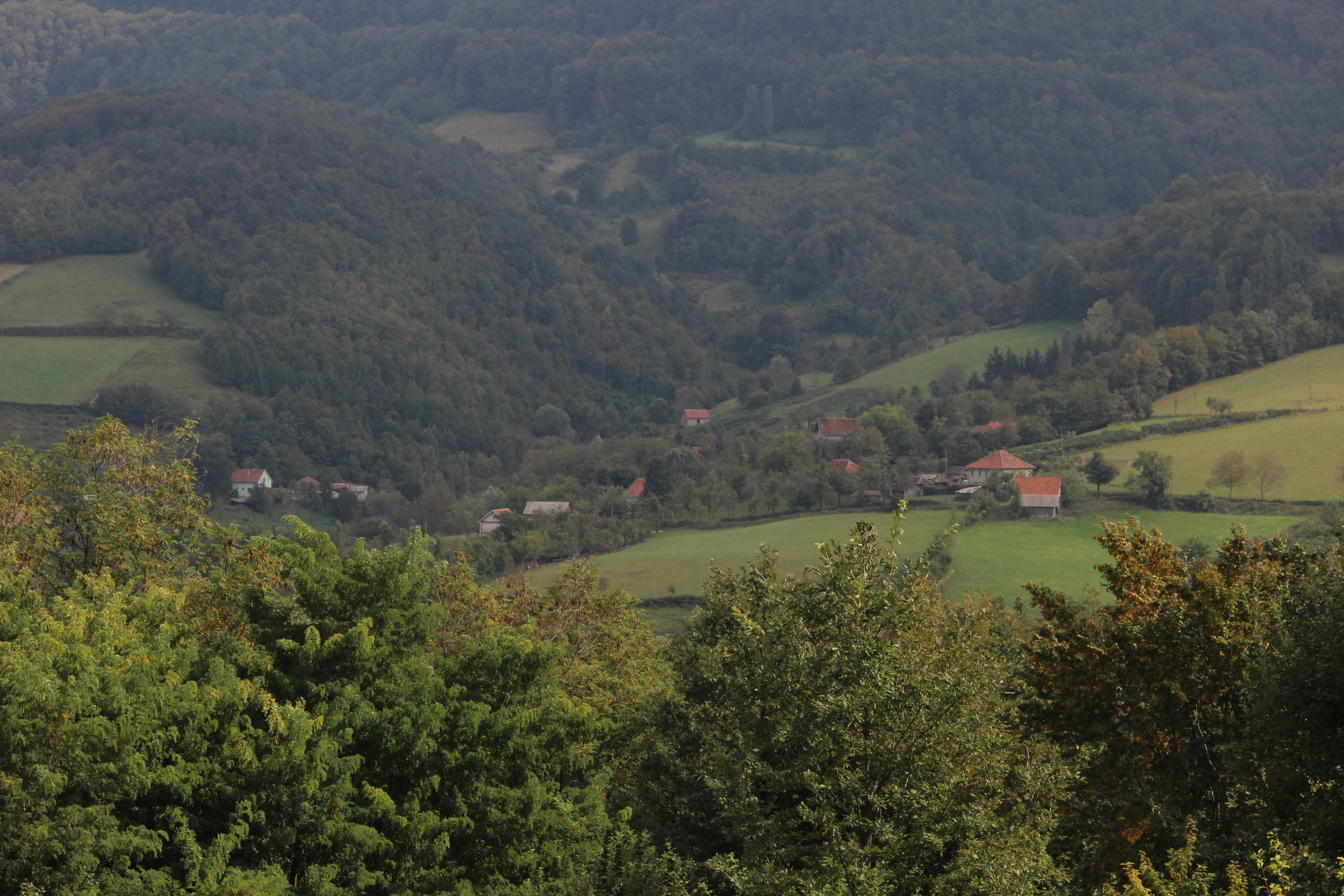
Krčmar - panorama
