= Batočina =

Batočina Баточина (Serbian)
- Town and municipality
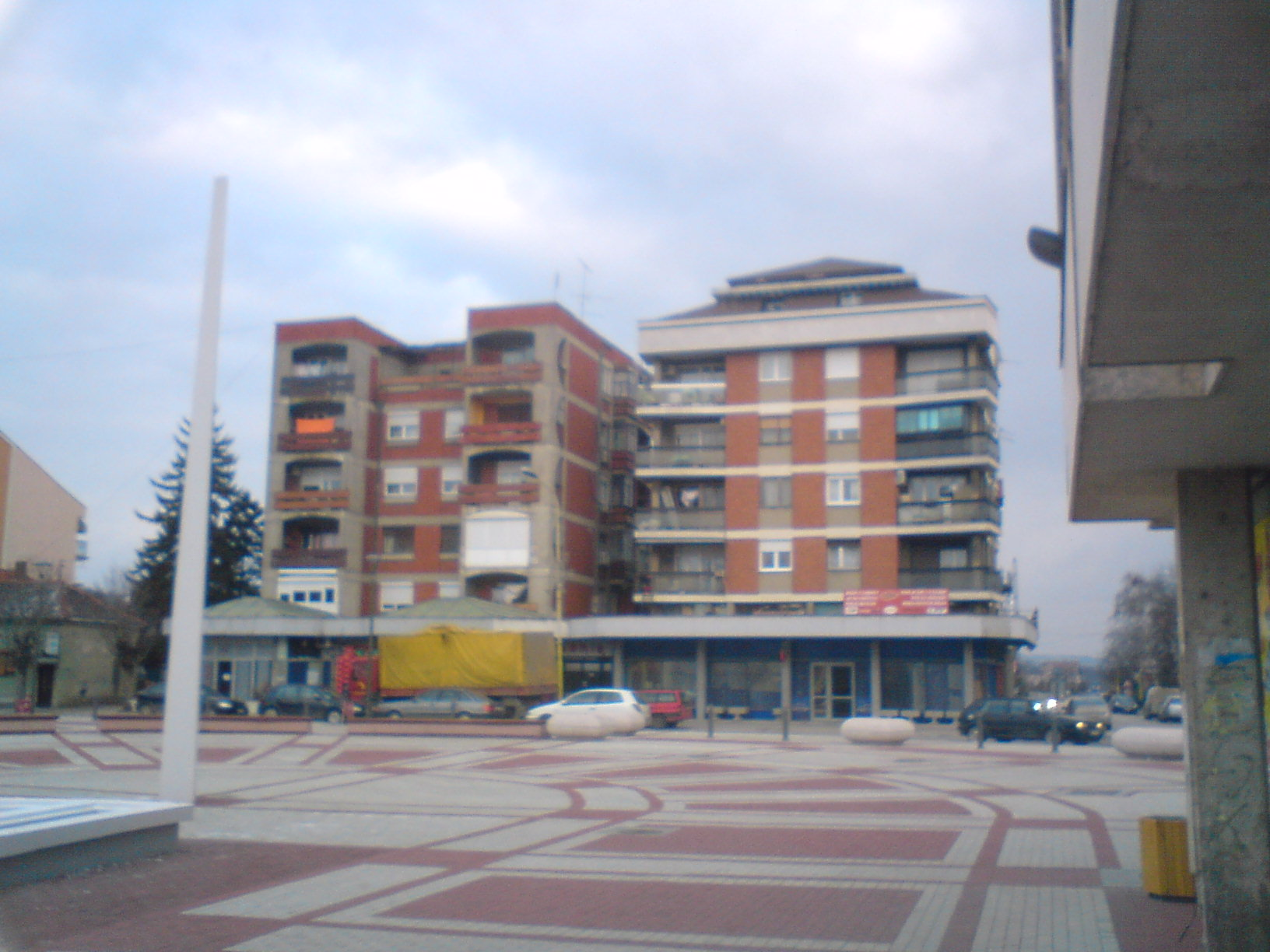

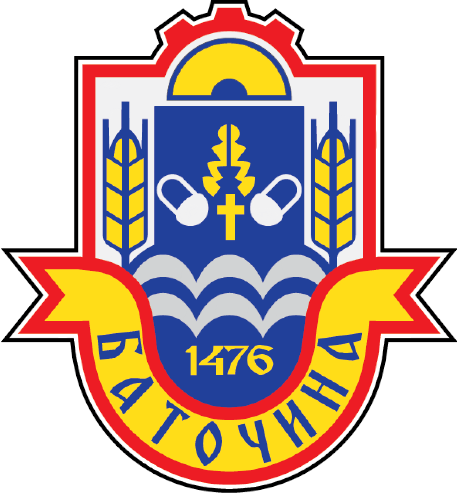
- Coat of arms

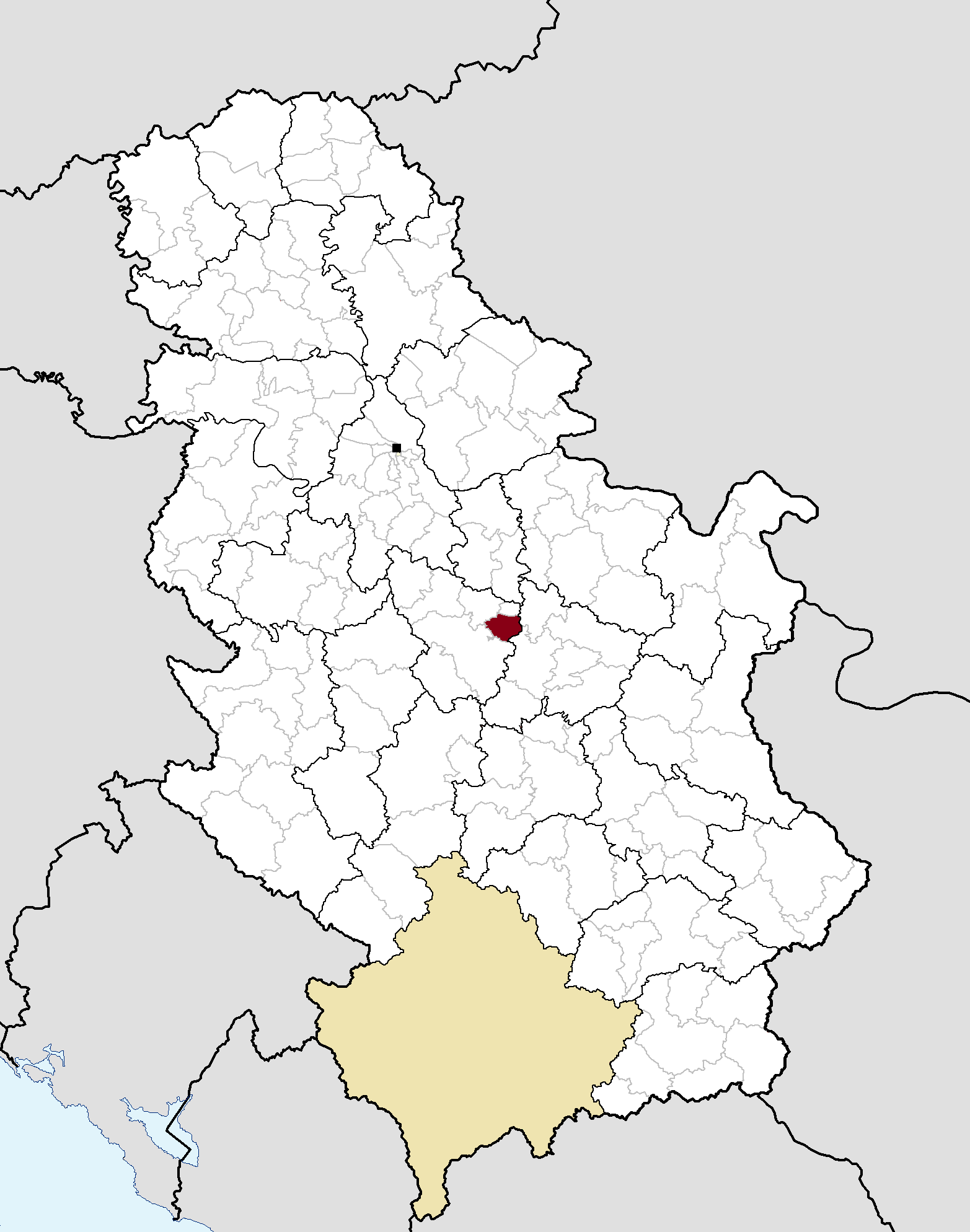
- Location of the municipality of Batočina within Serbia
- Coordinates: 44°09′N 21°05′E
- Country: Serbia
- Region: Šumadija and Western Serbia
- District: Šumadija
- Settlements: 11

Government
  - Mayor: Dejan Aranđelović (SNS)

Area
  - Municipality: 136 km^{2} (53 sq mi)
- Elevation: 111 m (364 ft)

Population (2022 census)
  - Town: 5,105
  - Municipality: 10,162
- Time zone: UTC+1 (CET)
  - Summer (DST): UTC+2 (CEST)
- Postal code: 34227
- Area code: +381(0)34
- Car plates: KG
- Website: www.opstinabatocina.org.rs

Batočina (Serbian: Баточина, pronounced [bâtɔtʃina]) is a town and municipality located in the Šumadija District of central Serbia. According to 2022 census, the population of the town is 5,105, while population of the municipality is 10,162.

== Settlements ==
Aside from the town of Batočina, the municipality includes the following settlements:

- Badnjevac
- Brzan
- Gradac
- Dobrovodica
- Žirovnica
- Kijevo
- Milatovac
- Nikšić
- Prnjavor
- Crni Kao

== Demographics ==
Historical population
Year	Pop.	±% p.a.
1948	12,003	—
1953	12,309	+0.50%
1961	12,455	+0.15%
1971	12,459	+0.00%
1981	13,452	+0.77%
1991	13,459	+0.01%
2002	12,220	−0.87%
2011	11,760	−0.43%
2022	10,162	−1.32%

== Economy ==
The following table gives a preview of total number of employed people per their core activity (as of 2017):

Activity	Total
Agriculture, forestry and fishing	3
Mining	40
Processing industry	981
Distribution of power, gas and water	27
Distribution of water and water waste management	94
Construction	45
Wholesale and retail, repair	414
Traffic, storage and communication	81
Hotels and restaurants	33
Media and telecommunications	27
Finance and insurance	19
Property stock and charter	5
Professional, scientific, innovative and technical activities	30
Administrative and other services	37
Administration and social assurance	117
Education	156
Healthcare and social work	105
Art, leisure and recreation	24
Other services	28
Total	2,266
