= Brzan =

Brzan Брзан
- Village (Selo)
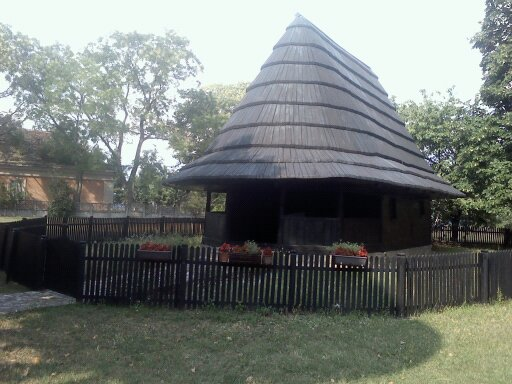
- Wooden church in Brzan built in 1822

- Location of Brzan in Serbia
- Coordinates: 44°06′55″N 21°08′00″E
- Country: Serbia
- District: Šumadija
- Municipality: Batočina
- Elevation: 344 ft (105 m)

Population (2011)
  - Total: 1,754
- Time zone: UTC+1 (CET)
  - Summer (DST): UTC+2 (CEST)
- Postal code: 34228
- Area code: 034
- Geocode: 702854
- Car plates: KG

Brzan (Serbian: Брзан) is a village in the municipality of Batočina in the Šumadija District of Serbia. The population was 1,754 in the 2011 census.

== Geography ==
The village of Brzan is located in the central part of Serbia, on the eastern edge of Šumadija District. It lies 6.09 kilometres (3.78 mi) to the south of the town of Batočina, the seat of the municipality. The nearest cities are Jagodina 18.48 kilometres (11.48 mi) to the southeast and Kragujevac 22 kilometres (14 mi) to the southwest. Belgrade is 95.27 kilometres (59.20 mi) to the northeast. Brzan lies along the Great Morava River.

== Demographics ==
As of the 2011 census, there were 1,754 people, 602 households and 514 families residing in the village. The average household size was 2.91 and the average family size was 2.83.

Of the total families, 45.9% were couples living together with children, 41.1% were couples living together without children, 8.6% had a female householder with no husband present, and 4.5% had a male householder with no wife present. 26.4% of total households were made up of individuals; 40.4% had 2 or 3 members; 21.6% had 4 or 5 members; and 11.6% had 6 or more members.

The median age in the village was 46.4 years. 14.4% of residents were under the age of 18; 14.6% were between the ages of 18 and 29; 21.9% were from 30 to 49; 31.1% were from 50 to 69; and 18.0% were 70 years of age or older. The gender makeup of the village was 50.5% male and 49.5% female.

According to the 2002 census, the village had a population of 2,073 people. The ethnic composition of the village was 99.3% Serbian, with 0.7% identifying as other groups. The population has declined over the past 5 censuses since 1961.

Historical population

Year	Pop.	±%
1948	3,480	—
1953	3,629	+4.3%
1961	3,506	−3.4%
1971	3,201	−8.7%

Year	Pop.	±%
1981	2,954	−7.7%
1991	2,694	−8.8%
2002	2,073	−23.1%
2011	1,754	−15.4%

Source data

== Transportation ==
The village has a railway station along the main line between Belgrade and Niš. The nearest main road is State Road 158, providing transport links north and south. The A1 Motorway, which is part of the European Route E75, runs by the village and is accessible at Batočina.
