= Cvetojevac =

Cvetojevac Цветојевац (Serbian)
- Village
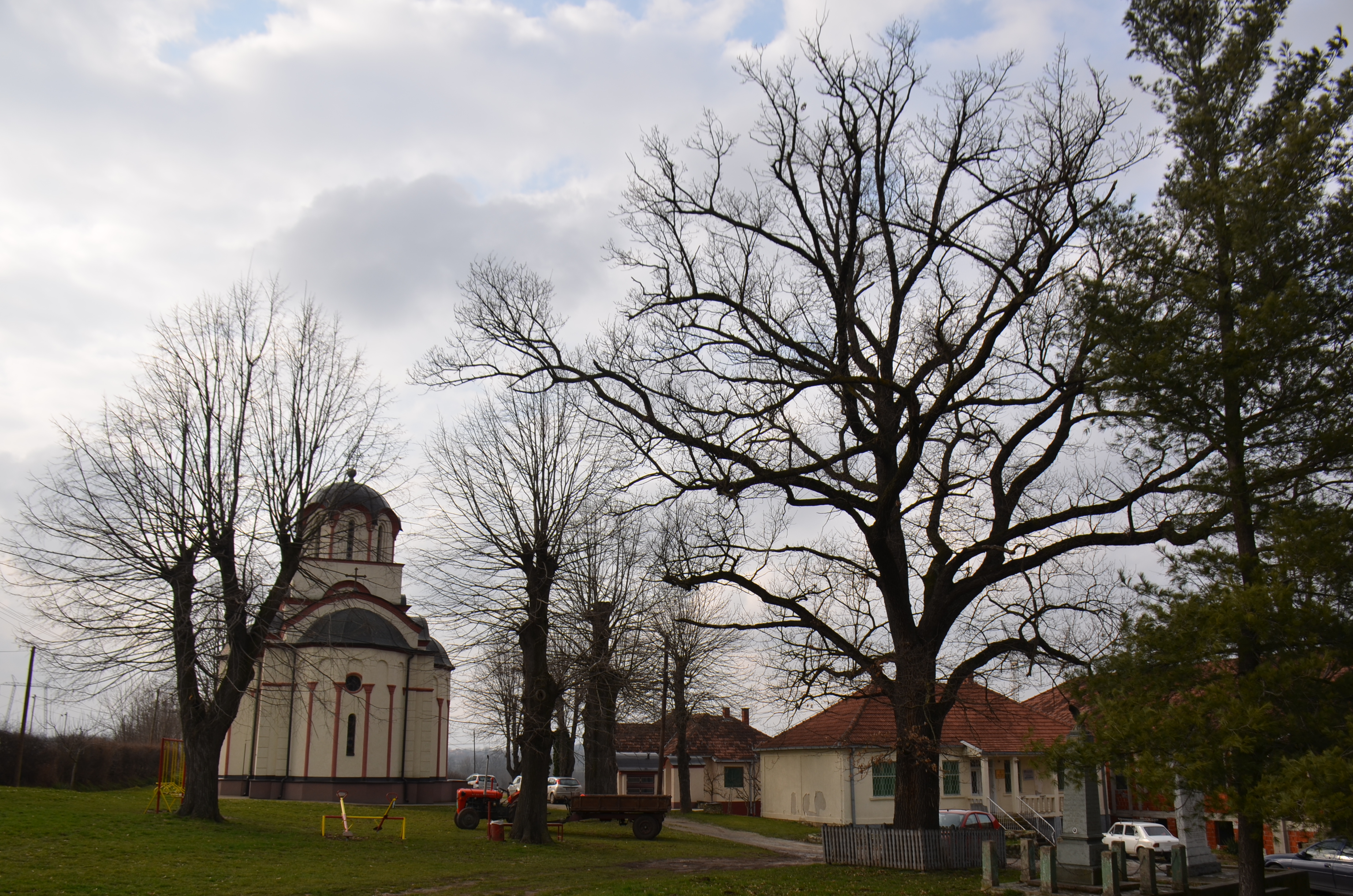

- Location within Serbia
- Coordinates: 44°04′N 20°59′E
- Country: Serbia
- District: Šumadija
- Municipality: Aerodrom

Population (2011)
  - Total: 841
- Time zone: UTC+1 (CET)
  - Summer (DST): UTC+2 (CEST)

Cvetojevac (Serbian: Цветојевац) is a village in the Šumadija District, Serbia. According to the 2011 census, the village has a population of 841. It belonged to municipality of Aerodrom from 2002. to 2008. when municipality was abolished. Village was founded in the year 1789.

Fields are 504.47 ha, orchards 24.32 ha, vineyards 4.12 ha, meadows 90.83 ha, pastures 9.86 ha, while the rest of the land occupies 7.85 ha.

== Geography ==
The territory of the village of Cvetojevac is located in the central part of Serbia. It is located in the eastern part of Šumadija and covers the catchment area of the middle flow of Lepenica river (the tributaries of the Great Morava river) on whose left bank is located. Surface area of Cvetojevac occupies an area of 750 hectares and is located in the eastern part of the territory of the city of Kragujevac.

Cvetojevac borders on the north with Resnik, in the east with Botunje south with Korman and Jovanovac and in the west with Novi Milanovac.

Cvetojevac is located at 206 meters above sea level, about 10 km northeast of Kragujevac and about 130 km south of Belgrade. The railway line Lapovo – Kragujevac – Kraljevo passes through the settlement. It is located near the State Road 24 (Serbia), Batocina – Kragujevac.

== History ==
According to the legend, the village was named after someone named Cvetoje who first came to the area of today's village. According to historical data, Cvetojevac was founded during the Koča's frontier, around 1789. It was founded by five families: Asurjići, Biorci, Miyailovići, Mladenovići and Sretenovići. Over time, the village grew by settlement of the population. During the First Serbian Uprising, 8 families settled, and after 1815, another 15 families settled.

According to the population census in 1903, Cvetojevac had 634, and seven years later 793 inhabitants. After the First World War, Cvetojevac numbered 735 people, and the decline in the number of inhabitants can be attributed to the great suffering of Serbs in the war. After the Second World War, the number of inhabitants varied from 692 in 1981 to 776 in 1991. The latest census showed an increase in the number of inhabitants, and now Cvetojevac has 841 inhabitants, the largest number in history. This was influenced by the proximity of the city of Kragujevac, which is only 10 kilometers away from the settlement.

There is a Jewish cemetery in the village, and the village patron saint is St. Luke. The village church is dedicated to the Holy Prophet Elijah. In the village there is an elementary school "19. October ", which is subsidiary of its parent school in Maršić.
