= State Road 25 (Serbia) =

Road in Serbia

State Road 25
- Serbian: Državni put IB reda 25; Serbian Cyrillic: Државни пут IБ реда 25

Route information
- Maintained by JP "Putevi Srbije"
- Length: 74.816 km (46.489 mi)

Major junctions
- From: Mali Požarevac A1 / E75
- To: Kragujevac 24

Location
- Country: Serbia
- Districts: City of Belgrade, Šumadija

Highway system
- Roads in Serbia; Motorways
← 24	→ 26

State Road 25 is an IB-class road in northern and central Serbia, connecting Mali Požarevac with Kragujevac. It is located in Belgrade and Šumadija and Western Serbia regions.

Before the new road categorization regulation given in 2013, the route wore the following names: M 23 (before 2012) / 16 (after 2012).

The existing route is a main road with two traffic lanes. By the valid Space Plan of Republic of Serbia the road is not planned for upgrading to motorway, and is expected to be conditioned in its current state.

== Sections ==
Section number	Length	Distance	Section name
02501	0.750 km (0.466 mi)	0.750 km (0.466 mi)	Mali Požarevac interchange - Mali Požarevac
02502	7.688 km (4.777 mi)	8.438 km (5.243 mi)	Mali Požarevac - Vlaško Polje
02503	5.991 km (3.723 mi)	14.429 km (8.966 mi)	Vlaško Polje - Mladenovac (Dubona)
02504	2.093 km (1.301 mi)	16.522 km (10.266 mi)	Mladenovac (Dubona) - Mladenovac
02505	5.114 km (3.178 mi)	21.636 km (13.444 mi)	Mladenovac - Međulužje
02506	12.506 km (7.771 mi)	34.142 km (21.215 mi)	Međulužje - Krćevac
02507	4.515 km (2.805 mi)	38.657 km (24.020 mi)	Krćevac - Topola (overlap with)
02508	1.034 km (0.642 mi)	39.691 km (24.663 mi)	Topola - Topola (Natalinci) (overlap with)
02509	11.338 km (7.045 mi)	51.029 km (31.708 mi)	Topola (Natalinci) - Gornja Trnava
02510	3.193 km (1.984 mi)	54.222 km (33.692 mi)	Gornja Trnava - Vlakča
02511	12.361 km (7.681 mi)	66.583 km (41.373 mi)	Vlakča - Cerovac
02512	8.233 km (5.116 mi)	74.816 km (46.489 mi)	Cerovac - Kragujevac (Cerovac)

== See also ==
- Roads in Serbia
