= Aerodrom, Kragujevac =

Aerodrom Аеродром
- City municipality
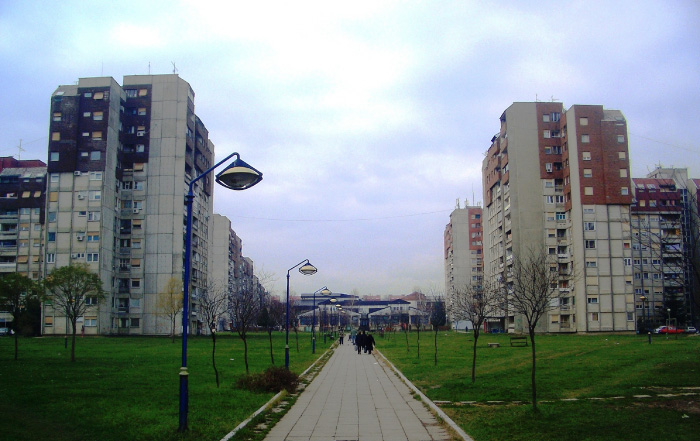
- Residential neighborhoods of Aerodrom

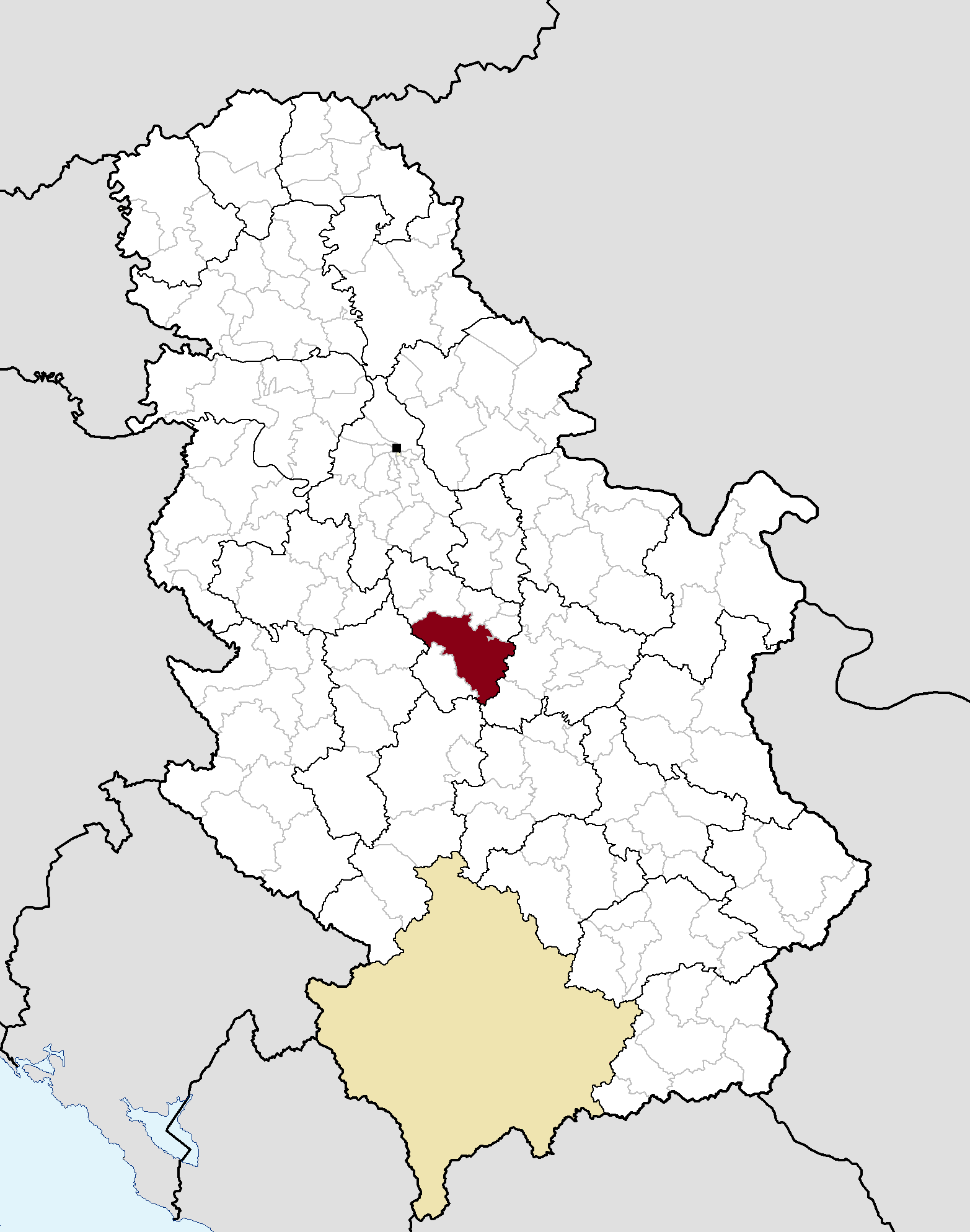
- Location of the municipality of Aerodrom within Serbia
- Coordinates: 44°01′57″N 20°54′18″E
- Country: Serbia
- Region: Šumadija and Western Serbia
- District: Šumadija
- Municipality: Kragujevac
- Founded: 31 May 2002
- Dissolved: 4 March 2008
- Settlements: 17

Area
  - Municipality: 232 km^{2} (90 sq mi)

Population (2002 census)
  - Urban: 23,249
  - Municipality: 36,217
- Time zone: UTC+1 (CET)
  - Summer (DST): UTC+2 (CEST)
- Postal code: 34000
- Area code: +381(0)34
- Car plates: KG

Aerodrom (Serbian Cyrillic: Аеродром; meaning Airport) was one of five city municipalities which constituted the City of Kragujevac. According to the 2002 census results, the municipality had a population of 36,217 inhabitants. The municipality was formed in May 2002, only to be dissolved in March 2008.

== Municipality ==
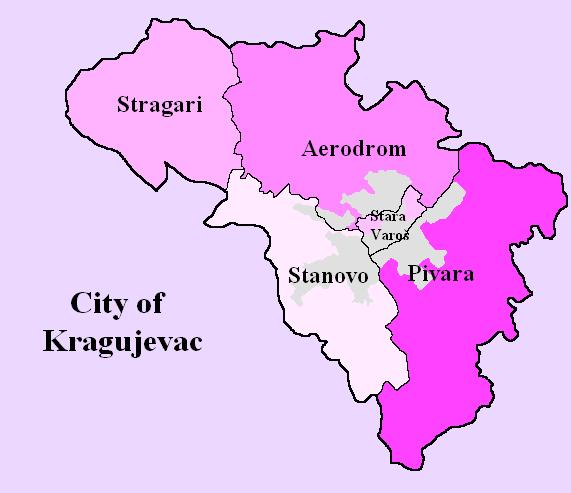
Map of the city municipalities which constituted the city of Kragujevac

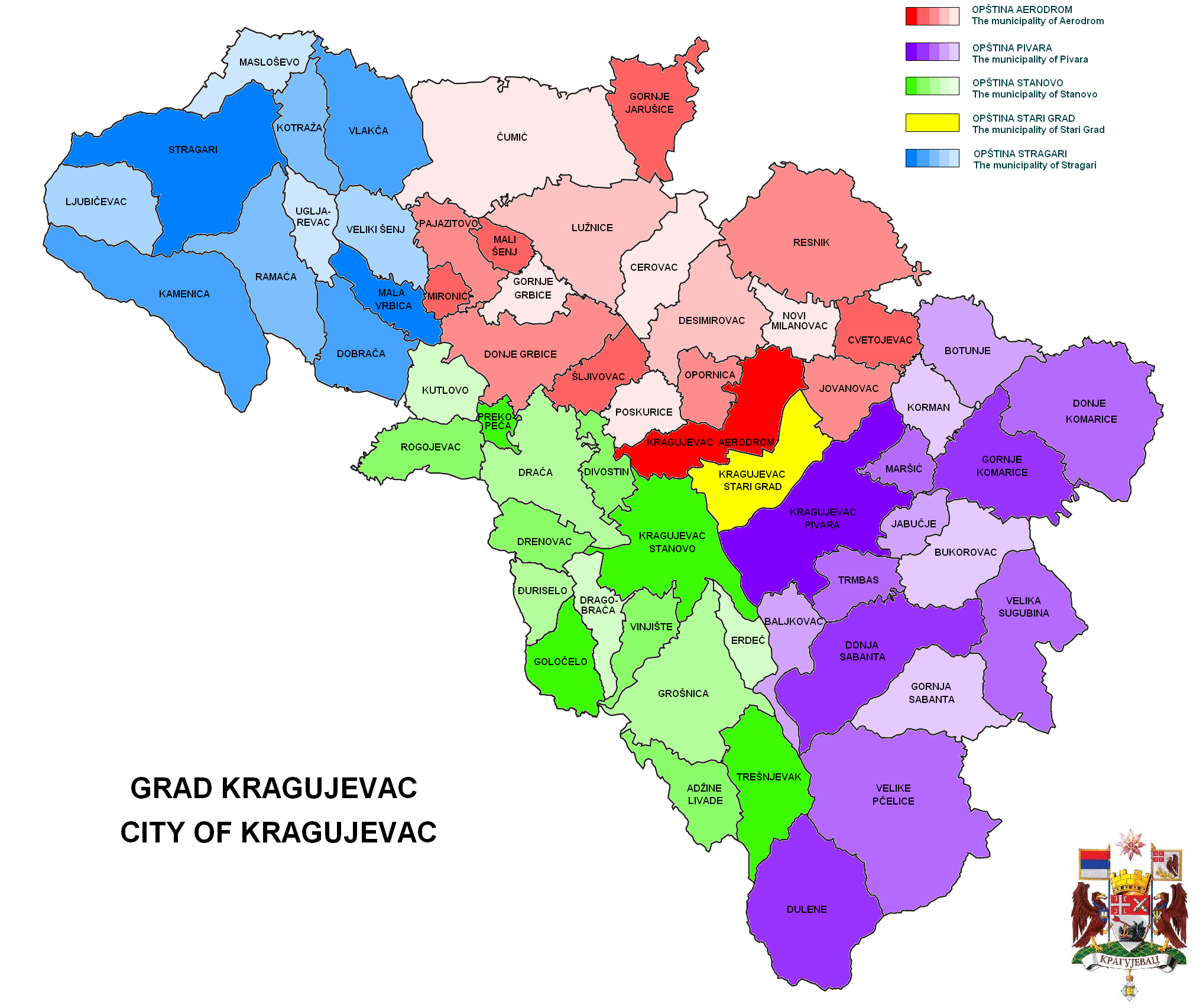
Map of the city municipalities with settlements

The Municipality of Aerodrom covered the area of about 232 square kilometres, and comprised a part of urban Kragujevac and 17 villages:

- Aerodrom
- Uglješnica
- Vinogradi
- Šumarice
- Jovanovac
- Cvetojevac
- Resnik
- Novi Milanovac
- Petrovac
- Opornica
- Desimirovac
- Cerovac
- Lužnice
- Gornje Jarušice
- Čumić
- Mali Šenj
- Pajazitovo
- Mironić
- Gornje Grbice
- Šljivovac
- Poskurice
- Erdec

== Gallery ==
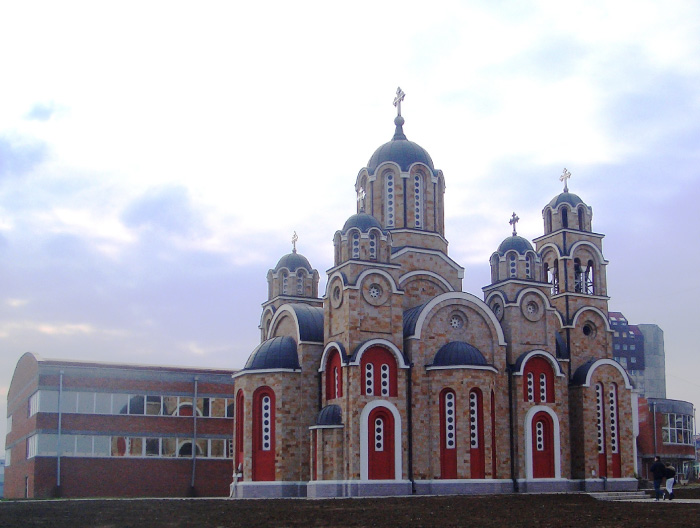
The Cathedral of Saint Sava, Aerodrom, Kragujevac

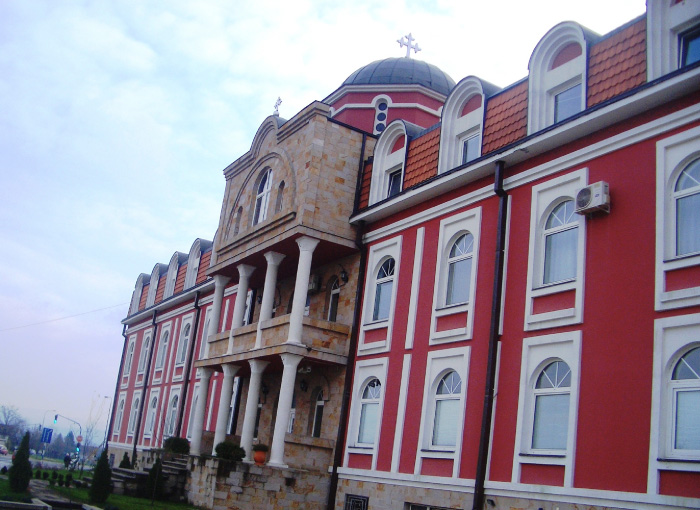
School Seminary of Saint Jovan Zlatousti, Aerodrom, Kragujevac.

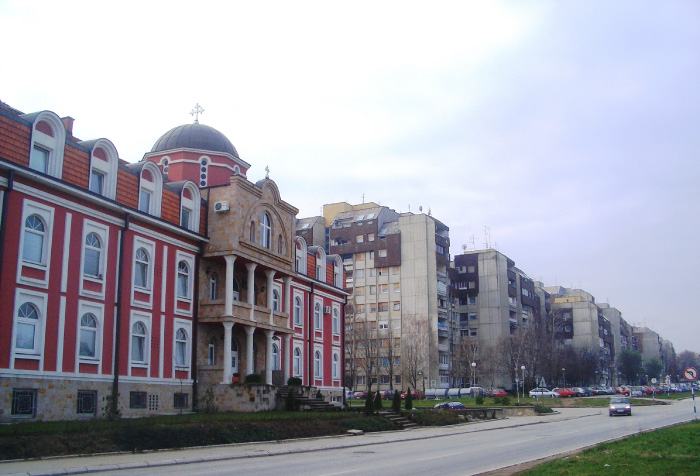
School Seminary of Saint Jovan Zlatousti, Aerodrom, Kragujevac.

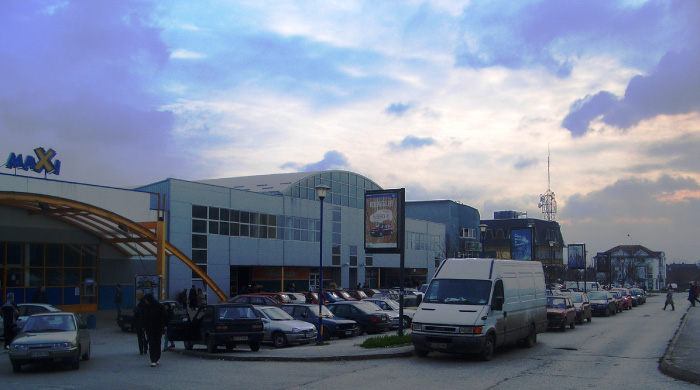
Description City Market, Aerodrom, City of Kragujevac.

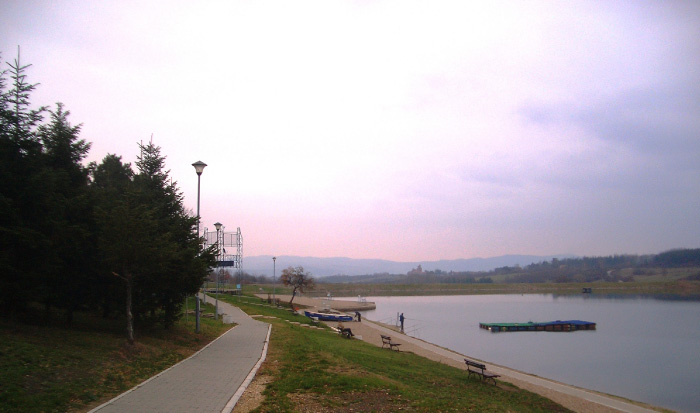
Lake of Šumarice
