= State Road 24 (Serbia) =

Road in Serbia

State Road 24
- Serbian: Državni put IB reda 24; Serbian Cyrillic: Државни пут IБ реда 24

Route information
- Part of E761 Kraljevo – Kraljevo (Kamidžora)
- Maintained by JP "Putevi Srbije"
- Length: 63.747 km (39.611 mi)

Major junctions
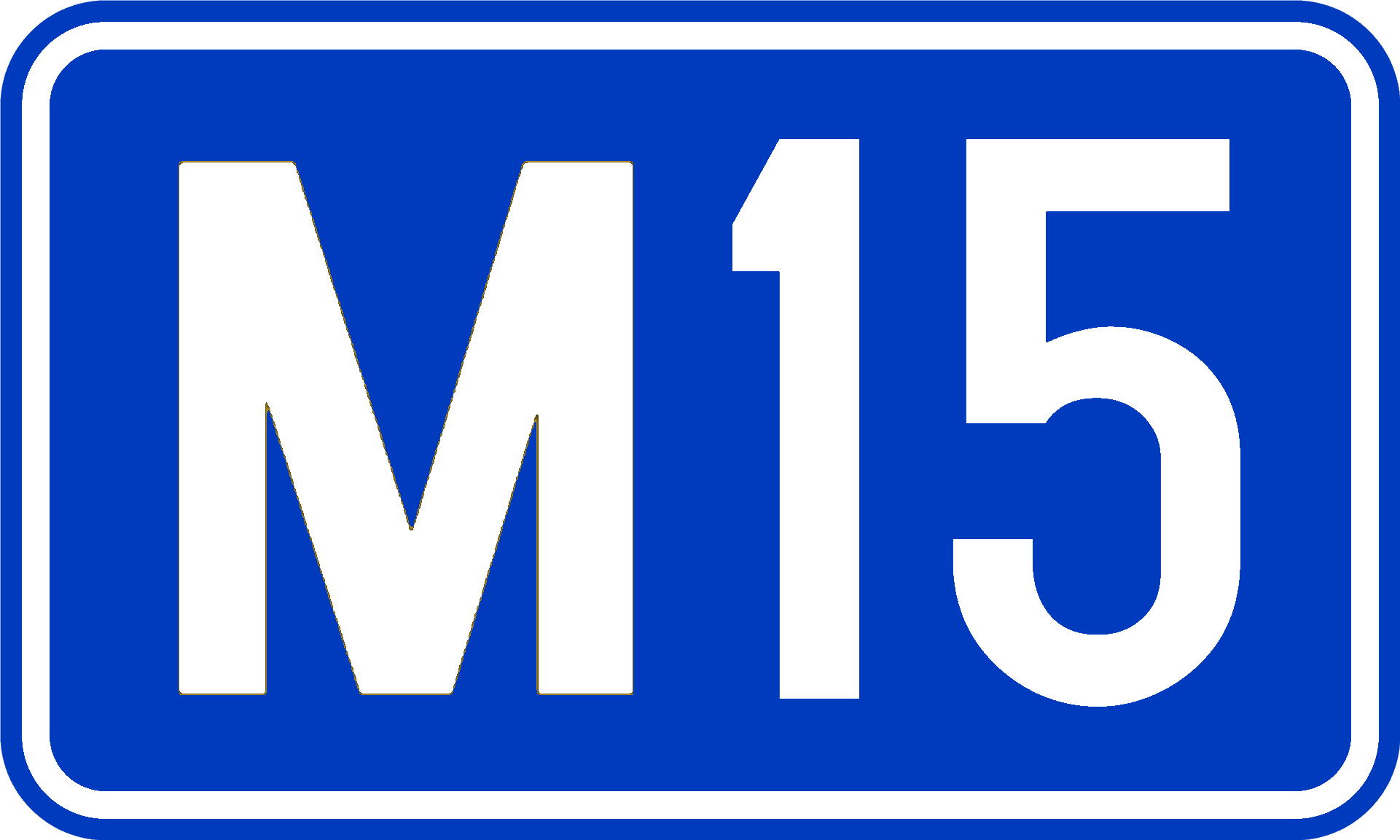
- From: M15 near Kragujevac
- 183 at Kragujevac; 25 at Kragujevac; 177 at Kragujevac; 46 at Ravni Gaj; 187 at Vitanovac; 260 near Vitanovac
- To: 22 / E761 at Kraljevo

Location
- Country: Serbia
- Districts: Šumadija, Raška

Highway system
- Roads in Serbia; Motorways
← 23	→ 25

State Road 24 is an IB-class road in central Serbia, connecting Kragujevac with Kraljevo. It is located in Šumadija and Western Serbia.

Before the new road categorization regulation given in 2013, the route wore the following names: M 1.11, M 23 and M 23.1 (before 2012) / 15 and 16 (after 2012).

The existing route is a main road with two traffic lanes, except for Batočina – Kragujevac section which is partially built by expressway standards, and defined in the Space Plan of Republic of Serbia.

In 2024, the expressway portion of State Road 24 between Jovanovac and Batočina was transferred to the new M15 expressway, being part of the new expressway system with ongoing construction to replace the state road further to Dragobrača.

== Sections ==
Section number	Length	Distance	Section name
02401	0.585 km (0.364 mi)	0.585 km (0.364 mi)	Batočina interchange – Batočina
02403	6.6 km (4.1 mi)/9.557 km (5.938 mi)	24.325 km (15.115 mi)	Jovanovac – Kragujevac
02404	2.007 km (1.247 mi)/0.914 km (0.568 mi)	26.332 km (16.362 mi)	Kragujevac – Kragujevac (Cerovac)
02405	1.199 km (0.745 mi)	27.531 km (17.107 mi)	Kragujevac (Cerovac) – Kragujevac (Divostin)
02406	15.513 km (9.639 mi)	43.044 km (26.746 mi)	Kragujevac (Divostin) – Ravni Gaj
02407	25.777 km (16.017 mi)	68.821 km (42.763 mi)	Ravni Gaj – Vitanovac
02408	6.576 km (4.086 mi)	75.397 km (46.850 mi)	Vitanovac – Kraljevo (Kamidžora)

== See also ==
- Roads in Serbia
- M15 expressway
- National Road (M)1.11
- National Road (M)23
- National Road (M)23.1
