= Aerodrom Municipality =

Aerodrom Municipality may refer to:

- Aerodrom Municipality, Skopje, a municipality of the city of Skopje, North Macedonia
- Aerodrom, Kragujevac, a former city municipality of the city of Kragujevac, Serbia
