= M15 expressway (Serbia) =

Road in Serbia

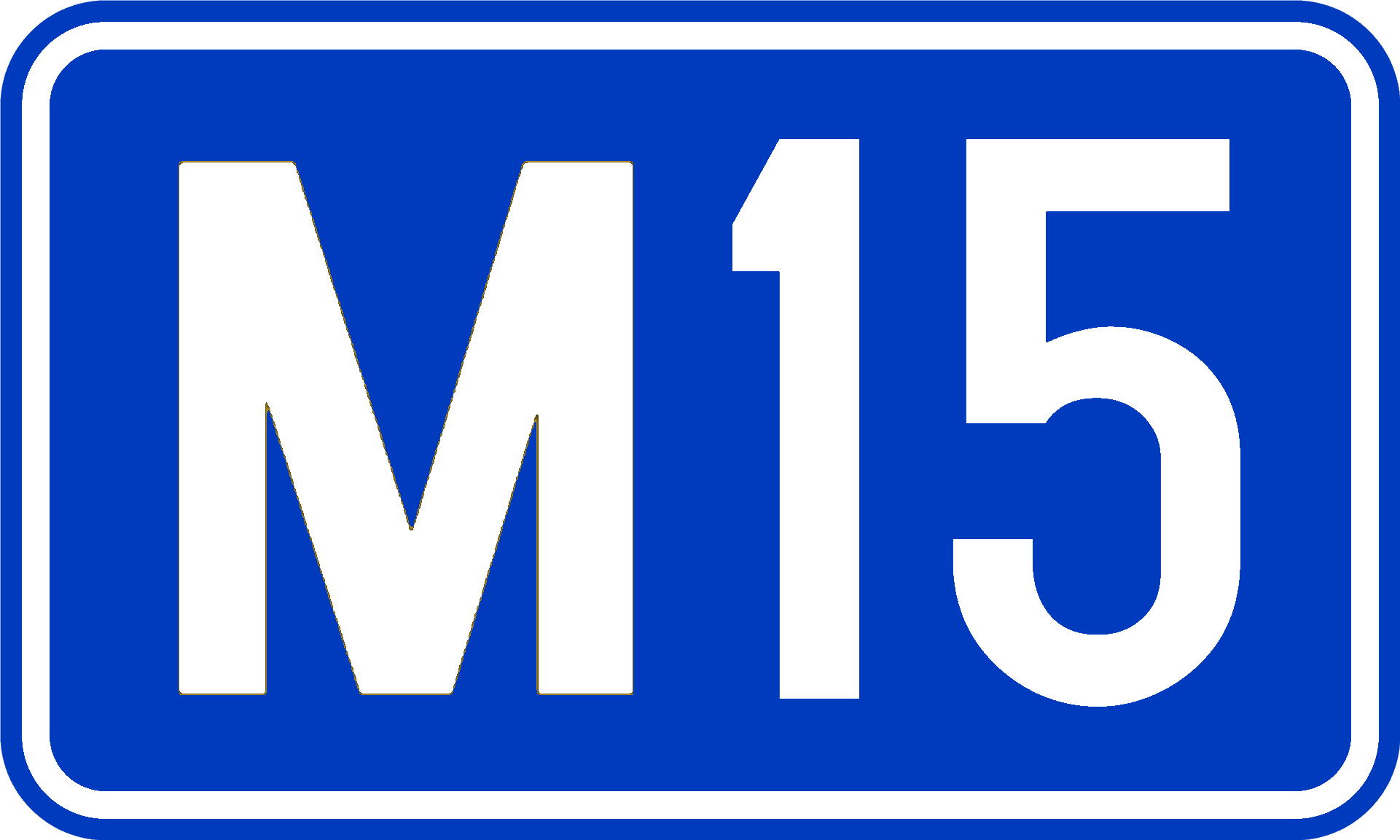
M15 expressway
- Serbian: Državni put IM reda 15; Serbian Cyrillic: Државни пут IМ reda 15
- Map as of July 2026

Route information
- Length: 18.909 km (11.750 mi)

Major junctions
- From: A1 at Batočina
- 158 at Batočina
- To: 24 at Kragujevac

Location
- Country: Serbia

Highway system
- Roads in Serbia; Motorways

The M15 expressway (Serbian: Брзи пут M15 / Brzi put M15) is an expressway in Serbia, that links the A1 motorway with Kragujevac at the State Road 24. The section between Kragujevac and Cvetojevac has three lanes (including emergency lane) in each direction, while the rest of the route has two lanes in each direction.

== Route ==
The construction of this route spanned over 16 years, being fully completed in October 2020.

| Section | Length | Status |
|---|---|---|
| Kragujevac – Cvetojevac | 7.5 km | In service (since 2007) |
| Cvetojevac – Žirovnica | 5.6 km | In service (since 2017) |
| Žirovnica – Gradac | 3 km | In service (since 2014) |
| Gradac – Batočina, | 8 km | In service (since 2020) |

== See also ==
- Roads in Serbia
- State Road 24
