= Pajazitovo =

Coordinates: 44°06′N 20°47′E

Pajazitovo Пајазитово (Serbian)
- Village (Selo)
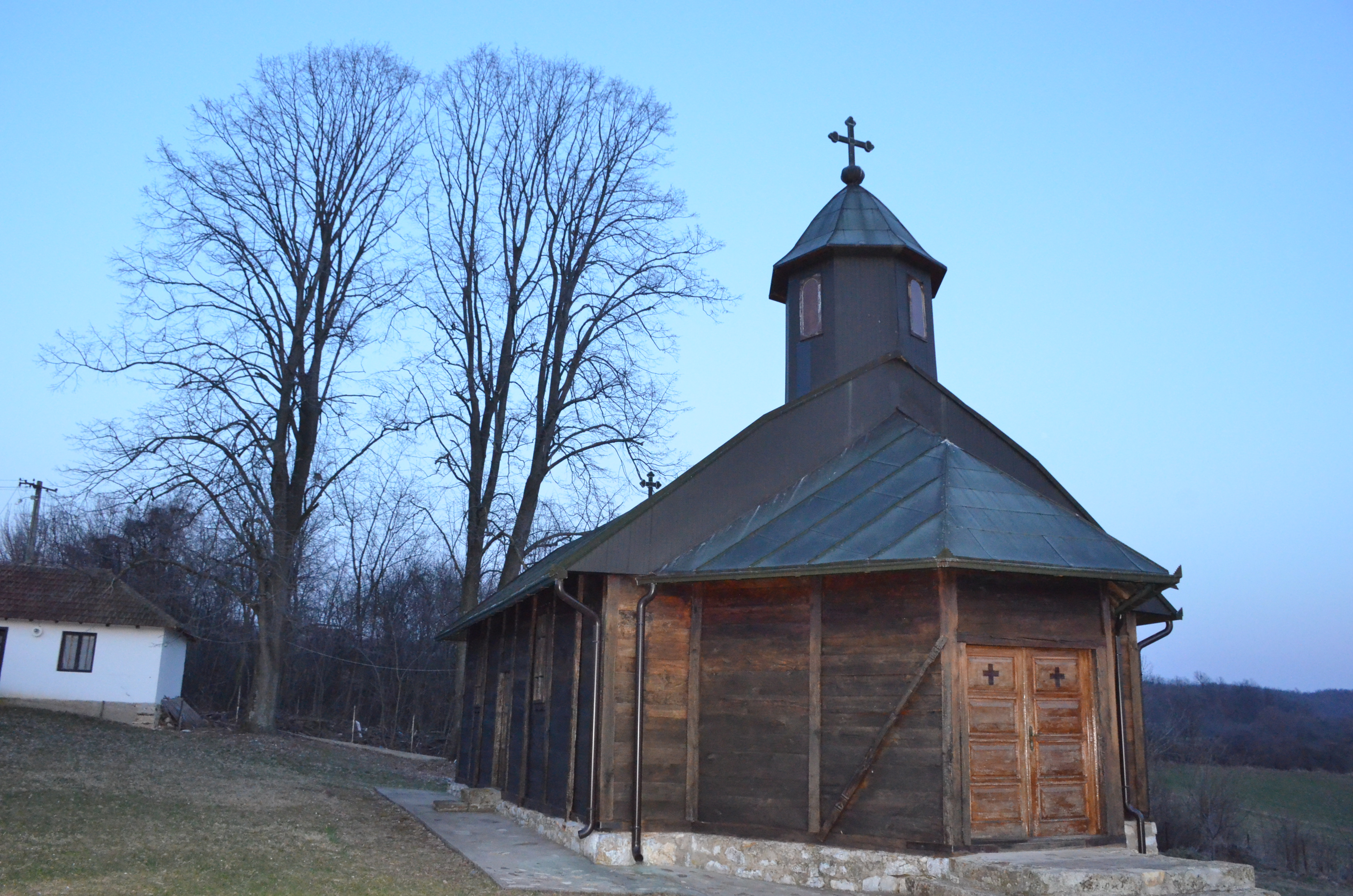
- Interactive map of Pajazitovo
- Country: Serbia
- District: Šumadija
- Municipality: Aerodrom

Population (2002)
  - Total: 241
- Time zone: UTC+1 (CET)
  - Summer (DST): UTC+2 (CEST)

Pajazitovo (Serbian: Пајазитово) is a village in the municipality of Aerodrom, Serbia. According to the 2002 census, the village has a population of 241 people.

The Serbian Point of Inaccessibility (the furthest point from any border) is very close to the village of Pajazitovo.
