= Poskurice =

Poskurice Поскурице (Serbian)
- Village (Selo)
- Location within Serbia
- Coordinates: 44°02′46″N 20°50′59″E
- Country: Serbia
- District: Šumadija
- Municipality: Aerodrom

Population (2002)
  - Total: 573
- Time zone: UTC+1 (CET)
  - Summer (DST): UTC+2 (CEST)

Poskurice (Serbian: Поскурице) is a village in the municipality of Aerodrom, Serbia. According to the 2002 census, the village has a population of 573 people.
