= Desimirovac =

Desimirovac Десимировац (Serbian)
- Village
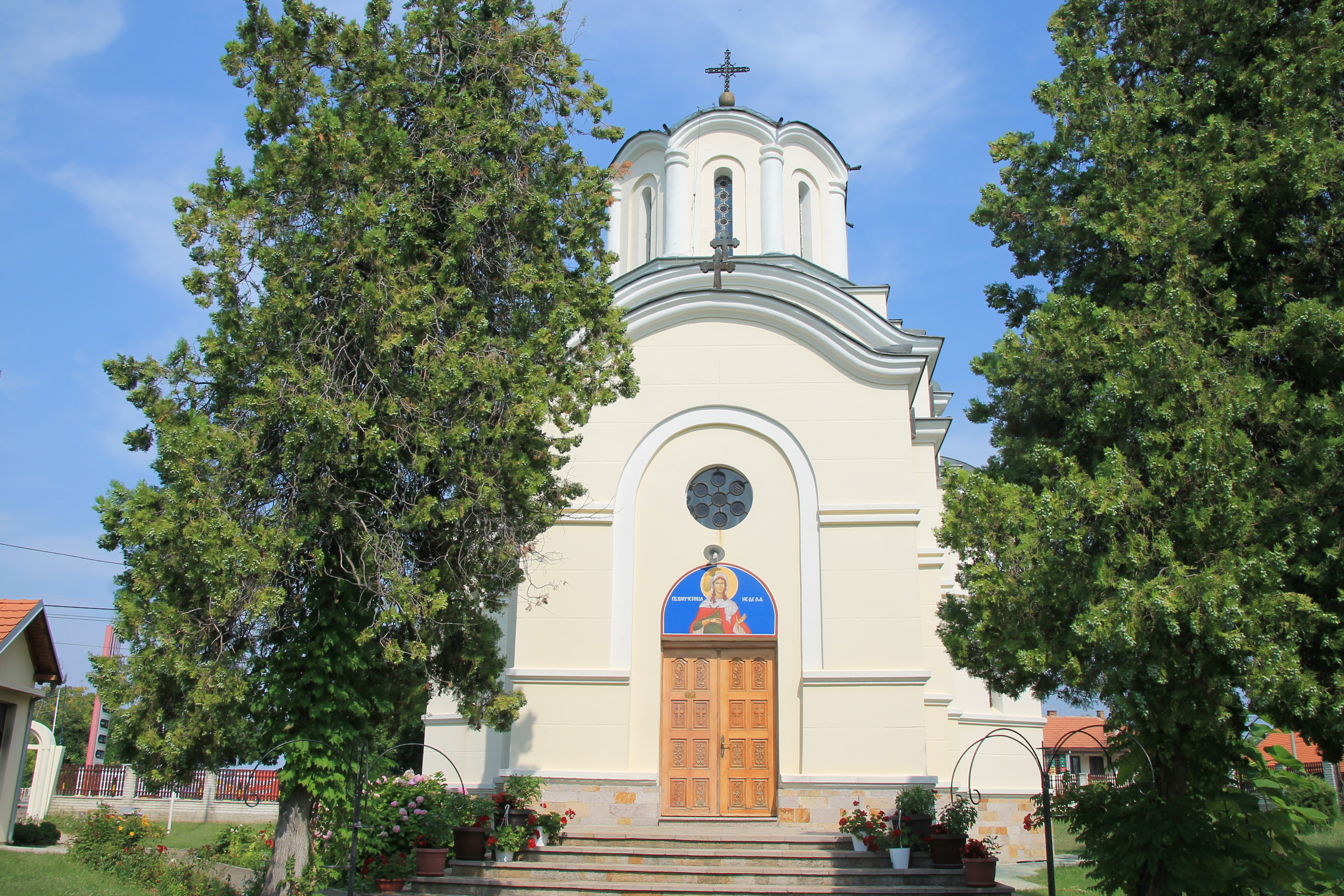

- Location within Serbia
- Coordinates: 44°05′N 20°53′E
- Country: Serbia
- District: Šumadija
- Municipality: Aerodrom

Population (2002)
  - Total: 1,401
- Time zone: UTC+1 (CET)
  - Summer (DST): UTC+2 (CEST)

Desimirovac (Serbian Cyrillic: Десимировац) Is a village in the municipality of Aerodrom, Serbia. According to the 2002 census, the village has a population of 1,401 people.
