= Gornje Jarušice =

Gornje Jarušice Горње Јарушице (Serbian)
- Village
- Location within Serbia
- Coordinates: 44°08′N 20°52′E
- Country: Serbia
- District: Šumadija
- Municipality: Aerodrom

Population (2002)
  - Total: 655
- Time zone: UTC+1 (CET)
  - Summer (DST): UTC+2 (CEST)

Gornje Jarušice (Serbian: Горње Јарушице) is a village in the municipality of Aerodrom, Serbia. According to the 2002 census, the village has a population of 655 people.
