= Mali Šenj =

Coordinates: 44°06′N 20°47′E

Mali Šenj Мали Шењ (Serbian)
- Village (Selo)
- Interactive map of Mali Šenj
- Country: Serbia
- District: Šumadija
- Municipality: Aerodrom

Population (2002)
  - Total: 100
- Time zone: UTC+1 (CET)
  - Summer (DST): UTC+2 (CEST)

Mali Šenj (Serbian: Мали Шењ) is a village in the municipality of Aerodrom, Serbia. According to the 2002 census, the village has a population of 100 people.
