= Čumić =

Čumić Чумић (Serbian)
- Village
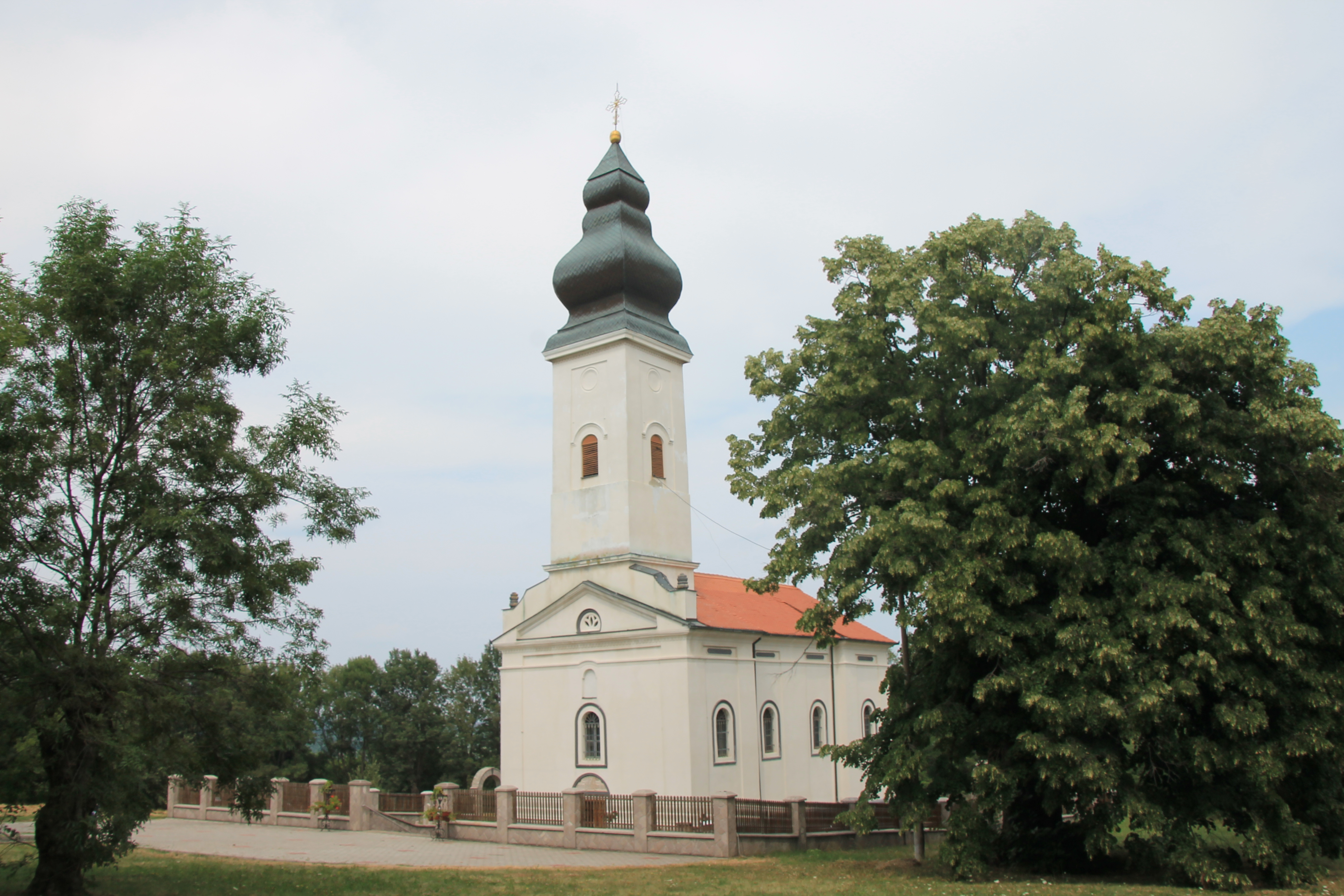

- Location within Serbia
- Coordinates: 44°09′N 20°47′E
- Country: Serbia
- District: Šumadija
- Municipality: Aerodrom

Population (2002)
  - Total: 1,600
- Time zone: UTC+1 (CET)
  - Summer (DST): UTC+2 (CEST)

Čumić (Serbian: Чумић) is a village in the municipality of Aerodrom, Serbia. According to the 2002 census, the village has a population of 1,600.

== Demographics ==
1,351 adults live in the settlement of Čumić, and the average age of the population is 45.8 years (44.3 for men and 47.2 for women). There are 458 households in the settlement, and the average number of members per household is 3.49.

This settlement is largely inhabited by Serbs (according to the 2002 census), and in the last three censuses, a decrease in the number of inhabitants was observed.
