= Resnik, Kragujevac =

Resnik Ресник (Serbian)
- Village
- Location within Serbia
- Coordinates: 44°07′N 20°57′E
- Country: Serbia
- District: Šumadija
- City: Kragujevac

Population (2011)
  - Total: 1,080
- Time zone: UTC+1 (CET)
  - Summer (DST): UTC+2 (CEST)

Resnik (Serbian: Ресник) is a village in the city area of Kragujevac, Serbia. According to the 2011 census, the village has a population of 1,080 people.
