= Mali Požarevac =

- Village
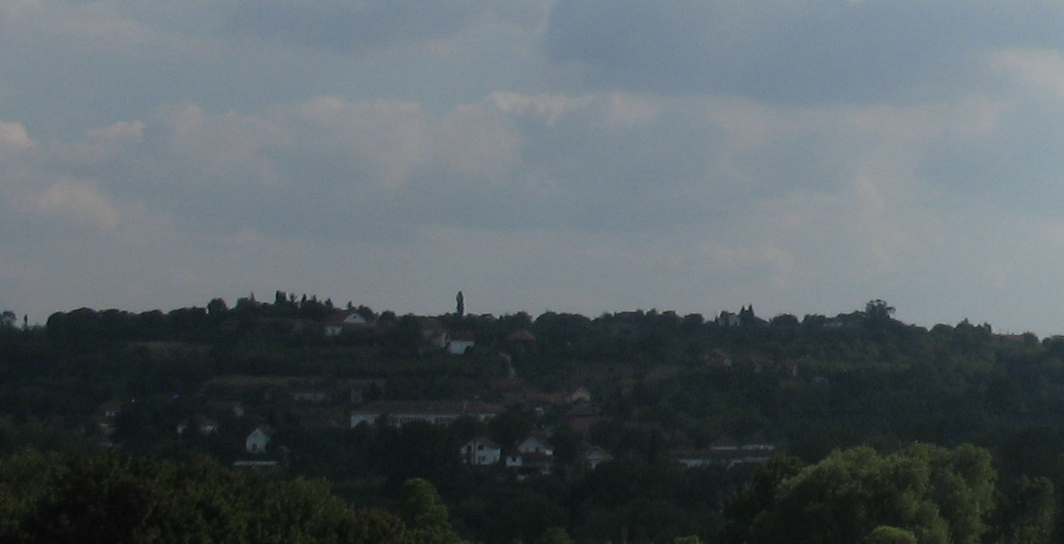

- Location within Serbia
- Coordinates: 44°33′N 20°39′E
- Country: Serbia
- District: Belgrade District
- City Municipality: Sopot

Population (2022)
  - Total: ▼1,287
- Time zone: UTC+1 (CET)
  - Summer (DST): UTC+2 (CEST)

Mali Požarevac (Serbian Cyrillic: Мали Пожаревац) is a village located in the municipality of Belgrade, Serbia. According to the 2022 census, the village has a population of 1287 inhabitants.
