= Opornica =

Opornica Опорница (Serbian)
- Village (Selo)
- Location within Serbia
- Coordinates: 44°03′N 20°53′E
- Country: Serbia
- Time zone: UTC+1 (CET)
  - Summer (DST): UTC+2 (CEST)

Opornica (Serbian: Опорница) is a small Serbian village in the metropolitan region of Kragujevac, in the Šumadija District. It is located on the Kragujevac-Topola road, which is the principal route to Belgrade.

The settlement was founded in 1815.

== Demographics ==
As of 2022, the total population is 630, and the average age is 42.38 years. The village has 131 households, with the average number of 3.45 persons per household. According to the census of 2002, this village is highly inhabited by persons of Serbian descent.
