= Šumarice =

Šumarice Шумарице (Serbian)
- Village (Selo)
- Location within Serbia
- Coordinates: 43°43′N 20°46′E
- Country: Serbia
- District: Raška District
- Municipality: Kraljevo
- Time zone: UTC+1 (CET)
  - Summer (DST): UTC+2 (CEST)

Šumarice (Serbian Cyrillic: Шумарице) is a village situated in Serbia's Kraljevo municipality. It has about 500 residents and is located about 4 kilometres (2.5 mi) from the city of Kraljevo.

This Šumarice should not be confused with the suburb of Kragujevac (also Šumarice), which is the site of the October in Kragujevac Memorial Park, which commemorates the Kragujevac massacre.
