= Cerovac (Kragujevac) =

Cerovac Церовац (Serbian)
- Village
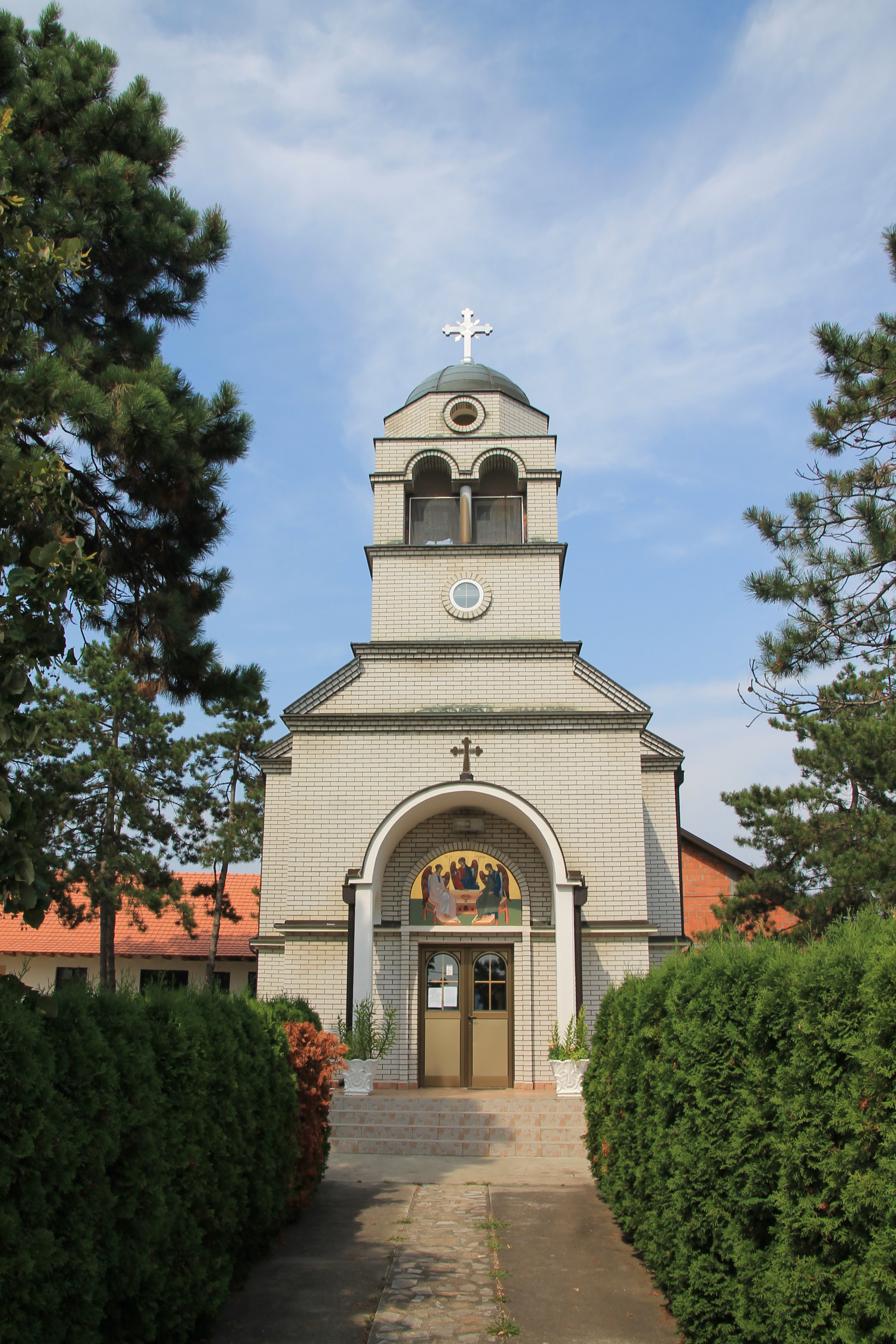

- Location within Serbia
- Coordinates: 44°06′N 20°51′E
- Country: Serbia
- District: Šumadija
- City: Kragujevac

Population (2002)
  - Total: 904
- Time zone: UTC+1 (CET)
  - Summer (DST): UTC+2 (CEST)

Cerovac (Serbian: Церовац) is a village in the city of Kragujevac, Serbia and the district of Šumadija. According to the 2002 census, the village has a population of 904 people. Between 2002 and 2008, Cerovac was part of the now-defunct Aerodrom urban municipality of Kragujevac.

An elementary school was founded in the last decade of the 19th century. The village has a church (Orthodox), a community centre, hotels, shops and a market.
