= Aleksa Nenadović =

Serbian ober knyaz

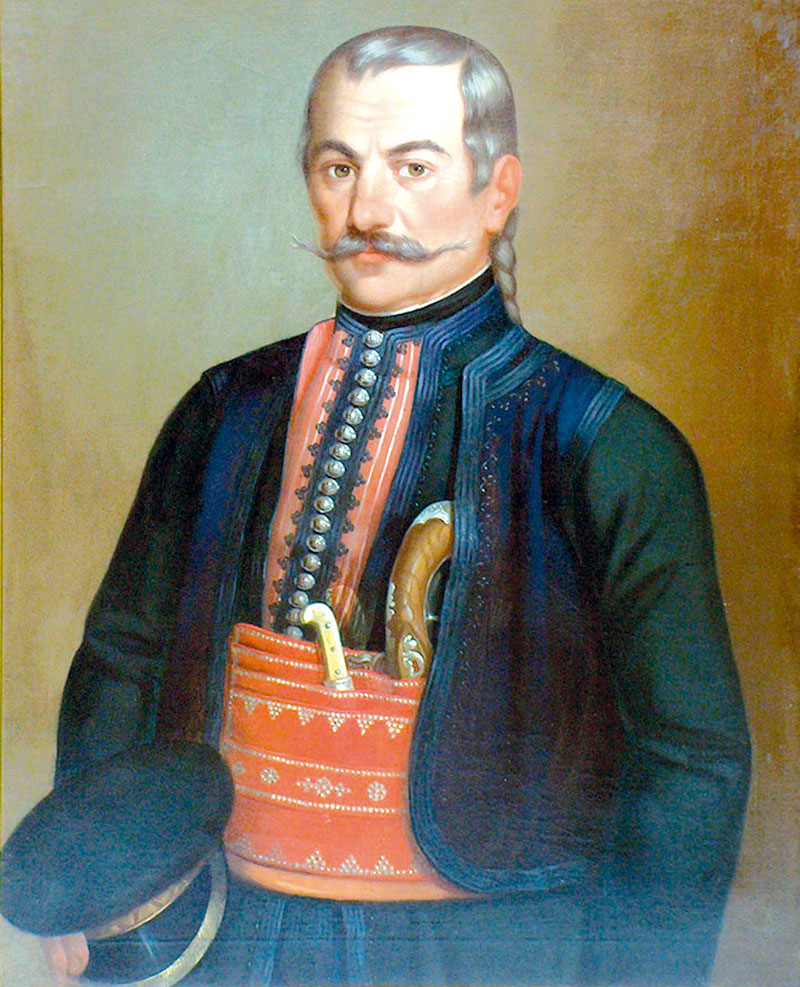
- Painting by Uroš Knežević, 1855.
- Born: 1747; Brankovina, Sanjak of Smederevo
- Died: 4 February 1804 (aged 56–57); Valjevo, Sanjak of Smederevo
- Cause of death: Executed by decapitation along with Ilija Birčanin
- Occupations: obor-knez of Tamnava–Posavina knežina, knez, Austrian volunteer, militia leader

Aleksa Nenadović (Serbian: Алекса Ненадовић, 1749–4 February 1804) was a Serb militia commander and obor-knez (Christian mayor) of the Tamnava–Posavina knežina of the Valjevo nahiya of the Pashalik of Belgrade. A veteran of the Serbian Free Corps that fought in the Austro-Turkish War (1788–1791), he became one of the leading Serbs in the province, and was killed by the renegade Janissaries in the event known as the "Slaughter of the Knezes", which led to the First Serbian Uprising (1804–13) and Serbian Revolution.

His younger brother was Jakov Nenadović, a vojvoda (general) and the first Serbian Interior Minister. His sons were archpriest and one of the main leaders in the uprising, Matija Nenadović, and vojvoda Sima Nenadović, active in the Second Serbian Uprising (1815–17).

== Life ==
=== Early life ===
Aleksa Nenadović was born in Brankovina, a village in the Tamnava srez of the Valjevo nahija. His birth year was 1747 according to Viennese military documents. His father was Stevan (thus, his patronymic was Stevanović), his grandfather Petko, and great-grandfather knez Stanoje, whose father had settled Brankovina from Birač (in Old Herzegovina), migrating together with his clan, the Nenadović, which had bad blood with the local Turks. Upon crossing the Drina, the Nenadović clan split into four (belonging to two families, the Lazarević and Stevanović), the first settled below the Cer at Lipolist in Mačva and were beekeepers, becoming rich in honey trade, the second in the Valjevo nahija of which the Birčani family lived in the Suvodanje village by the Medvednik, the third in Grabovac (towards Belgrade) called the Stevanović, and the fourth, the Stevanović-Nenadović who settled at the empty location that would become Brankovina. Aleksa had a younger brother, Jakov (born 1765), a pig trader. He married Jovana Đelmašević from Gvozdenović, with whom he had six sons and three daughters.

=== Austro-Turkish War ===
The Ottomans declared war on Russia in 1787 and Austria joined the next year. As in earlier wars, Austria counted on the cooperation of Serbs. The Serbian Free Corps was established with a Serb refugee manpower and Austrian and Serb officers under the main commander Mihailo Mihaljević. The first months of the war were concentrated on the Serbs readying the terrain for the Austrian main army.

Aleksa had prior to the war received Austrian pamphlets which he threw inside the windows of mosques. There were over 3000 Muslim houses and 24 mosques and 200 Christian houses in Valjevo. He was still armed and tasked by the unknowing Valjevo Turks to protect the nearby Sava river border with 100 pandurs in case the Austrians invaded. In December 1787 the Austrians had managed to steal Ottoman boats from the Danube and Sava. In the winter of 1787–88, a trio of Serbian youngsters who had left in 1786 to train in Austrian Sremska Kamenica crossed over with gunpowder and a drum and told Aleksa that they were sent on behalf of the Austrian emperor to rally the Serbs to fight the Ottomans until the Austrian army arrives. Aleksa told the Turk patrol that the Austrians already had crossed, which caused panic in Valjevo. He then messaged four associates to gather bands and await the signal to attack Valjevo. Serbs put up sentinels and sent their families into the hills, while the Turks sent theirs to Užice, Soko and cross the Drina.

On 28 February 1788 Valjevo was attacked by Serbian bands from three sides, with the Turks engaging them by the river where their commander Omerica was killed, at the same time Aleksa's two associates entered Valjevo from the fourth empty side, put houses on fire and forced the remaining Turks to flee to Čačak and Užice. The Turks were pursued towards Čačak where 27 Serb soldiers were killed, the Turks from Čačak and Valjevo were driven away and Čačak was set on fire. Aleksa went to the Fenek Monastery and informed Austrian emperor Joseph II about their operations and received 100 ducats and the promise of military aid. That same day he met with Austrian major Mihailo Mihaljević who gave instructions on readying the people for war. Aleksa assembled bands in Valjevo and was sent a fähnrich and 30 freikorps by Mihaljević. A bridge was built over the Sava at Pobrežje by Mihaljević who arrived in March 1788 and also set up a trench, and gave the order that the families between Medvednik and Morava be moved to Austrian territory if they were in any conflict with Turks. Austrian major Despot Lukić from Slavonia built a trench at Kličevac and gathered 1,800 men from the area, who fought the Turks in the mountains. Mihaljević gathered the Free Corps in Jagodina and Aleksa took the Valjevo militia there to train. After training in Jagodina, they returned to Kličevac and continued training there. A Turk band from Bačevci kidnapped seven from Zlatarić, the Serb Valjevo bands then answered by taking 70 and killing their leader in Bačevci on 4 July.

Koča Anđelković from the Jagodina area fought the Turks in Pomoravlje, and distinguished himself to such degree that the liberated territories of central Serbia came to be known as "Koča's Frontier". In the prelude of the war Koča had joined the Serbian četa (guerrilla band) under the command of Radič Petrović, and his comrade was a young Karađorđe. Upon the outbreak of war, Koča served in an Austrian detachment that attacked Smederevo, he then formed his own detachment which attacked and took over Požarevac, then Smederevska Palanka, Batočina, Bagrdan and Kragujevac. Koča's detachment numbered some 500 at one point. The Austrians took over Šabac (16 April 1788, with Serb help), Smederevo and attacked Soko but were unable to take it. In western Serbia, Aleksa cleaned the Valjevo area of Turks and pursued them to Čačak. The main agitator in western Serbia was bishop Jovan Jovanović of Bačka. Koča was promoted to captain and had the task of cutting of the Niš–Belgrade route, with up to 3,000 men under his command. He was later captured during an Ottoman offensive and impaled.

The Austrian army besieged Belgrade in 28 September–10 October 1789. When the Austrian army attacked Belgrade, Aleksa's militia of 700 men protected the Austrian army moving from Pančevo to Belgrade, and monitored the Danube so that the Ottoman army did not attack from the rear, for 15 days.

As there was insufficient support to the Serb troops and the Ottomans closed in on Belgrade (which resulted in 50,000 Serb refugees in Austria) and proceeded to Banat, the two powers concluded a truce until summer 1789, with the war concluding with the Treaty of Sistova on 4 August 1791.

=== Hadji Mustafa Pasha and Janissaries ===
Aleksa had business relations with the Vizier of Belgrade, Hadji Mustafa Pasha (r. 1793–1801), and was a friend of merchant Petar Ičko who saved his life once. The Porte gave the Serbs local self-governing rights, including the appointment of rural knez and obor-knez. Aleksa was a knez in the Tamnava knežina. Mustafa Pasha had established a Serbian militia to fight against the rebellious Janissaries and rebel leader Osman Pazvantoğlu of the Sanjak of Vidin. While Mustafa Pasha was appointed beylerbey of Rumelia in 1797 and sent to Plovdiv to fight Pazvantoğlu, the Janissaries and Pazvantoğlu quickly attacked and defeated the Serbian militia and Mustafa Pasha's army near Požarevac and proceeded to take the Belgrade town. Serbian chiefs (titled obor-knez) of the Valjevo nahija combined their forces at the end of November 1797 and prior to Orthodox Christmas decisively defeated the Janissaries who retreated to Smederevo. The Janissaries murdered militia commander Stanko Arambašić and knez Ranko Lazarević, while Aleksa survived attempts. Mustafa Pasha was murdered in December 1801 by the Janissaries who wrested control of the Pashalik, becoming known as the Dahije.

Aleksa had written a letter to Austrian officer Paul von Mitesser in Zemun regarding plans for an uprising against the Dahije, which they however intercepted. The Dahije now ordered their mütesellim to murder chosen notable Serbs on a coming specific date. Dahije leader Mehmed-aga Fočić sent for Aleksa, Ilija Birčanin and Nikola Grbović to ready lodging and food for the hunt of his 200 men in Valjevo and Šabac. Unknowing, Aleksa, Birčanin and Nikola Grbović's son Milovan Grbović met up with Fočić at the Lubenica field and then turned to Valjevo, where they were captured and put in heavy chains in the dungeon. Upon hearing this, Aleksa's brother Jakov gathered some serfs and Živko Dabić to meet with the elder Turks of Valjevo, who respected Aleksa and Birčanin, and negotiate with Fočić about their release. Fočić demanded payment for their "not receiving him well, not readying lodging", which Jakov gathered some and loaned the rest from the Valjevo Turks. The Turks were informed that Fočić would steal the payment and kill all chiefs so they told Jakov that they would have the payment ready the next day. The Nenadović family gathered all their belongings to give to Fočić so that he wouldn't change his mind that night about releasing them. The next day Milovan Grbović was released and Aleksa Nenadović and Ilija Birčanin brought to execution. Aleksa turned to speak to the gathered people but was interrupted by Fočić who ordered the executioner to cut, first Ilija, and then Aleksa, who survived the first dull blow. Fočić put the severed heads on display at his house.

After three days and begging of Valjevans, the bodies were collected, Aleksa's by Manojlo from Kličevac, buried by the Brankovina church. Aleksa's head was stolen by Fočić's servant Živan Jerotić from Blizonje and given to be buried by his family. His family later put a headstone by his grave that says "here lies the bones of Aleksa Stev. Nenadović, cut down by Dahija Fočić in Valjevo 23 January 1804". In the days of 23–29 January the Dahije killed many notable Serbs in the event known as the "Slaughter of the Knezes" which triggered the First Serbian Uprising.

== See also ==
- List of Serbian Revolutionaries

== Sources ==
- Ćorović, Vladimir (2001) [1997]. "Кочина крајина; Зачеци устанка у Србији; Почетак устанка у Србији". Историја српског народа (in Serbian). Belgrade: Јанус.
- Gavrilović, Andra (1904). "Сеча кнезова". Црте из историје ослобођења Србије. Belgrade: Нздање дворске књпжаре Мпте Стајпћа у Београду. pp. 7–42. (Public Domain)
- Krstić, Milivoje (1994). "Прилог проучавању фрајкора у ваљевском крају" (PDF). Гласник. 28–29. Valjevo: Историјски архив: 101–113.
- Nenadović, Konstantin N. (1903) [1883]. Живот и дела великог Ђорђа Петровића Кара-Ђорђа. Vol. I (2 ed.). Belgrade: Штампа Савића и Комп.
- Pavlović, Dragoljub M. (1910). Србија за време последњег аустријско-турског рата: 1788-1791 г. Српска краљевска академија.

Preceded by	knez of Tamnava; 1793–1804	Succeeded by Jakov Nenadović
