= Rakri =

Rakri may refer to:

- Rakri, Madhya Pradesh, a village in Rewa district, Madhya Pradesh
- Rakri, Punjab, a census town in Hoshiarpur district, Punjab, India
- Rakri, Uttar Pradesh, a village in Mainpuri district, Uttar Pradesh
- Raksha Bandhan

== See also ==
- Rakari
