= Serbian Free Corps =

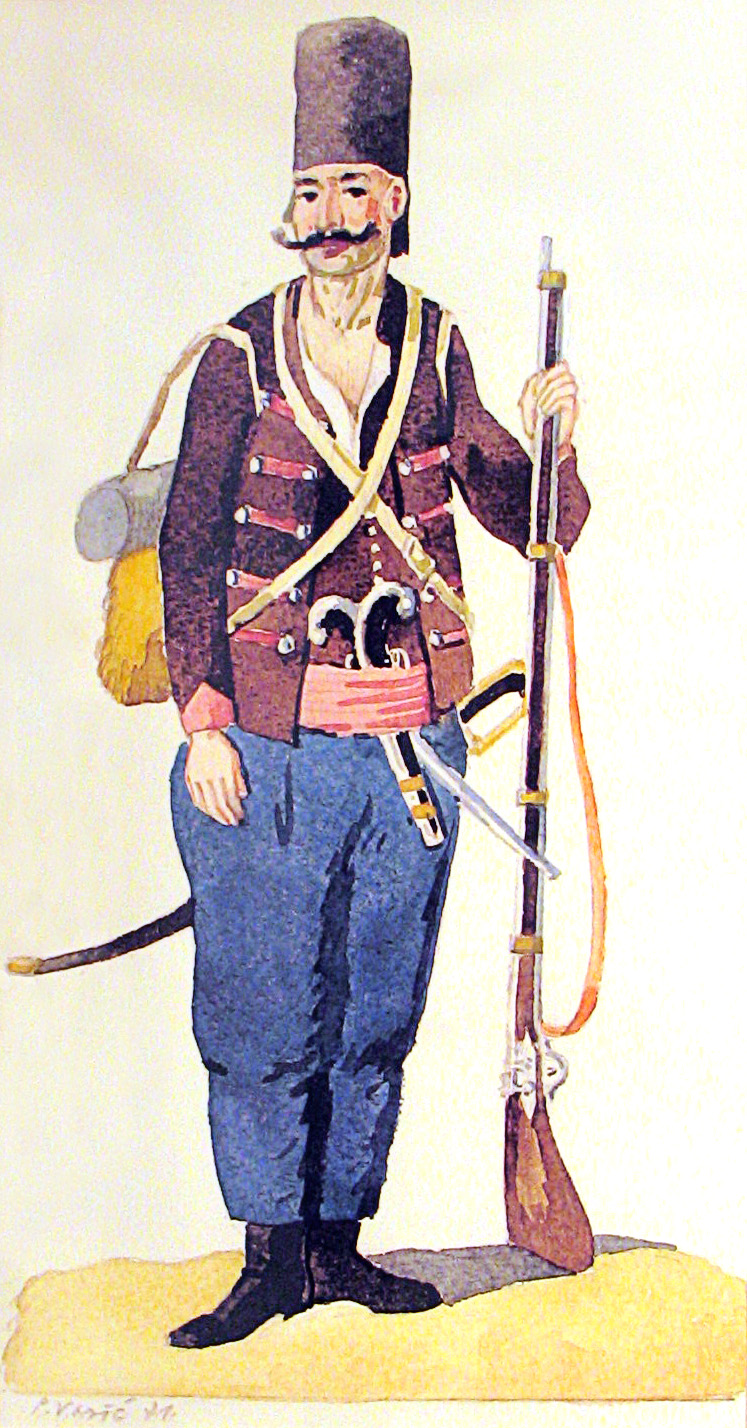
- Illustration of a volunteer
- Active: 1787 — 1791
- Disbanded: 1791 (Treaty of Sistova)
- Country: Habsburg monarchy
- Allegiance: Habsburg Monarchy
- Role: Serbian liberation and unification with the Habsburg Monarchy
- Size: 5–8,000
- Garrison/HQ: In Banat Military Frontier
- Nickname: frajkori
- Engagements: Austro-Turkish War (1787–91): Siege of Belgrade (1789)

Commanders
- Main commander: Mihailo Mihaljević, major
- Notable commanders: Koča Anđelković Stanko Arambašić and Radič Petrović

The Serbian Free Corps (German: Serbische Freikorps), known simply as frajkori (Serbian Cyrillic: фрајкори), was a volunteer militia composed of ethnic Serbs, established by the Habsburg monarchy, to fight the Ottoman Empire during the Austro-Turkish War (1787–1791). The rebellion in the Sanjak of Smederevo and militia's operations resulted in the period of Habsburg-occupied Serbia, which took place from 1788 to 1791. Ultimately, the Serbian volunteer corps had the legacy of promoting the creation of future paramilitaries, such as Hadji Mustafa Pasha's Serb militia and the Serbian rebel army during the First Serbian Uprising.

== History ==
A Serbian freikorps of 5,000 soldiers had been established in Banat (Banat Military Frontier), composed of refugees that had fled earlier conflicts in the Ottoman Empire. The Corps would fight for liberation of Serbia and unification under Habsburg rule. The main commander was the Austrian major Mihailo Mihaljević. There were several freikorps along the Habsburg-Ottoman frontier. Mihaljević's Free Corps, the most notable, was active from Šumadija to Podrinje, and across the Morava there was the Braničevo Free Corps; in Croatia the St. George Free Corps; in Bosnia they were called Seressaner. Other Serb militias were the Kozara Militia and Prosar Militia, established in Bosnia in 1788, composed of 1,000 soldiers each.

Among volunteers were Aleksa Nenadović and Karađorđe Petrović, Stanko Arambašić and the prominent Radič Petrović and most distinguished of all, Koča Anđelković. The Orthodox clergy in Serbia supported the rebellion.

Koča's militia quickly took over Palanka and Batočina, attacked Kragujevac, and reached the Constantinople road, cutting off the Ottoman army from Sanjak of Niš and Sanjak of Vidin.

The Austrians used the Corps in two failed attempts to seize Belgrade, in late 1787 and early 1788.

On Trinity Sunday 1790, the freikorps of Radič and Karađorđe attacked Ottoman troops at Dragačevo and Požega. There were many hajduks alongside Radič and Karađorđe, only Karađorđe had up to 100 with him. Upon the truce, the two parted, and subsequently the hajduks and Free Corps dispersed into armed bands (čete) that ravaged in the Belgrade Pashalik. The Serbian Free Corps was dispersed on 16 October 1790. After the disbandment of the Serbian Free Corps, the Habsburg government offered distinguished soldiers to cross over. Radič moved to Srem, while Karađorđe went into the woods as a hajduk.

== Organization ==
- Serbian Free Corps, under the command of Mihailo Mihaljević
  - Banat Free Corps (est. in prelude of war)
    - Branovački (German: Branovaczky) detachment, under the command of Jovan Branovački, joined into Koča's detachment in 1788 early, adjoined by it in late 1788
    - Reber detachment, 300 men
  - Syrmia Free Corps (est. in prelude of war), under the command of Mihailo Mihaljević
  - Serb volunteer detachments (est. in 1788)
    - Koča's detachment (Кочин одред/Kočin odred), 500 men, guerrillas mustered from Resava, Kragujevac, Smederevo and Jagodina, joined into Branovački in late 1788
    - Valjevo militia, under the command of Aleksa Nenadović
  - Braničevo Free Corps
  - Kozara militia, 1,000 men
  - Prosar militia, 1,000 men
  - Serbian–Slavonian Free Corps (est. in 1792), under the command of Mihaljević fought in French Revolutionary Wars

According to a document from 6 November 1789, the Free Corps included:

- 1 squadron of hussars,
- 18 companies of fusiliers,
- and 4 companies of musketeers,

with a total of 5,049 soldiers.

== Dress ==
Their uniforms were similar to that of the frontiersmen, with some changes.

== Aftermath and legacy ==
In 1793, the Austrians established the new free corps on the border, for Serbians and Bosnians.

On the eve of the First Serbian Uprising, the Užice and Sokol nahije established volunteer detachments, called frajkori, that had the task of sabotage against Ottoman military plans, and their concentration in this region of Serbia.

== Notable people ==
- Mihailo Mihaljević (1748–1794), oberlieutenant (March 1788)
- Aleksa Nenadović (1749–1804), oberstleutnant. Killed in the Slaughter of the Knezes.
- Lazar Ilić (1749-?), oberstleutnant, from Jabučje.
- Koča Anđelković (c. 1755–1788), hauptmann †
- Radič Petrović (1738–1816), hauptmann, later Serbian Revolutionary vojvoda
- Vuča Žikić (fl. 1787–d. 1808), hauptmann, later Serbian Revolutionary kapetan.
- Petar Čardaklija (fl. 1787–d. 1808), hauptmann, later Serbian Revolutionary diplomat.
- Jovan Čardaklija, later Serbian Revolutionary captain.
- Pavle Sokolović (1754–1789), hauptmann, from Vršac †
- Petar Jeremić-Rakarac (1748–1795), leutnant, from Rakari.
- Milisav Milošević (1748–1806), leutnant, from Orašac, later fought the French, Serbian Revolutionary.
- Janko Petrović, leutnant, from Oglađenovac.
- Đuka Popović (1758–?), fähnrich, priest from Petnica, later fought the French.
- Đorđe Nikolajević, priest. Later known as Deli-Đorđe.
- Nikola Radomirović, priest.
- Isailo Lazarević.
- Ivan Mislođinac.
- Miloje Todorović (1762–1832), korporal, later Serbian Revolutionary vojvoda
- Sima Marković (1768–1817), korporal, later Serbian Revolutionary vojvoda
- Karađorđe Petrović (1768–1817), stražmester, later Serbian Revolutionary commander-in-chief
- Đoka Mićanović, stražmester
- Zojić, captain.
- Nikola Vojinović, captain.
- Miloš Krajević, poručnik.
- Milić Hadžić, potporučnik.
- Jovan Dimitrijević, potporučnik.
- Trifun Tanasijević, potporučnik.
- Arsenije Andrić, potporučnik.
- Dejan, potporučnik.
- Todor Bojinović (1750s–1813), buljubaša of hajduk volunteers, later Serbian Revolutionary
- Stevan Sinđelić (1770–1809), volunteer, later Serbian Revolutionary vojvoda
- Stanko Arambašić (1764–98), soldier
- Vasa Čarapić (1768–1806), soldier, later Serbian Revolutionary vojvoda
- Jovan Petrović-Kovač (1772–1837), soldier, blacksmith for Serbian Army
- Marjan Jovanović, from Homolje.
- Aleksa Dukić, hajduk under Mihaljević, Karađorđe's bodyguard during the uprising.
- Kuzman Žikić, brother of Vuča.
- Deli-Đorđe Čiplak
- Đorđe Simić
- Jovan Branovački
- Šakabenda Nestorović, fähnrich.
- Danijel, fähnrich.
- Nedeljko Radojević, fähnrich.
- Ilija Lazarević, fähnrich.
- Uroš Veselić, fähnrich.
- Teodosije from Orašac, hajduk harambaša.
- Stanimir from Rabrovac, hajduk harambaša.
- Steka from Ratari, hajduk harambaša.
- Stanoje Crnja from Kusadak, hajduk harambaša.
- Radoje from Trnava, hajduk harambaša.
- Nikola from Štiplje, hajduk harambaša.
- Mijuško from Pčelice, hajduk harambaša.
- Mladen Milovanović from Kurilovo, hajduk harambaša.
- Petar Ratković, hajduk harambaša. Killed by Turk pursuit in Kruševac in 1791.
- Mata from Lipovac in Jasenica, hajduk harambaša. Killed in the Slaughter of the Knezes.
- Miloš from Vlastelica in Dragačevo, hajduk harambaša.
- Živko Milenković

== See also ==
- Serbian Militia
- Serbian Militia (1718–46)

== Sources ==
- Ćorović, Vladimir (2001) [1997]. "Kočina krajina". Историја српског народа (in Serbian). Belgrade: Јанус.
- Đorđević, M.; Nedeljković, S. (2015). "Политичке прилике у београдском пашалуку у предвечерје српске револуције (1787-1804)". Teme-Časopis za Društvene Nauke: 965–979.
- Krstić, Milivoje (1994). "Прилог проучавању фрајкора у ваљевском крају" (PDF). Гласник. 28–29. Valjevo: Историјски архив: 101–113.
- Milićević, Milan Đ. (1888). Поменик знаменитих људи у српског народа новијега доба [Monument to famous people among the Serbian people in modern times] (in Serbian). Издање Чупићеве задужбине.
- Nedeljković, Slaviša D.; Đorđević, Miloš Z. (2015). "Политичке прилике у београдском пашалуку у предвечерје српске револуције (1787-1804)". Teme. XXXIX (3). Niš: 965–969.
- Novaković, Stojan (1906). Tursko carstvo pred srpski ustanak, 1780–1804. Beograd Davidović – via Archive.org.
- Pavlović, Dragoljub M. (1910). Srbija za vreme poslednjeg austrijsko-turskog rata: 1788-1791 g. Srpska kraljevska akademija.
- Vukićević, Milenko M. (1907). Карађорђе (1752–1804) [Karađorđe]. Vol. 1. Државна штампарија Краљевине Србије – via Archive.org.
