= Military occupation of Serbia =

Military occupation of Serbia may refer to:

- Axis occupation of Serbia during WW2 (Serbian territory of the Kingdom of Yugoslavia under German, Croatian, Hungarian, Bulgarian and Italian occupation)
- Territory of the Military Commander in Serbia during WW2 (Serbian territory of the Kingdom of Yugoslavia under Nazi military occupation)
- Bulgarian occupation of Serbia (World War II)
- Axis occupation of Vojvodina during WW2 (Serbian province of the Kingdom of Yugoslavia under Hungarian and Croatian occupation)
- Bulgarian occupation of Serbia (World War I)
- Austro-Hungarian occupation of Serbia (Austro-Hungarian military administration of Serbia during WW1)
- Habsburg-occupied Serbia (1788–92) (Austro-Hungarian military administration of Serbia in the 18th century)
- Habsburg-occupied Serbia (1686–91) (Austro-Hungarian military administration of Serbia in the 17th century)

== See also ==
- Habsburg Serbia (disambiguation)
- Ottoman Serbia
- Hungarian occupation of Yugoslav territories during WW2
- Kosovo
