= Koča's Frontier =

Territory of the Habsburg monarchy

Koča's Frontier Кочина крајина Kočina krajina
- 1788–1791
- Flag Coat of arms

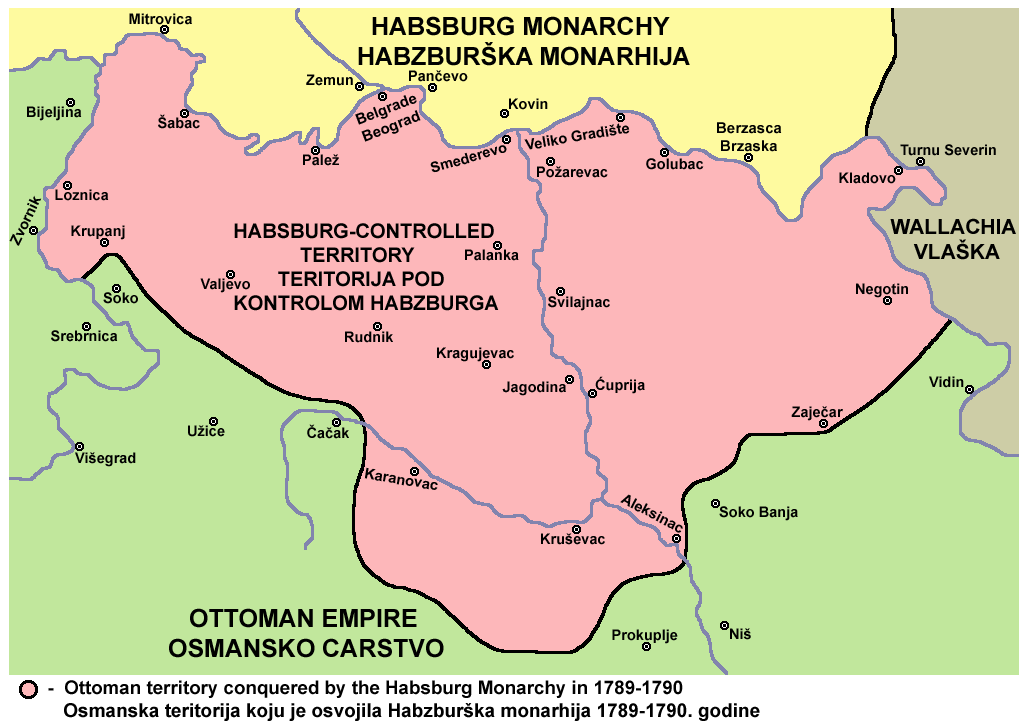
- Habsburg-controlled territory in 1789–90
- Status: Territory of the Habsburg monarchy
- Capital: Belgrade
- Common languages: Serbian, German
- Religion: Catholicism, Eastern Orthodoxy
- Government: Military administration
- Historical era: Early modern period
  - Habsburg occupation: 1788
  - Austro-Turkish War: 1788–1791
  - Treaty of Sistova: 1791
Preceded by	Succeeded by
Sanjak of Smederevo; Military Frontier	Sanjak of Smederevo

Koča's Frontier (Serbian: Кочина крајина, Kočina krajina) refers to the territory liberated by Serbian rebels in the Sanjak of Smederevo (Ottoman Empire), during the Austro-Turkish War of 1788–1791. The rebellion was planned in 1787, since it was anticipated that the Habsburg Monarchy would enter into war against the Ottomans. The Habsburg-organised Serbian Free Corps, among whom Koča Anđelković was a prominent captain (hence the movement's historiographical name), initially captured and held various central parts of Ottoman Serbia during 1788 and 1789. After the arrival of regular Habsburg armies, who captured Belgrade from the Ottomans on 8 October (1789), the liberated Serbian territory was greatly expanded and became a Habsburg protectorate under military administration, called Serbia (German: Serbien). By the Treaty of Sistova (1791), Habsburg forces had to retreat, and the Ottomans regained the entire liberated territory. Such an outcome also ended Serbian hopes for liberation through alliance with the Habsburgs.

== Background ==
=== Ottoman Serbs ===
The Serbs had taken an active part in the wars fought in the Balkans against the Ottoman Empire, and also organised uprisings. Because of this, they suffered persecution and their territories were devastated. Major migrations from Serbia into Habsburg territory ensued.

=== Habsburg-Russian alliance ===
Due to conflicts around the Caucasus in 1786, relations between Russia and the Ottomans soured. The next year, Joseph II and Catherine II met in Crimea for the second time, which prompted the Ottomans to declare war on Russia. In the meantime, the Austrians prepared the Serb refugees for war.

== History ==
=== Koča's frontier rebellion ===
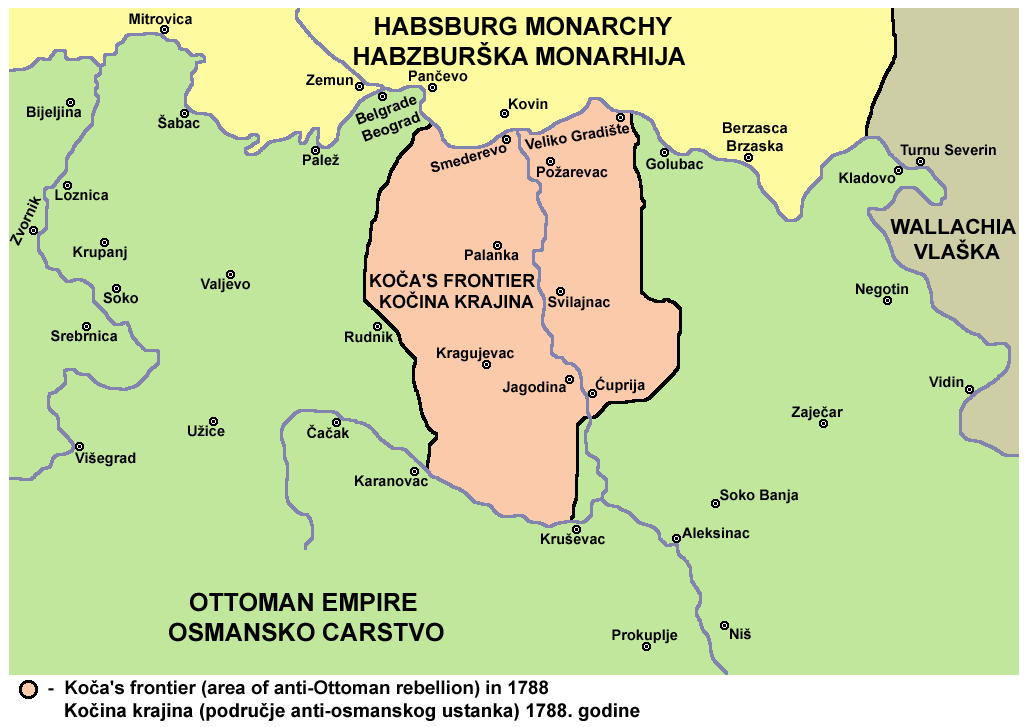
Koča's frontier (area of anti-Ottoman rebellion) in 1788.

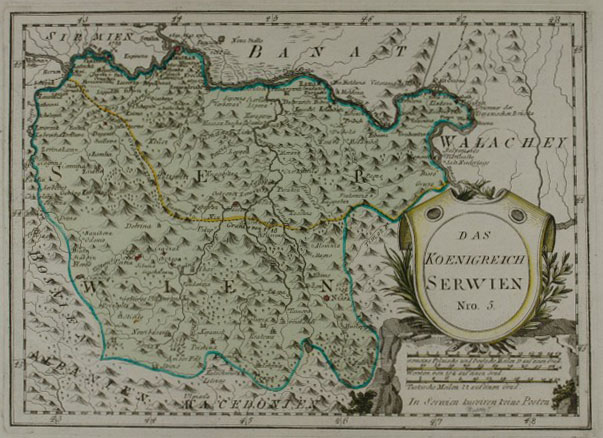
Map of "the Kingdom of Serbia", by Franz Johann Joseph von Reilly (1791).

A Serbian Free Corps of 5,000 soldiers had been established in Banat, composed of refugees that had fled earlier conflicts in the Ottoman Empire. The Corps would fight for liberation of Serbia and unification under Habsburg rule. The main commander was the Austrian major Mihailo Mihaljević. Among volunteers were Aleksa Nenadović, Stanko Arambašić, the prominent Radič and Đorđe Petrović but most of all Koča the Captain. The Austrians used the Corps in two failed attempts to seize Belgrade, in late 1787 and early 1788.

The Austrians entered this war in February 1788, though they had by now lost their best chance for an easy victory. The slow preparations of Russia resulted in the Ottoman concentration on Belgrade. The Austrians relied on Russian support in Moldavia, which only began in late 1788, and Joseph II seemed to have been reluctant to fight the Ottomans. In July, the Ottomans crossed the Danube and broke into Austrian Banat. A shortage of supplies struck both sides, and disease struck the Austrian soldiers. As many as 50,000 Serb refugees flooded across the Danube, causing logistical problems for the Austrians. In mid-August, Joseph II dispatched 20,400 soldiers into Banat.

=== Habsburg occupation ===
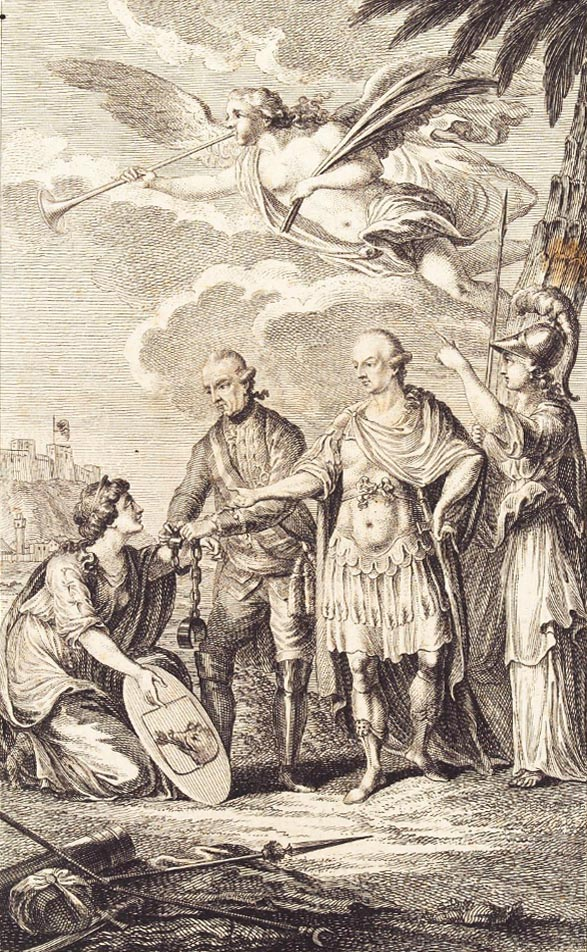
Liberated Serbia, romanticist work by Johann Georg Mansfeld

On 8 October 1789, Ernst Gideon von Laudon took over Belgrade. Austrian forces occupied Serbia, and many Serbs fought in the Habsburg free corps, gaining organisation and military skills. The occupation was accompanied by the Catholic Church which sought to convert the Orthodox Serbs, which made the Serbs look to Russia for aid after the Ottoman regaining of the area in 1791.

Emperor Joseph II died on 20 February 1790, and his successor Leopold II consequently decided to abandon further war efforts and conclude peace with the sultan. The Treaty of Sistova was signed on 4 August 1791, thus ending the war. Serbia was to return its gains to the Ottomans. Habsburg armies started to withdraw across the Danube and Sava rivers, joined by thousands of Serbian families who feared Ottoman persecution. Finally, the last Habsburg forces evacuated Belgrade Fortress on 23-24 October 1791, marking the restoration of Ottoman rule in Serbia.

== Aftermath ==
After the war, the Ottomans granted Serbs the right to collect local taxes. The displaced janissaries, excluded from the Ottoman Army following reorganization, sought refuge in Serbia (Sanjak of Smederevo) where they tried to revoke the rights granted to the Serbs. These renegade janissaries, called dahije, murdered as many as 150 Serb leaders (knezovi), sparking the First Serbian Uprising (1804). The leader of the uprising, Karađorđe Petrović, had earlier served in the Austrian army as a volunteer during the Habsburg occupation. The uprising expanded into the Serbian Revolution (1804–17), which saw the de facto independence of Serbia.

== Legacy ==
An annual manifestation, the "Days for Koča's Frontier" (Дани Кочине крајине), takes place in Jagodina and Kladovo in honour of the rebellion.

== See also ==
- Habsburg Serbia (disambiguation)
- Battle of Mainz, neutral Serbian observers

== Sources ==
- Aksan, Virginia H. (2013) [2007]. Ottoman Wars, 1700-1870: An Empire Besieged. London & New York: Routledge.
- Bataković, Dušan T., ed. (2005). Histoire du peuple serbe [History of the Serbian People] (in French). Lausanne: L’Age d’Homme. ISBN 9782825119587.
- Bronza, Boro (2010). "The Habsburg Monarchy and the Projects for Division of the Ottoman Balkans, 1771-1788". Empires and Peninsulas: Southeastern Europe between Karlowitz and the Peace of Adrianople, 1699–1829. Berlin: LIT Verlag. pp. 51–62. ISBN 9783643106117.
- Ćirković, Sima (2004). The Serbs. Malden: Blackwell Publishing. ISBN 9781405142915.
- Ćorović, Vladimir (2001) [1997]. "Kočina krajina" [Koča's Frontier]. Историја српског народа [History of the Serbian people] (in Serbian). Belgrade: Јанус.
- Đorđević, M.; Nedeljković, S. (2015). "Политичке прилике у београдском пашалуку у предвечерје српске револуције (1787-1804)". Teme-Časopis za Društvene Nauke: 965–979.
- Jelavich, Barbara (1983). History of the Balkans: Eighteenth and Nineteenth Centuries. Vol. 1. Cambridge University Press. ISBN 9780521252492.
- Nedeljković, Slaviša D.; Đorđević, Miloš Z.; Popović, Aleksa M. (2022). "ИСТОЧНО ПИТАЊЕ И ФАКТОРИ ИНТЕГРАЦИЈЕ СРПСКОГ НАРОДА У ПЕРИОДУ ОД 1774. ДО 1807. ГОДИНЕ". Лесковачки зборник. 62: 73–90.
- Novaković, Stojan (1906). Tursko carstvo pred srpski ustanak, 1780–1804. Beograd Davidović – via Archive.org.
- Pantelić, Dušan (1930). Кочина крајина. Beograd: Srpska kraljevska akademija.
- Pantelić, Dušan (1934). "Крајина у последњем аустријско-турском рату (1788-1791)". Годишњица Николе Чупића. 43. Beograd: Државна штампарија.
- Stefanović, Radmilo (1956). Kočina krajina. Prosveta.
- Svirčević, Miroslav M. (2002). "Knežinska i seoska samouprava u Srbiji 1739-1788-delokrug i identitet lokalne samouprave u Srbiji od Beogradskog mira (1739) do Austrijsko-turskog rata (1788)". Balcanica (32–33): 183–196. doi:10.2298/BALC0233183S. hdl:21.15107/rcub_dais_5695.
- Radojičić, Branko S. (2012). Аустријско шпијунирање у Београдском пашалуку 1782-1785: Хабзбуршки обавештајци у Србији пред Турско аустријски рат 1788-1791. Kraljevo.
- Roider, Karl A. Jr. (1982). Austria's Eastern Question, 1700-1790. Princeton University Press. ISBN 9781400856695.
- Stavrianos, Leften (2000) [1958]. The Balkans Since 1453. London: Hurst. ISBN 9781850655510.
