= Jovan Kovač =

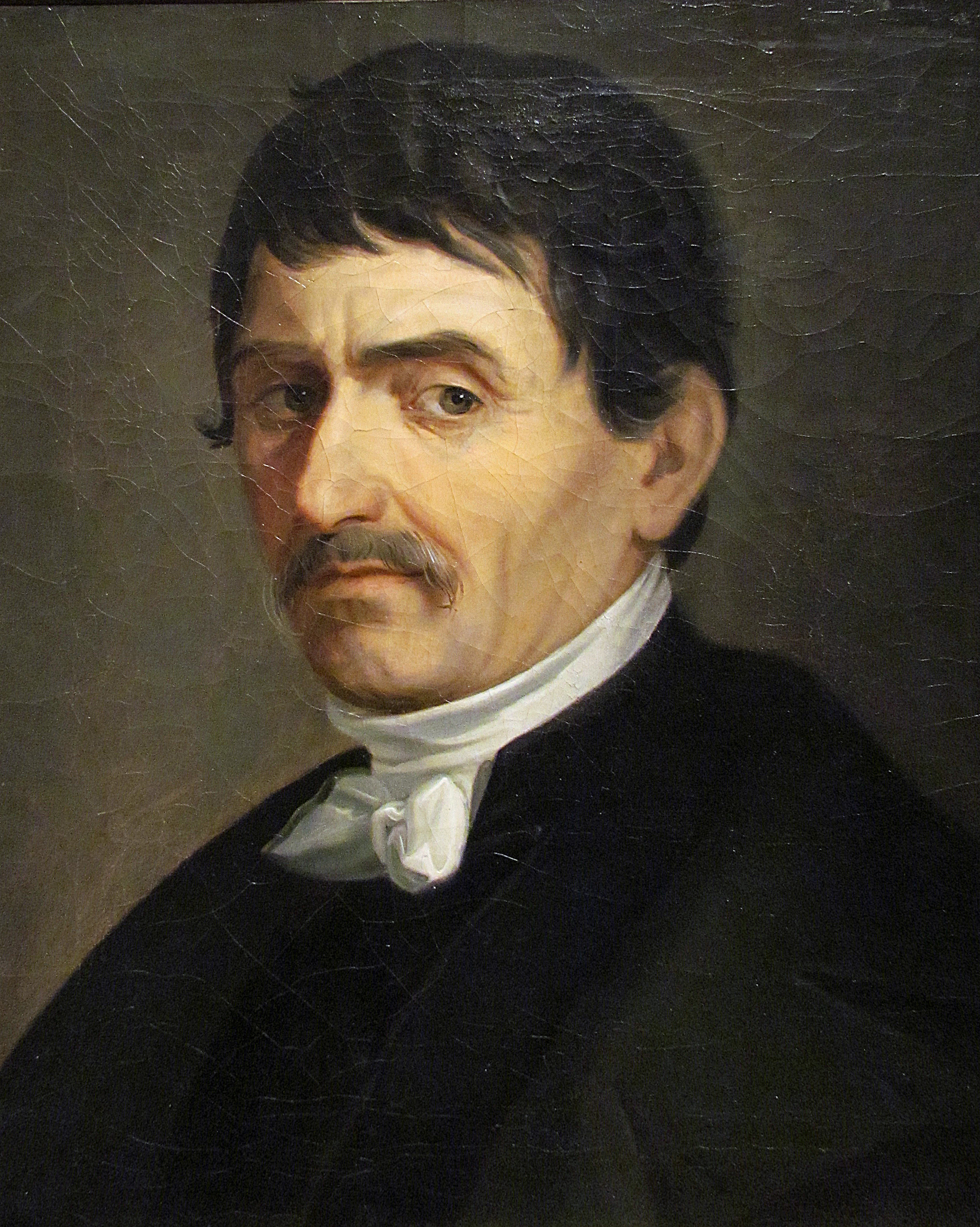
Jovan Kovač, portrait by Dimitrije Avramović, based on that of Konstantin Danil (1836).

Jovan Petrović (Serbian Cyrillic: Јован Петровић, 1772–1837), known as Jovan Kovač (Јован Ковач, "Jovan the Blacksmith"), was a Serb blacksmith. He participated in the Serbian Free Corps that fought in the Austro-Turkish War (1788–1791) and began his blacksmith apprenticeship during his military service, finally becoming a master blacksmith in Austrian Zemun after a decade of work. He was the master cannon repairer for the Serbian Army that fought against the Ottoman Empire in the First Serbian Uprising (1804–13).

== Early life ==
Petrović (or Petronijević) was born in the village of Svojnovo in 1772/73. At the age of 16 he and his maternal aunt's husband went to Syrmia and volunteered in the Serbian Free Corps that fought in the Austro-Turkish War. He joined the detachment of Austrian Serb major Mihailo Mihaljević in 1788, and distinguished himself especially during the rescue of Radič Petrović in 1790 near Belgrade. He was wounded twice in the latter operation, for which he was awarded a golden medal for courage by Mihaljević. During the war, he learned the blacksmith trade from master Đorđe Sapundžić. He also learnt to speak Turkish and German. He became known as Jovan Kovač ("the blacksmith").

== Master blacksmith ==
With the reduction of the Free Corps, and granting of military certification, Kovač returned briefly to his family in Jagodina after 10 October 1790. He then worked in the forge of master Anđelko Georgijević in Semlin (now Zemun) for eight years. He received the master blacksmith classification to work for the agricultural class (so-called sekiraš) in the Zemun suburb on 10 March 1798 by the Zemun magistrate. In October 1801 and February 1802 the Zemun suburb (known as Podgrađe), inhabited by Serbs, complained to the Zemun magistrate on the bad work of the Zemun suburb's main master blacksmith-farrier (the finer status) Blasius Dirich, an alcoholic, and demanded that Jovan Kovač replace Dirich as the main master-farrier, to allow him to repair hinges and carriages, as his work was much better and more permanent. Jovan Kovač was forbidden to work on carriages as this was strictly assigned to the main master with farrier classification and membership in the Zemun Guild (a privileged organization made up of Germans), but a complaint from the auditor (military judge) from Sremska Mitrovica finally allowed Jovan Kovač to work "German jobs". Kovač was known for his excellent work and received attestation from leading citizens. On 17 June 1804 Jovan Kovač asked to receive the master blacksmith-farrier status in the Zemun suburb and to enter the Zemun Guild. There was a conflict in which the Zemun suburb supported Kovač while the Zemun Guild denied his merits, "an untrained immigrant". The Zemun economic adjunct Kellerman supported Kovač and wrote in appeals to the Zemun magistrate in the name of "all of the German and Illyrian (Serb) municipalities". On 23 November 1804 the magistrate concluded that Kovač was to be given membership in the Zemun Guild, but the guild still opposed the conclusion in the following months. The conflict irritated the General Command which supported the magistrate's decision. He finally received the full rights in February 1805. The story goes that Kovač was given his diploma after repairing a Viennese nobleman's carriage.

== Serbia ==
Throughout the First Serbian Uprising (1804–13), Kovač constructed and repaired cannons and weapons for the Serbian Army. He was known to have crossed into Serbia and worked on repairs during battles. The strengthening of a 24-pound cannon, mentioned on 29 June 1806, was most likely his work. The vojvoda Kara-Pavle Simeunović witnessed how Kovač strengthened a "cherry cannon" and sat on it while firing to ensure its quality, which delighted supreme commander Karađorđe. Kovač received a letter of thanks from Karađorđe in 1810 for his contribution to the liberation of Serbia, which included "I won't forget [the battle of] Mišar 1806". For his work, he was paid 3,696 groschen by the Serbian Governing Council on 25 April 1808. He constructed an iron cannon on which he inscribed his name and gifted to the Serbian Army during the uprising. Most of his work during the uprising was strengthening barrels and constructing gun carriages. Thus, his contribution was surely great also for the Belgrade Arsenal, important in the struggle against the Ottoman Empire.

During Prince Miloš Obrenović's reign (1815–39), he worked in Serbia for months at a time. In the period of 1819–1829, the two large cannons outside the National Chancellery were maintained by Kovač. Prince Miloš was once so angry with his treasurer Nikola Nikolajević that he ordered Kovač to shackle him, but instead, Kovač freed him from jail in Kragujevac. Prussian captain Otto Dubislav Pirch travelled Serbia (and wrote a travelogue) in 1829 and met with an "interesting elder", Jovan from Zemun, who told stories about his time in Serbia and acquaintance with Karađorđe. In 1829, Prince Miloš asked Kovač to bring him the seal of Despot Stefan Lazarević (r. 1402–1427), which Kovač had found. He designed a Serbian coat of arms which he sent to Prince Miloš in 1830. Kovač hosted a group of Berliners invited by Prince Miloš, and due to the positive experiences received an honorary membership in the Museum of Berlin.

In 1830, the first church bell rang in Belgrade, constructed by Kovač. This was forbidden according to Ottoman decrees, but Kovač, who also rang it, reportedly said "It's mine to raise, let the Pasha shoot, if he wants to shoot". Prince Miloš asked him to stay in Serbia and choose whichever house in Belgrade he wanted. In 1831 he repaired the first steamboat in Zemun, and was thus given lifetime free fares, which he declined, but he still travelled with it to Novi Sad to ensure that it worked properly.

Apart from his traditional profession and cannon repair, he forged crosses, iconostases and church bells for the Orthodox churches in Serbia. Kovač was a close friend of Austrian major Cservinka, the President of the Judicial Court Lazarević, and Metropolitan Stefan Stratimirović, and was also a pen pal of writer Vuk Karadžić. He was a subscriber of Serbian magazines and was updated on Serbian literature. Jovan Petrović-Kovač died on 23 July 1837, at his house in Zemun. He had a son, Živko Petrović (d. 1868), a painter schooled in Vienna. Upon his death Sima Milutinović Sarajlija suggested that Metropolitan Petar II Petrović-Njegoš buy the sabre of Karađorđe which Živko Petrović, "the son of Jovan the Blacksmith", now had in his possession.

Konstantin Danil painted his portrait in 1832, held at the Belgrade City Museum, while a copy made by Dimitrije Avramović in 1836 is housed at the National Museum in Belgrade.

In his birth village of Svojnovo, a monument was erected in his honour.

== See also ==
- List of Serbian Revolutionaries
- Tomo Milinović, cannon engineer

== Sources ==
- Antić-Božić, Radmila (1955). "Портрет Јована Ковача – рад Константина Данила у Музеју града Београда" (PDF). ГОДИШЊАК. II. Музеј града Београда: 145–150.
- Bogdanović, Branko (2000). "Артиљерија 1808-1813". Историјски часопис [Historical Review]. 45–46. Istorijski institut: 95-.
- Ilić, Tanasije Ž. (1955). "Како је Јован Петровић-Ковач постао мајстор" (PDF). ГОДИШЊАК. II. Музеј града Београда: 133–144.
- Krstić, Milivoje (1994). "Прилог проучавању фрајкора у ваљевском крају" (PDF). Гласник. 28–29. Valjevo: Историјски архив.
- Milićević, Milan Đ. (1888). Поменик знаменитих људи у српског народа новијега доба. Издање Чупићеве задужбине. pp. 259–261 – via Archive.org.
- Nenadović, Konstantin N. (1903) [1883]. Живот и дела великог Ђорђа Петровића Кара-Ђорђа. Vol. I (2 ed.). Belgrade: Штампа Савића и Комп.
- Pavlović, Dragoljub M. (1910). Србија за време последњег аустријско-турског рата: 1788-1791 г. Српска краљевска академија.
