= Kurilovo =

Kurilovo (Russian: Курилово) is the name of several rural localities in Russia:

- Kurilovo, Kaluga Oblast, a rural locality (a selo) in Zhukovsky District, Kaluga Oblast
- Kurilovo, Moscow, a rural locality (a settlement) in Shchapovskoye Settlement, Troitsky Administrative Okrug, Moscow
- Kurilovo, Vladimir Oblast, a selo in Sobinsky District, Vladimir Oblast
