= Charles Clement, Count of Pellegrini =

Portrait by Nikolaus Rhein, 1791

Count Charles Clement von Pellegrini (20 November 1720 – 28 November 1796) was an Italian-born Austrian military leader.

== Biography ==
He was born in 1720 in Verona to an Italian aristocratic family. Four of his brothers also became soldiers in the Austrian army, while the fifth became a Jesuit monk.

Having entered the Austrian army as an officer early, Pellegrini, as a 14-year-old teenager, took part in the Siege of Philippsburg (1734). Three years later, during the Russo-Turkish War (1735–1739), Pellegrini was transferred to the Danube Flotilla in 1737, which consisted of nine sailing ships with 22 to 40 guns and six galleys with 36 guns each. Attempts to fully use the flotilla in combat failed due to bureaucratic delays and a number of defeats of the ground forces, but this did not affect Pellegrini's career. By the beginning of the War of the Austrian Succession, he was a major, and by the beginning of the Seven Years' War, he was a colonel and commander of an infantry regiment.

During the Seven Years' War, Pellegrini distinguished himself in the Battle of Breslau (1757), where two infantry regiments successfully withstood the attack of four cavalry regiments, for which he was awarded the Order of Maria Theresa the following year. Pellegrini then fought in the Battle of Hochkirch (1758), and in 1759 he was promoted to major general and appointed commander of an infantry brigade, with which he fought in the Battles of Maxen and Torgau.

Soon after the end of the Seven Years' War, Pellegrini was promoted to Feldmarschall-Leutnant.

Pellegrini subsequently held the posts of commander of the troops in Upper Austria, inspector general of the infantry, and member of the Hofkriegsrat. In 1767, he became honorary chef of the 49th Infantry Regiment.

Pellegrini was given command of all engineering and sapper troops (from 1769) and then, in addition to his previous position, the overall command of all Austrian fortresses. In these positions, Pellegrini sought to establish a system of training military engineers. In addition, under his command, the fortresses of Theresienstadt and Josefstadt were built and the fortress of Königgrätz was designed.

When the next Austro-Turkish War broke out, and the retreat of the Austrian army after the Battle of Karánsebes ended in chaos, Pellegrini was appointed commandant of Timișoara, from where he planned to support the Austrian siege of Belgrade, which was controlled by the Turks. When the fortress of Belgrade was stormed on 30 September 1789, and Field Marshal Laudon was temporarily incapacitated by a horse kick, Pellegrini took over command and was able to secure the captured suburbs, which later would lead to the fall of the fortress. For this action, he was awarded the Grand Cross of the Order of Maria Theresa (12 October 1789).

After the end of the war, Pellegrini returned to Vienna, where he lived in his own mansion, which he had himself built.

In 1792, he was awarded the Order of the Golden Fleece. He died on 28 November 1796 in Vienna.

== Sources ==
- Constantin von Wurzbach: Pellegrini, Karl Clemens Graf. BLKÖ Part 21, page 440. Kaiserlich-königliche Hof- und Staatsdruckerei, Vienna 1870.
- Jaromir Hirtenfeld: Der Militär-Maria-Theresien-Orden und seine Mitglieder. Band 1, p. 252.
- Jacob A. Hyrtl: Die fürstlichen, gräflichen und freiherrlichen Familien des österreichischen Kaiserstaates. Band 2, p. 121.
- Leopold Auspitz: Das Infanterie-Regiment Freiherr von Hess Nr. 49. p. 379.
- C. A. Schweigerd: Oesterreichs Helden und Heerführer. Band 3, part 1, pp. 350.
- Franz Johann Joseph von Reilly:Skizzirte Biographien der berühmtesten Feldherren Oesterreichs. p. 394.
- Adolf Schinzl: Pellegrini, Karl Clemens Graf. In: Allgemeine Deutsche Biographie (ADB). Band 25, Duncker & Humblot, Leipzig 1887, p. 331.
