= Ottoman Serbia (disambiguation) =

The term Ottoman Serbia may refer to:

- Ottoman Serbia, historiographical term for various parts of modern-day Serbia during the period of Ottoman rule, from the late 14th century, up to 1912
- Vassal Ottoman Despotate of Serbia, in the 15th century.
- Vassal Ottoman Principality of Serbia, in the 19th century.

== See also ==
- Serbia (disambiguation)
- Habsburg Serbia (disambiguation)
- Moravian Serbia (disambiguation)
