= Moravian Serbia (disambiguation) =

Moravian Serbia may refer to:

- The region of Serbia corresponding to the basin of the Morava River
- Moravian Serbia, a medieval Serbian Principality (1371–1402)
- The Habsburg Kingdom of Serbia (1718–1739)
- The autonomous Principality of Serbia (1815–1882)
- The independent Kingdom of Serbia (1882–1918)
- The Yugoslav Moravian Banate (1929–1941)
- The modern Central Serbia

== See also ==
- Serbia (disambiguation)
- Habsburg Serbia (disambiguation)
- Ottoman Serbia (disambiguation)
