= Svojnovo =

Coordinates: 43.7989°N 21.3044°E

- Village
- Interactive map of Svojnovo
- Country: Serbia
- District: Pomoravlje District
- Municipality: Paraćin

Population (2002)
  - Total: 1,386
- Time zone: UTC+1 (CET)
  - Summer (DST): UTC+2 (CEST)

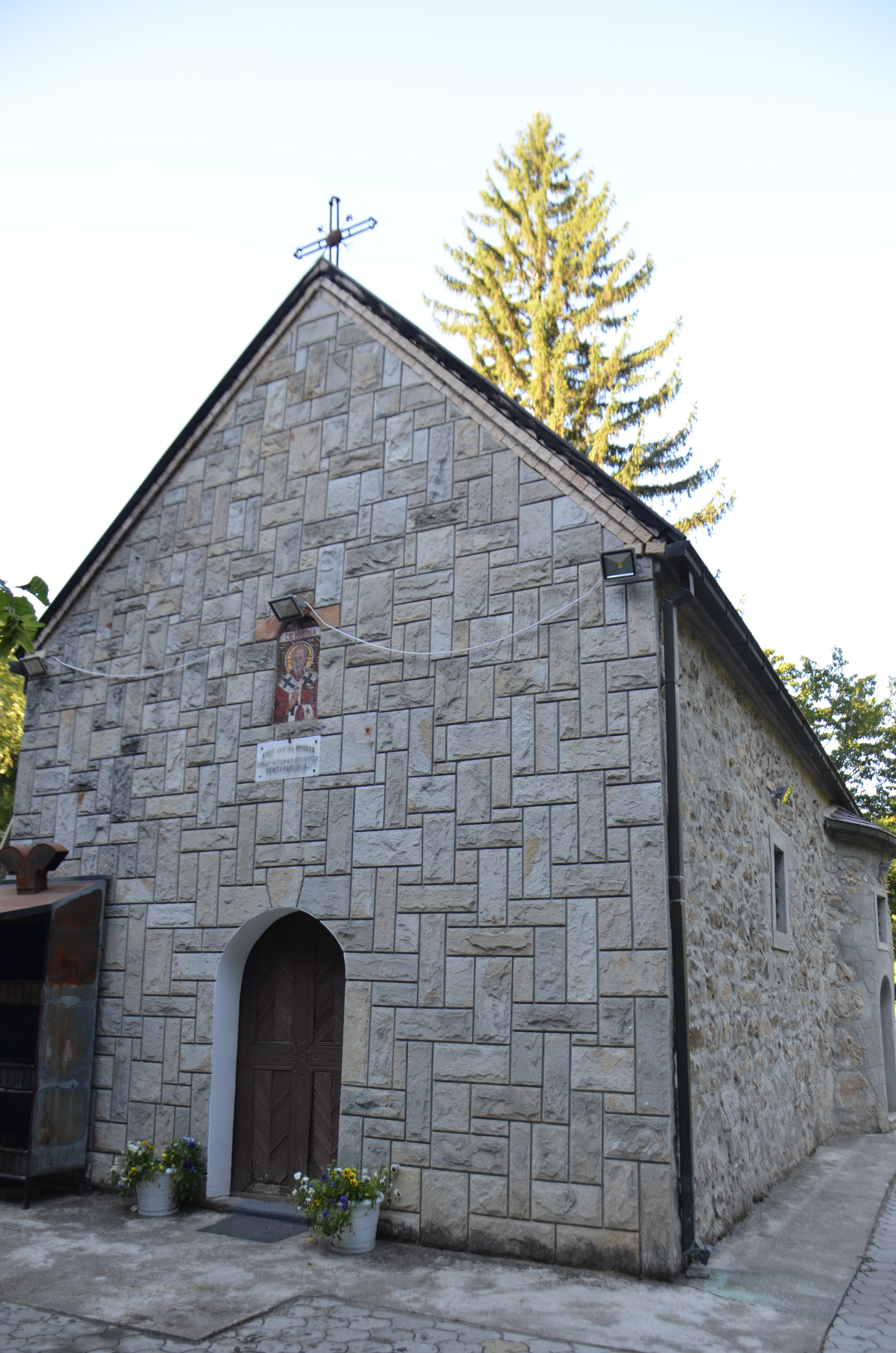
Svojnovo Monastery, Paraćin Municipality, Pomoravski District

Svojnovo is a village in the municipality of Paraćin, Serbia. According to the 2002 census, the village has a population of 1,386 people.

== Notable people ==
- Jovan Kovač (1772–1837), blacksmith
