= Stanko Arambašić =

Serbian Free Corps commander

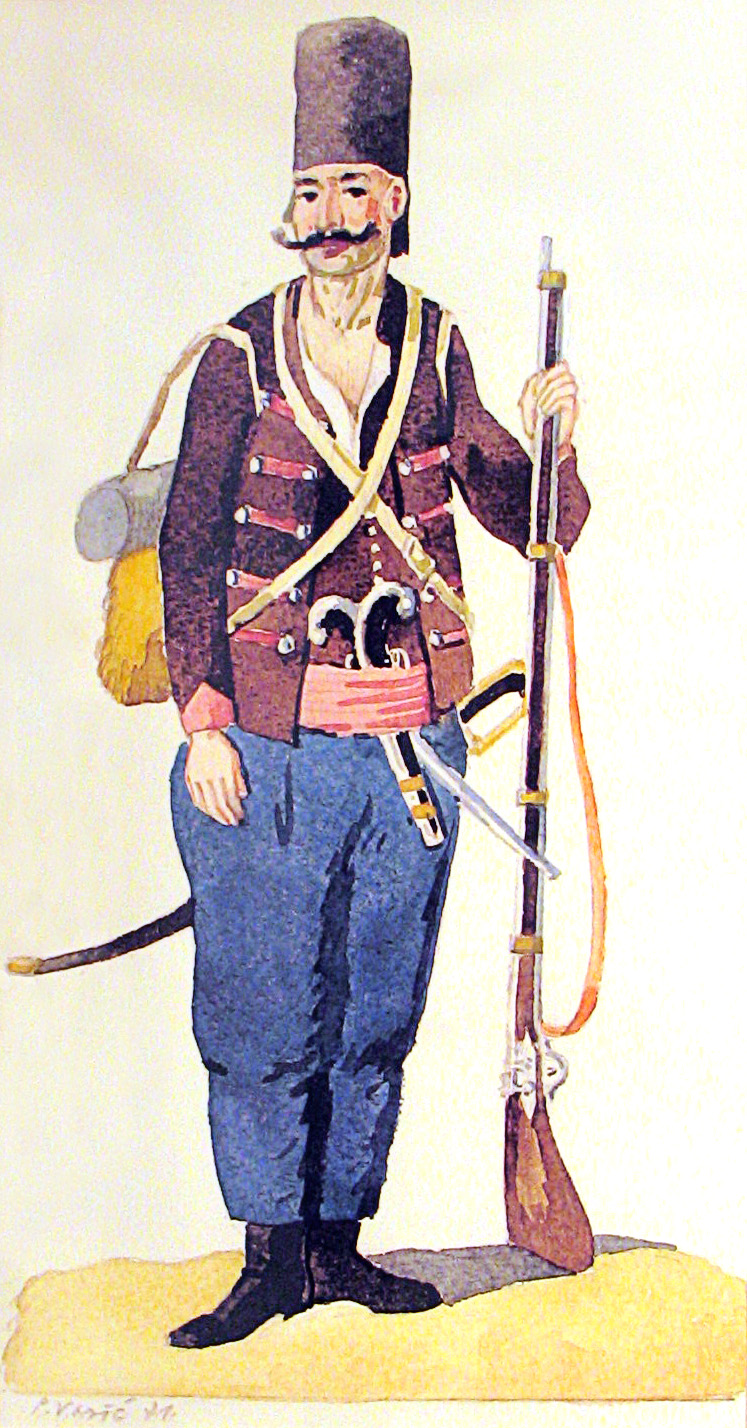
File:Serbian Free Corps soldier

Stanko Arambašić (Serbian Cyrillic: Станко Арамбашић; 1764–21 September 1798) was a Serbian hajduk, Serbian Free Corps commander during the Austro-Turkish War (1788-1791), militia commander in the Sanjak of Smederevo fighting the rebellious Janissaries following the war.

Arambašić was born in 1764 in the village of Kolare in the Levač region (today the municipality of Jagodina). He was a veteran of the Serbian Free Corps in the service of the Austrian imperial forces in the Austro-Turkish War (1788–1791). In "Monument of famous people in the Serbian people of recent times" by Milan Milićević states that Stanko was born in Veliko Selo, in the Belgrade district, although the footnote states that according to Vuk Karadžić he was born in Kolare in Levač. The data in Vuk Karadžić's book is a more reliable source for Stanko Arambašić, in fact, he was born in Kolare near Jagodina since the historian of the First Serbian Uprising, Lazar Arsenijević Batalaka also attests to that fact.

In the 1790s he was the commander of a special Serbian militia under Ottoman Vizier Hadji Mustafa Pasha that fought the rebellious Janissaries in the Sanjak of Smederevo (also known as the "Pashalik of Belgrade"). He held the rank of bimbaša in the militia. In the battle of Kolare, at the beginning of August 1793, he managed to prevent Janissaries and the renegade Osman Pazvantoğlu from taking over the Pashalik. It was rumoured that his militia numbered 16,000, mostly composed of rayah and also some Free Corps veterans. Of them, every fifty people had their buljubaša, over a hundred there was a harambaša and over a thousand bimbaša, adopted from the Ottoman Turkish military ranks. Each soldier had to have two bags: one for laundry (two shirts, two underpants, and one pair of new shoes) and the other for food. Each had a musket, knife and two flintlocks, all in good condition.

In 1797, a military expedition of Küçük Hüseyin Pasha failed to conquer Vidin or capture Osman Pazvantoğlu, so he and the Janissaries, at the end of November, tried again to take over the Pashalik of Belgrade. The clashes took place in the vicinity of Veliko Selo which Stanko's army defended. After fierce fighting, the Janissaries were expelled from Belgrade and Pazvantoğlu fled back to Vidin. The tactical members of the Sublime Porte soon realized that the stability of the Ottoman Empire was quite shaken and immediately took harsh measures against the Serbs who took part in the Austro-Turkish War, and many like Koča Anđelković and Rigas Feraios were killed after capture. Commander Stanko was also killed then. According to the report of Milan Đ. Milićević, the murder was committed on Saturday 21 September 1798 in a "small gypsy house" of "someone" called Gruja. The Serbs found Stanko's body the next day in Jezava and buried him in a village called Godomin, near Smederevo. In 1799, the Porte was issued a firman which allowed the return of the Janissaries, and the Sultan Selim III forgave Pazvantoğlu's rebellion and appointed him Pasha.

Stanko was of medium height, very handsome, and brave in combat.

== See also ==
- Mihailo Mihaljević
