= Siege of Belgrade (1789) =

Military action of the Austro-Turkish War

Coordinates: 44°49′N 20°28′E

- Part of the Austro-Turkish War
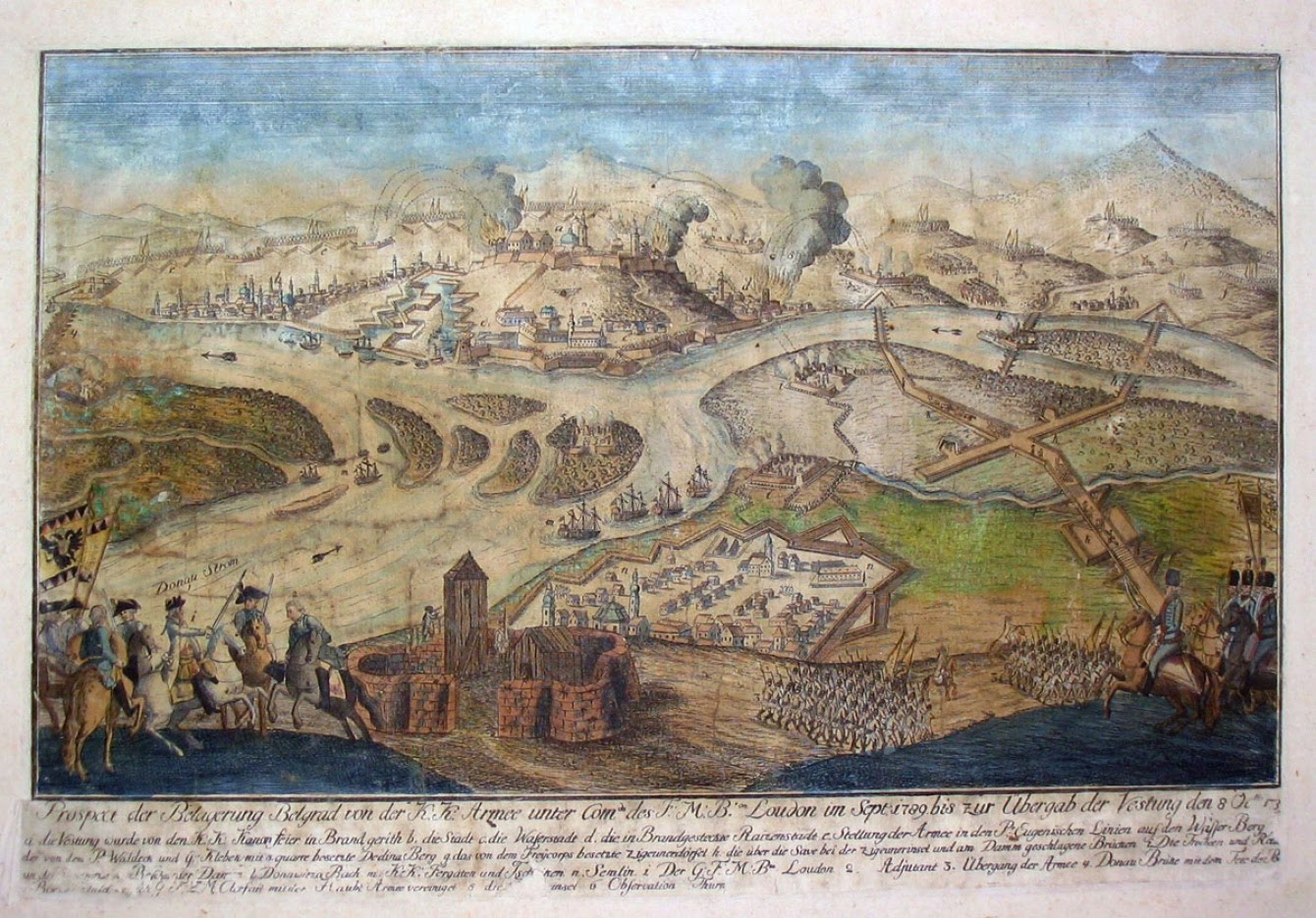
- Siege of Belgrade in 1789
Date	15 September – 8 October 1789
Location	Belgrade, Ottoman Empire (modern-day Serbia)
Result	Austrian victory

Belligerents
Habsburg monarchy	Ottoman Empire

Commanders and leaders
Ernst von Laudon; Joseph Maria von Colloredo; Karl von Pellegrini; Franz von Lauer; Mihailo Mihaljević	Osman Pasha; Mustafa Pasha

Units involved
44 infantry battalions 30 cavalry battalions Serbian Free Corps	

Strength
120,900; 200 siege guns	9,000; 456 guns

Casualties and losses
110 killed, 357 wounded	800

In the siege of Belgrade (15 September – 8 October 1789) a Habsburg Austrian army led by feldmarschall Ernst Gideon von Laudon besieged an Ottoman force under Osman Pasha in the fortress of Belgrade. After a three-week leaguer, the Austrians forced the surrender of the fortress. During the campaign which was part of the Austro-Turkish War, the Austrian army was greatly hampered by illness. Austria held the city until 1791 when it handed Belgrade back to the Ottomans according to the terms of the peace treaty. Several Austrian soldiers who distinguished themselves during the siege later held important commands in the subsequent French Revolutionary Wars and Napoleonic Wars. Belgrade is the capital of modern Serbia.

At the urging of Russian Empress Catherine the Great, Joseph II, Holy Roman Emperor committed the Habsburg monarchy to a war against Ottoman Turkey. In 1788, the Austrians captured one fortress and seized some territory but most of their efforts were thwarted. In August 1788, Joseph appointed Laudon commander in Croatia where that general enjoyed some successes. After the commander of the main army became ill, Joseph replaced him with Laudon at the end of July 1789 and ordered his new commander to capture Belgrade. In mid-September, Laudon's army crossed the Sava River and laid siege to Belgrade with 120,000 soldiers and over 200 cannons. At the end of the month the Austrians cleared the Ottomans from the suburbs. In the face of a destructive bombardment, Osman Pasha negotiated the surrender of the city on 7 October in exchange for allowing the garrison free passage to a Turkish fortress.

== Background ==
Emperor Joseph II traveled to the Russian Empire where he met Catherine the Great at Kherson on 14 May 1787. As the two sovereigns toured the Crimea, Catherine talked Joseph into joining her in a war against the Ottoman Empire. Russia provoked the war with the Ottomans in 1787 by insisting that it recognize a Russian protectorate over Georgia. For their part, the Ottomans instigated a revolt among the Crimean Tatars. When war broke out, Austria was bound to support Russia by a secret treaty. Just before the start of the war, Wolfgang Amadeus Mozart composed the La Bataille K. 535 (also known as “Die Belagerung Belgrads”), which was most likely inspired by previous sieges of the city of Belgrade, while some scholars state that the composition was used to support the war effort.

In 1788, Emperor Joseph personally led the main Austrian army, advised by feldmarschall Franz Moritz von Lacy, in a campaign in the valley of the Sava River. One independent corps led by Prince Karl Borromäus of Liechtenstein operated in Croatia, a second corps under Wilhelm von Wartensleben in the Banat, and a third corps under Fabris in Transylvania. A fourth corps commanded by Prince Josias of Saxe-Coburg-Saalfeld joined the Russian army in Moldavia. That year the emperor's army captured Šabac (German: Schabatz) while Saxe-Coburg and Russian General Alexander Suvorov overran Moldavia. However, Liechtenstein was defeated by the Turks at Dubica and the other two Austrian corps were also unsuccessful. Joseph summoned feldmarschall Laudon out of retirement and appointed him to lead the corps in Croatia. By the time Laudon reached his command on 18 August 1788, his lieutenants Joseph Nikolaus De Vins and Joseph Anton Brentano had overrun the Ottoman entrenched camp near Dubica on the Una River.

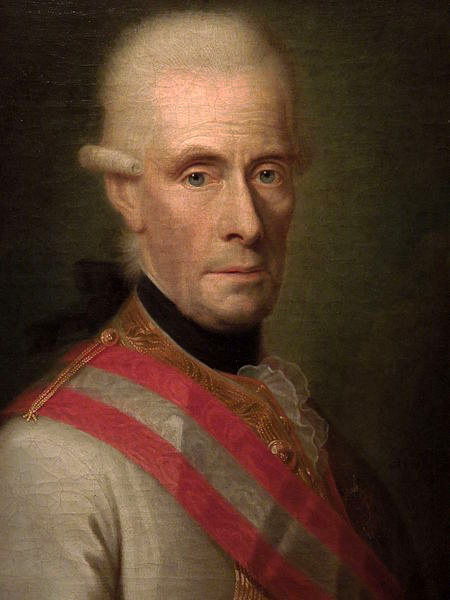
Gideon von Laudon

On 20 August 1788, Laudon's corps repulsed an attack by the Pasha of Travnik, inflicting 700 casualties on the Ottomans. The garrison of Dubica surrendered to the Austrians on 26 August. With the help of a flanking column under Joseph Anton Franz von Mittrowsky, the Pasha of Travnik was maneuvered out of his entrenched camp at Donji Jelovac. This allowed Laudon to move against the fortress of Novi Grad on the Una. The siege of Novi Grad began on 10 September. After repulsing a Turkish relief column on 20 September, Laudon ordered an assault the next day. This failed with 80 killed and 210 wounded, but a second assault on 3 October captured Novi Grad. The Austrians suffered losses of 220 killed and 353 wounded while total Turkish casualties during the siege were 400.

After the armies went into winter quarters, Emperor Joseph fell ill and transferred command of the main army to Marshal András Hadik. On 14 May 1789, Laudon returned to command the corps in Croatia which numbered 34,500 infantry and 3,000 cavalry. Colonel Andreas von Neu was Laudon's chief of staff. On 23 June, Laudon began operations against the fortress of Gradiška on the Sava with 15,900 infantry and gunners and 300 cavalry. The Austrians crossed the Sava above and below Gradiška and began building trenches that approached the fortress. Before the place was completely invested, the Turkish garrison slipped away on the night of 8 July. The Turks left behind a single man who was supposed to blow up the powder magazine, but this individual did not carry out the plan. Austrian losses for the siege were 38 killed and 120 wounded.

In Moldavia, the Austro-Russian army under Suvorov and Saxe-Coburg soundly defeated the Turks at the Battle of Focșani on 1 August 1789. Charles-Joseph, 7th Prince of Ligne arrived in May to assume command of Semlin (Zemun), which is now part of Belgrade but was a separate town in 1789. Ligne noted that there was a truce in force at the time and that of his corps of 30,000 soldiers, only 15,000 were fit for duty because of sickness. Ligne complained in a letter that the truce allowed the Ottomans to bring food supplies into Belgrade. Marshal Hadik with the main army became seriously ill and had to be relieved of command. Emperor Joseph appointed Laudon to replace Hadik on 28 July. At this time the emperor wrote to Loudon, "Cost what it may. I want you to take Belgrade". Loudon arrived at Semlin on 14 August, met with the outgoing commander Hadik on the 16th, and conferred with the temporary commander François von Clerfayt at Mehadia soon afterward. On 28 August the Ottomans attacked Mehadia but were driven off by Clerfayt.

== Siege ==
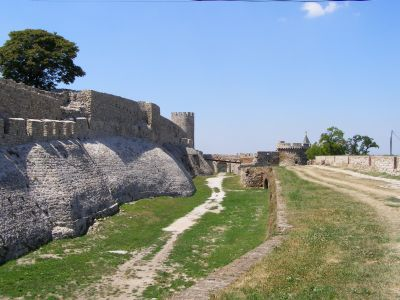
Belgrade Fortress walls.

On 30 August 1789, Laudon gave orders for his army to concentrate at Novi Banovci, northwest of Belgrade and Semlin. His plan was to cross the Sava on 13 September, but the timetable was accelerated when intelligence indicated that Abdy Pasha and 30,000 Ottomans were approaching. On 9 September, the Austrian advanced guard reached Banovci and the following day it crossed the Sava at Boljevci and established itself on high ground near Ostružnica. By 15 September, the bulk of the army was south of the Sava. The Austrian army consisted of 120,900 soldiers, though 33,000 men were not fit for duty because of sickness. The army included 10 battalions of grenadiers, 33 battalions of fusiliers, one battalion of sharpshooters, and 30½ divisions of cavalry. (In this sense, a division is equal to two squadrons of horsemen. So 30½ divisions would be 61 squadrons. In this era, a squadron had about 135 horsemen at full strength.) The siege train included cannons of various calibers: 120 24-pounders, eight 18-pounders, fifty 12-pounders, and thirty 6-pounders. In addition, Ligne had four 100-pound mortars in Semlin.

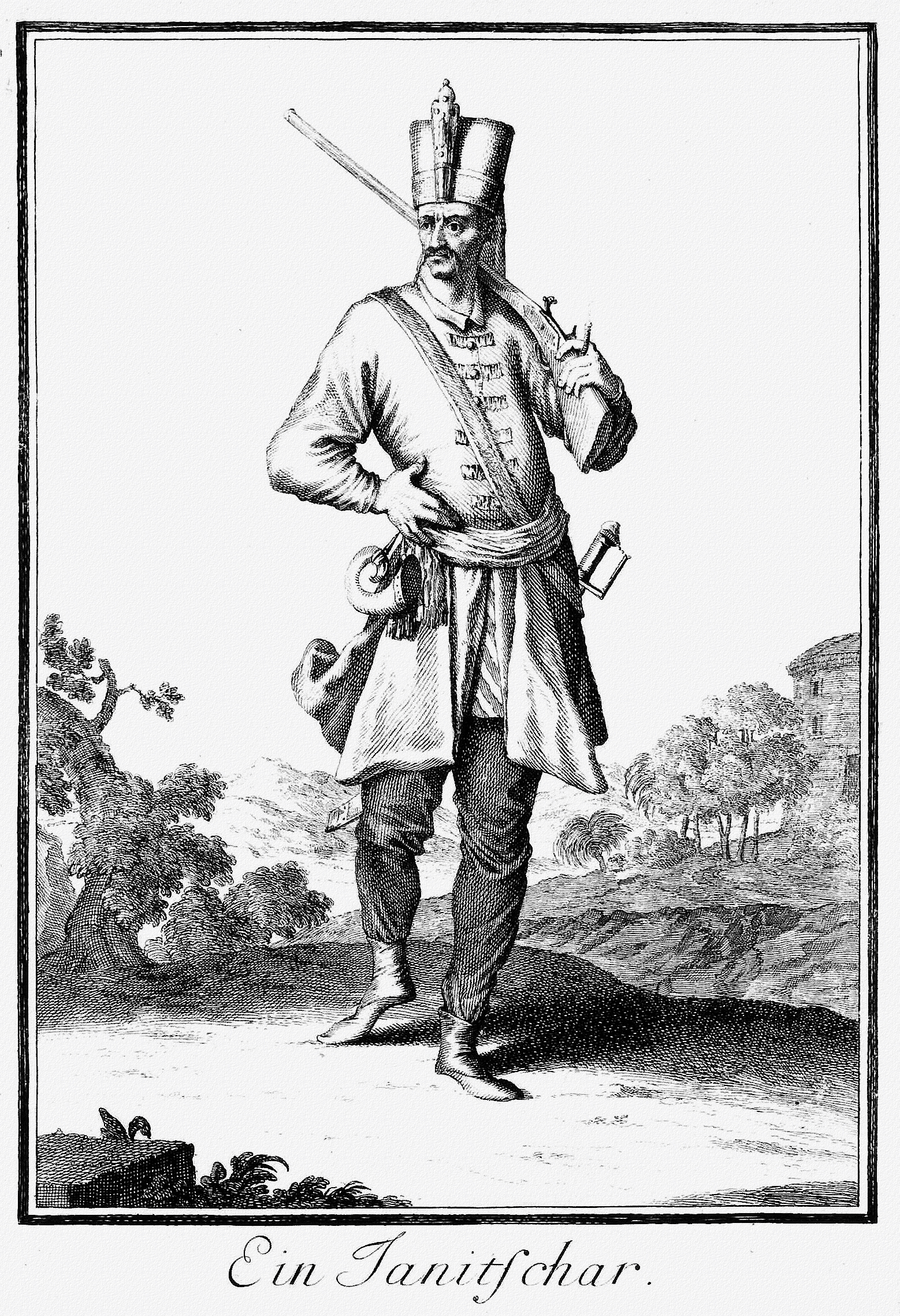
Turkish Janissary musketeer

Loudon divided the army into three parts. Clerfayt led a covering force designed to block any Ottoman relief attempts. Joseph, Count Kinsky commanded the main siege on the east bank of the Sava while Charles-Joseph of Ligne commanded on the west bank of the Sava at Semlin. Also with the army were future army commanders József Alvinczi, Johann von Hiller, Michael von Melas and Karl Mack von Leiberich, the last being a promising staff officer. Francis, later to be emperor, was also with the army. In 1789, Belgrade was located on the east bank of the Sava at its confluence with the Danube. The city consisted of a hilltop castle (Belgrade Fortress), the town, and the suburbs. The water suburb was to the north, the Palanka suburb was south of the castle hill, and the Raitzen suburb, also to the south. To defend the city, Osman Pasha commanded a garrison of 9,000 Turks armed with 456 cannons. The Ottomans had a flotilla of 20 one-masted vessels to guard the Danube against a larger fleet of Austrian vessels.

Laudon directed the army to take up the same positions that were occupied during the 1717 siege of Belgrade by the army of Prince Eugene of Savoy. The Austrians dug trenches and excavated battery positions. The bombardment of Belgrade's defenses began on 16 September. A heavy rain fell from 22 to 27 September which disrupted the siege operations. When the rain stopped, Loudon set 30 September as the date for storming the suburbs. At 5:00 am on that day, the Austrian fleet began bombarding the outer defenses. An hour later, the land batteries joined in the barrage. About 9:00 am four Austrian storming columns advanced on the suburbs and forced their way through the palisades. For four hours, the Turks fought stubbornly in a house to house struggle. Finally, they retreated within Belgrade's main defenses after suffering 800 casualties and losing 12 guns. The Austrians lost 110 killed and 357 wounded.

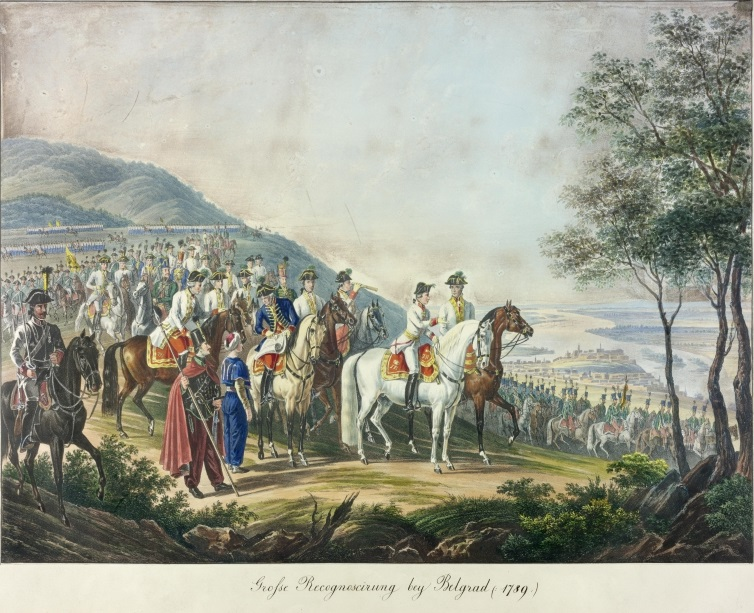
Archduke Francis and Laudon before Belgrade

News that Suvorov and Saxe-Coburg won at Rymnik on 22 September 1789 discouraged the Ottoman garrison. Harassed by the Serbian Free Corps (5,268 men under Mihailo Mihaljević), Abdy Pasha's relief army halted without coming to grips with Clerfayt's covering force. Orthodox bishop of Belgrade, Dionysios Papagiannousis, provided moral and spiritual support to the besiegers. The Austrians soon dug themselves trenches to protect their gains and their sappers dug a siege parallel close to Belgrade's covered way. The Ottomans launched four sorties in an attempt to delay the besiegers. For the next few days, Laudon emplaced his artillery batteries closer to the city. On the west bank of the Sava, Ligne set up a battery at a position called the Sauspitz from which his artillery directed an effective fire against the Ottoman defenses. Recovering from a severe bout of fever and dosing himself with quinine, Ligne had to be half-carried by two junior officers in his inspections of the trenches. He later boasted that his guns fired 5,662 round shot and 6,083 bomb shells during the siege. Two other high-ranking generals involved in the siege were Joseph Maria von Colloredo, an artillerist, and Karl Clemens von Pellegrini, an engineer.

On the morning of 6 October 1789, the Austrian batteries began a very intense bombardment, under which Belgrade's defenses rapidly crumbled. At 1:00 pm that day Osman Pasha demanded a 15-day suspension of military activity. Laudon replied, "Not 15 hours," and the bombardment continued until 9:00 am on 7 October. At that time the Ottoman commander requested a 6-hour suspension, which Loudon granted. After several hours of silence, Osman Pasha and two of his officers emerged from the main gate and requested a parley. They were quickly ushered to Laudon's headquarters where the capitulation was signed. In exchange for the surrender of Belgrade on 8 October, the Ottoman garrison was given a free passage with their personal and private possessions to Orșova. A prisoner exchange was also arranged between the combatants.

== Aftermath and legacy ==
Loudon marched the army to Smederevo, which was captured. Then the Austrian army blockaded Orșova, which finally surrendered in April 1790. Other Austrian forces were also successful. Saxe-Coburg occupied Bucharest, Friedrich Wilhelm, Fürst zu Hohenlohe-Kirchberg seized northern Wallachia, Anton Lipthay de Kisfalud overran the Timok valley, and Stephan Mihaljevich took Niš. The citizens of Vienna were elated by the victory. Emperor Joseph named Laudon the generalissimo of the Austrian armies. Ligne received the commander's cross to the Military Order of Maria Theresa eight days after the capture of Belgrade. However, the emperor soon snubbed Ligne, mistakenly believing that he was involved in the Brabant Revolution. Ligne never again held a military command. Austria soon became preoccupied by threats from the Kingdom of Prussia, by a loss of interest in the war by Russia, by the Brabant Revolution in the Austrian Netherlands, and by troubles throughout the empire.

Jealous of Austria's success, Prussia made diplomatic contacts with the Ottomans, suggesting an offensive alliance. Alarmed at Prussia's actions, Emperor Joseph withdrew troops from the Balkans and transferred them to Bohemia. At the end of the year, the emperor named Loudon to command the 150,000-man army forming in Bohemia to guard against Prussia. Joseph died on 28 February 1790 and was succeeded by his brother Leopold II, Holy Roman Emperor. Loudon took ill and died on 14 July 1790, after handing command of the Bohemian army to Colloredo. A truce between Austria and Turkey was arranged on 27 July 1790. This event was followed by the Treaty of Sistova on 4 August 1791. Austria restored Belgrade and other captured territories to the Ottomans in return for a strip of land in northern Bosnia. The Ottomans came to terms with the Russians by the Treaty of Jassy on 9 January 1792. By agreement, the Russians kept all captured lands east of the Dniester River.

A number of Austrian officers who performed noteworthy service at Belgrade rose to high command during the wars with the French First Republic and the First French Empire in the period from 1792 to 1815. Eugène-Guillaume Argenteau was Oberst (colonel) of the Laudon Infantry Regiment Nr. 29 during the siege. For his engineering work, Franz von Lauer earned promotion to general officer. Oberst Andreas O'Reilly von Ballinlough commanded the Modena Chevau-léger Regiment Nr. 13 and Oberst Prince Heinrich XV of Reuss-Plauen led the Wenzel Colloredo Infantry Regiment Nr. 56 during the siege. As a staff officer, Major Johann Heinrich von Schmitt distinguished himself at Belgrade. Count Heinrich von Bellegarde led a portion of the Wurmser Hussars in securing control of the Bexania dam on 8 September 1788. Other notable participants were Joseph Radetzky von Radetz.

In 1791, Stephen Storace composed The Siege of Belgrade, a comic opera in three acts to an English libretto by James Cobb. The dramatist Friedrich Kaiser included details related to the siege of Belgrade in his screenplay for a play about the Field Marshal Ernst Laudon and Habsburg–Ottoman War. The poem The Siege of Belgrade by Alaric Alexander Watts is a notable example of alliterative verse with these opening lines.

An Austrian army, awfully arrayed,
Boldly by battery besieged Belgrade
Cossack commanders cannonading come,
