= Siokovac =

Coordinates: 43.979°N 21.182°E

- Village
- Interactive map of Siokovac
- Country: Serbia
- District: Pomoravlje District
- Municipality: Jagodina

Population (2002)
  - Total: 381
- Time zone: UTC+1 (CET)
  - Summer (DST): UTC+2 (CEST)

Siokovac is a village in the municipality of Jagodina, Serbia. According to the 2002 census, the village has a population of 381 people.

== Notable people ==
- Radič Petrović (1738–1816), Serbian Revolutionary
