= Rakri, Punjab =

Town in Punjab, India

Rakri
- Village
- Location in Punjab, India
- Coordinates: 31.9250193°N 75.7928829°E
- Country: India
- State: Punjab
- District: Hoshiarpur
- Tahsil: Mukerian

Area
  - Total: 5.47 km^{2} (2.11 sq mi)

Population (2011)
  - Total: 5,722
  - Density: 1,050/km^{2} (2,710/sq mi)
- Time zone: UTC+5:30 (IST)

Rakri is a census town in Mukerian tahsil of Hoshiarpur district, Punjab. It contains the site of Datarpur, capital of the former Datarpur State. As of 2011, it has a population of 5,722, in 1,196 households.

== History ==
Rakri contains the site of Datarpur, which was capital of the former Datarpur State. Datarpur is said to have been founded around the year 1500.

Rakri was first reclassified as a non-statutory census town for the 2011 census (previously it had been designated as a village).

== Demographics ==
As of 2011, Rakri had a population of 5,722, in 1,196 households. This population was 50.8% male (2,908) and 49.2% female (2,814). The 0-6 age group numbered 566 (286 male and 280 female), or 9.9% of the total population. 1,265 residents were members of Scheduled Castes, or 22.1% of the total.

The 1981 census recorded Rakri as having a population of 4,270 people (2,813 male and 2,087 female), in 710 households and 710 physical houses.

The 1961 census recorded Rakri (as "Rakri maruf Datarpur") with a total population of 3,029 people (1,548 male and 1,481 female), in 577 households and 577 physical houses. It then had 2 hospitals and a post office.

== Economy ==
Among the most important commodities produced in Rakri are shoes and wooden products. As of 2009, Rakri had 1 nationalised bank, 0 private commercial banks, 1 cooperative bank, and 1 agricultural credit society.

== Infrastructure ==
As of 2011, Rakri has 1 hospital with 8 beds, 5 medicine shops, 10 schools teaching at the primary level and 3 teaching at the secondary level, and 1 public library. Water is stored in overhead tank(s), with a total capacity of 500 kilolitres. The town does not have a local fire department; the nearest one is at Talwara, 10 km away.
