= Rakri, Madhya Pradesh =

Village in Madhya Pradesh, India

Rakri
- Village
- Location in Madhya Pradesh, India
- Coordinates: 24.6002341°N 81.8597447°E
- Country: India
- State: Madhya Pradesh
- District: Rewa
- Tehsil: Mauganj

Area
  - Total: 13.863 km^{2} (5.353 sq mi)

Population (2011)
  - Total: 1,755
  - Density: 126.6/km^{2} (327.9/sq mi)
- Time zone: UTC+5:30 (IST)

Rakri (Rakrī), also spelled Rakari, is a village in Mauganj block of Rewa district, Madhya Pradesh. As of 2011, it had a population of 1,755, in 411 households.

== Demographics ==
As of 2011, Rakri had a population of 1,755, in 411 households. This population was 50.7% male (890) and 49.3% female (865). The 0-6 age group numbered 277 (147 male and 130 female), or 15.8% of the total population. 425 residents were members of Scheduled Castes, or 24.2% of the total.

The 1981 census recorded Rakri (as "Rakari") as having a population of 903 people, in 151 households.

The 1961 census recorded Rakri (as "Rakari") with a total population of 513 people (257 male and 256 female), in 112 households and 104 physical houses. The area of the village was given as 3,426 acres.

== Infrastructure ==
As of 2011, Rakri had 1 primary school; it did not have any healthcare facilities. Drinking water was provided by tap, well, and hand pump; there were no public toilets. The village had a sub post office but no public library; there was at least some access to electricity for all purposes. Streets were made of kachcha materials.
