= Koláre =

Koláre Kóvár
- Municipality
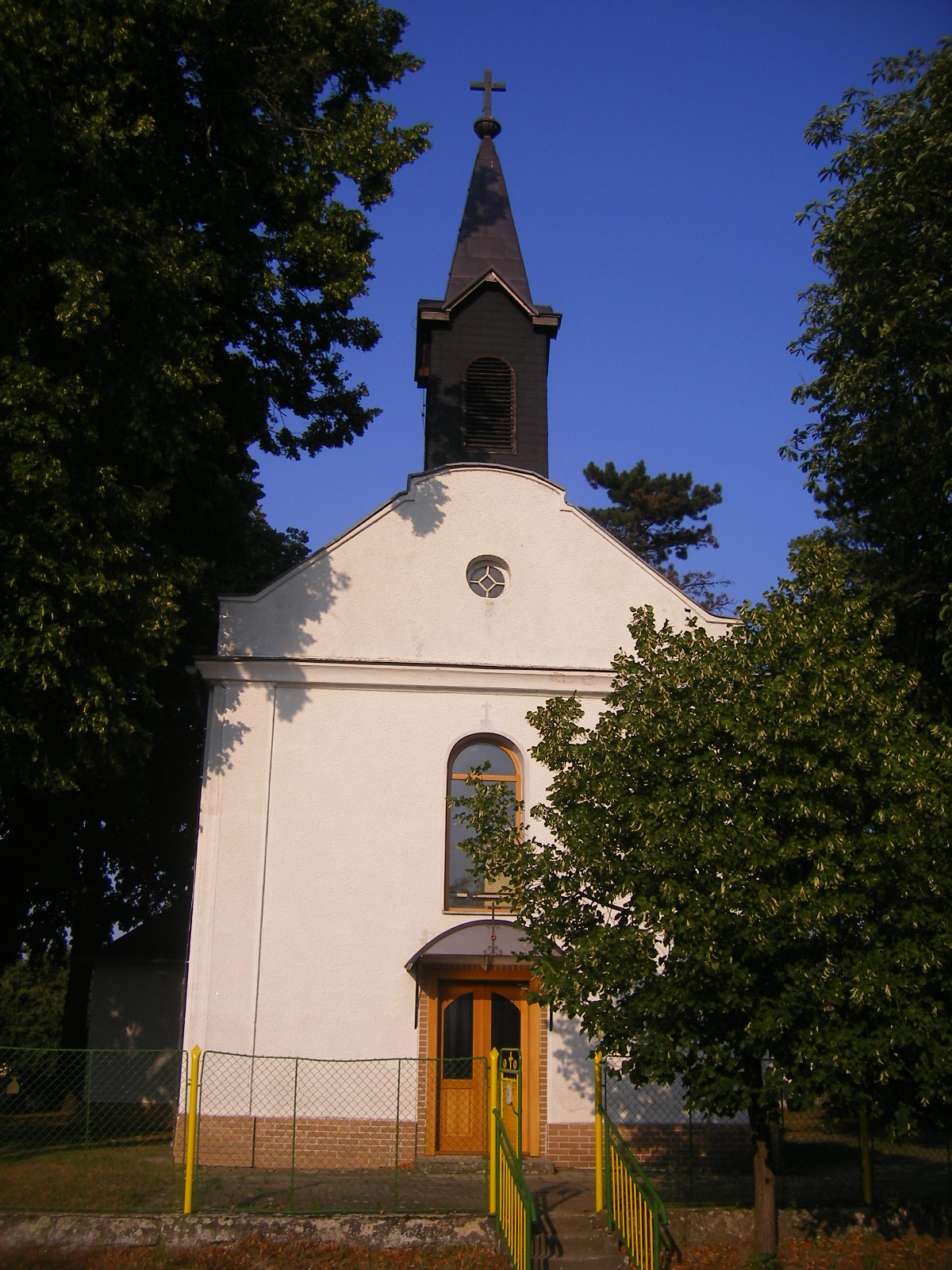

- Flag

- Location of Koláre in the Banská Bystrica Region Location of Koláre in Slovakia
- Coordinates: 48.07°N 19.25°E
- Country: Slovakia
- Region: Banská Bystrica Region
- District: Veľký Krtíš District
- First mentioned: 1257

Area
  - Total: 5.14 km^{2} (1.98 sq mi)
- Elevation: 145 m (476 ft)

Population (2025)
  - Total: 236
- Time zone: UTC+1 (CET)
  - Summer (DST): UTC+2 (CEST)
- Postal code: 991 09
- Area code: +421 47
- Vehicle registration plate (until 2022): VK
- Website: www.kolare.sk

Koláre (Hungarian: Kóvár) is a village and municipality in the Veľký Krtíš District of the Banská Bystrica Region of southern Slovakia.

== Geography ==
The municipality lies at an altitude of 145 metres (476 ft) and covers an area of 5.14 km^{2} (1.98 sq mi) (2025).

== Population ==
Population statistic (10 years)
Year	1995	2005	2015	2025
Count	322	295	262	236
Difference		−8.38%	−11.18%	−9.92%

Population statistic
Year	2024	2025
Count	240	236
Difference		−1.66%

It has a population of 236 people (31 December 2025).

=== Ethnicity ===
Census 2021 (1+ %)
Ethnicity	Number	Fraction
Hungarian	187	76.95%
Slovak	67	27.57%
Not found out	7	2.88%
Total	243	

In year 2021 was 243 people by ethnicity 187 as Hungarian, 67 as Slovak, 7 as Not found out, 1 as Romani and 1 as German.

Note on population: The difference values of population numbers in the table "Population statistic" and in the sections "Ethnicity" & "Religion" is caused by the use of various statistical methods.

=== Religion ===
Census 2021 (1+ %)
Religion	Number	Fraction
Roman Catholic Church	221	90.95%
None	15	6.17%
Not found out	5	2.06%
Total	243	

In year 2021 was 243 people by religion 221 from Roman Catholic Church, 15 from None, 5 from Not found out, 1 from Calvinist Church and 1 from Evangelical Church.

== Genealogical resources ==
The records for genealogical research are available at the state archive "Statny Archiv in Banska Bystrica, Slovakia"

- Roman Catholic church records (births/marriages/deaths): 1787-1900 (parish B)
- Lutheran church records (births/marriages/deaths): 1721-1862 (parish B)

== See also ==
- List of municipalities and towns in Slovakia
