= Mihailo Mihaljević =

Austrian major

Mihailo Mihaljević (Serbian: Михаило Михаљевић; 1748–1794) was an Austrian colonel of Serbian origin who led the Serbian Free Corps during the Austro-Turkish War.

== Biography ==
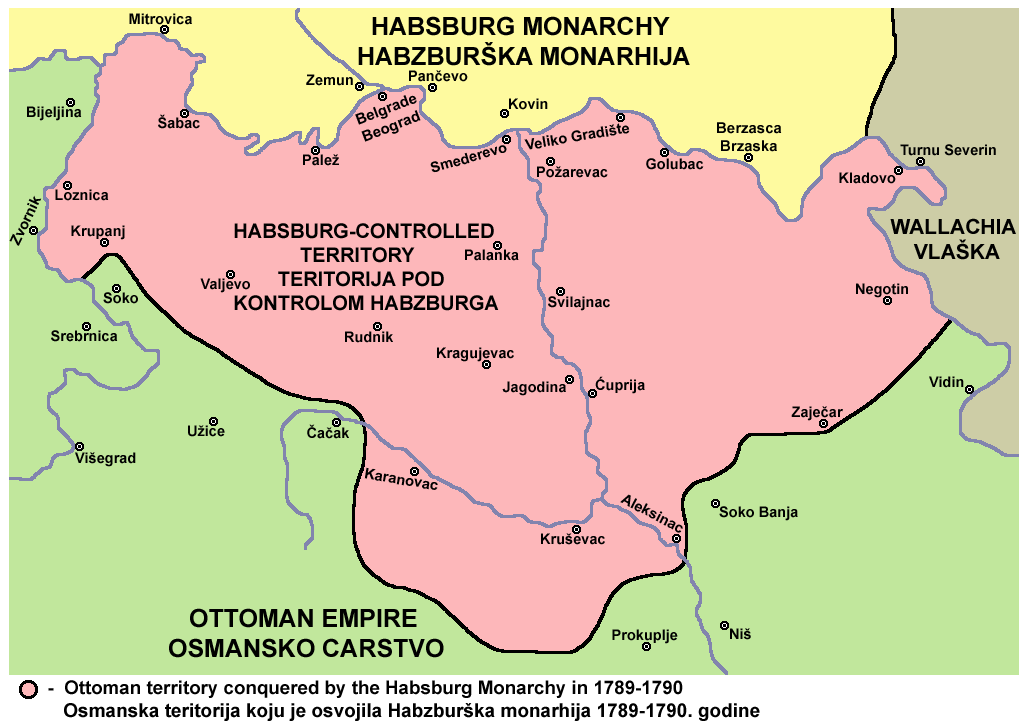
Map of the territories controlled by the Serbian Free Corps between 1789–1790.

Mihailo Mihaljević graduated from cadet school, and then served in a Petrovaradin regiment which was part of the Habsburg Military Frontier. He was a Slavonian general command for several years with the rank of major and later colonel in the Imperial Austrian Army.

In the operations of the Austrian army in 1789, with the frigate Stanko, he prepared the attack on Belgrade via the Danube river, and then took part in the occupation of Paraćin, Jagodina, Ćuprija, Karanovac, Kruševac and Aleksinac, all in modern Serbia. Among the many volunteers who enlisted in the corps were Aleksa Nenadović, Karađorđe Petrović, Stanko Arambašić, the prominent Radič Petrović and the most distinguished of all, Koča Anđelković. The Orthodox clergy in Serbia supported the rebellion.

Koča's militia quickly took over Palanka and Batočina, attacked Kragujevac, and reached the Constantinople road, cutting off the Ottoman army from the Sanjak of Niš and Sanjak of Vidin.

Ultimately, the aforementioned Serbian volunteer corps had the legacy of promoting the creation of future militias, particularly in the First Serbian Uprising headed by Karađorđe.

In 1792, Colonel Mihaljević went on to organize the Serbian–Slavonian Freikorps with which he participated in the French Revolutionary Wars; while serving in that campaign, he was killed on 26 April 1794.

== Sources ==
- Ćorović, Vladimir (2001) [1997]. "Kočina krajina". Историја српског народа (in Serbian). Belgrade: Јанус.
- Scheis, Joh. Bapt. (1846). "Biographie: Michael Baron von Mihalievits". Streffleurs österreichische militärische Zeitschrift. L.W. Seidel. pp. 282–299.
- Vojna enciklopedija, Volume 5. 1962. p. 453.
