= Habsburg Serbia =

Habsburg Serbia may refer to several periods and territories in the history of Serbia:

- Habsburg-occupied Serbia (1686–1691), temporary Habsburg occupation of central Serbia (1686–1691)
- Kingdom of Serbia (1718–1739), crown land of the Habsburg Empire (1718-1739)
- Habsburg-occupied Serbia (1788–1791), temporary Habsburg occupation of central Serbia (1788–1791)
- Serbian Vojvodina, Serbian region in Habsburg Empire (1848-1849)
- Voivodeship of Serbia and Banat of Temeschwar, crown land of the Habsburg Empire (1849-1860)
- Austro-Hungarian occupation of Serbia, Habsburg-occupied Serbia (1915-1918)

== See also ==
- Serbia (disambiguation)
- Ottoman Serbia (disambiguation)
- Moravian Serbia (disambiguation)
