= Kurilovo, Moscow =

Kurilovo Курилово
- Settlement
- Location within Moscow Location within Russia
- Coordinates: 55°22′25″N 37°22′36″E
- Country: Russia
- Region: Moscow
- Administrative okrug: Troitsky Administrative Okrug
- Settlement: Shchapovskoye Settlement
- Time zone: UTC+3:00

Kurilovo (Russian: Курилово) is a rural locality (a settlement) in Shchapovskoye Settlement of Troitsky Administrative Okrug, Moscow, Russia. Population: 1,647 (2010 census); 2,371 (2002 census);

== Geography ==
Kurilovo is located at the intersection of the Moscow Small Ring Road with the Varshavskoye Highway, about 50 km (31 mi) southwest of the center of Moscow. The nearest settlements are the villages of Satino-Russkoye and Satino-Tatarskoye.

In Kurilovo, there is secondary school No. 2075 in Moscow.
