= Kurilovo, Vladimir Oblast =

Kurilovo Курилово
- Village
- Location within Vladimir Oblast Location within Russia
- Coordinates: 56°05′N 39°58′E
- Country: Russia
- Region: Vladimir Oblast
- District: Sobinsky District
- Time zone: UTC+3:00

Kurilovo (Russian: Курилово) is a rural locality (a village) and the administrative center of Kurilovskoye Rural Settlement, Sobinsky District, Vladimir Oblast, Russia. The population was 718 as of 2010. There are 9 streets.

== Geography ==
Kurilovo is located 14 km north of Sobinka (the district's administrative centre) by road. Karacharovo is the nearest rural locality.
