= Koča Anđelković =

Serbian military leader (1755–1788)

Korun "Koča" Anđelković
- Born: c. 1755; Panjevac
- Died: c. November 1788 (aged 32-33); Tekija
- Military career
- Allegiance: Habsburg monarchy
- Branch: Volunteer militia
- Service years: 1775–1788
- Rank: Captain
- Nickname: "Koča"

Korun "Koča" Anđelković (Serbian Cyrillic: Коча Анђелковић, c. 1755 – 7 September 1788), known as Captain Koča (Kapetan Koča), was a Serbian military leader who served as commander of the Serbian Free Corps, the Habsburg military unit that fought the Ottomans during the Austro-Turkish War (1787–91).

== Life ==
Korun Anđelković was born around 1755 in the Moravian village of Panjevac (today Kočino Selo), where his father, Anđelko Petrović, moved after fleeing Albanian tyranny in the Pashalik of Scutari.

At that time, Serbian volunteer detachments were being formed in Austria, the Serbian Free Corps was under the command of Major Mihaljević. Before the beginning of the war, Koča and his brother Petar joined the volunteers in the company of Radič Petrović, the three men took part in both Austrian expeditions against Belgrade in 1787 and 1788.

In 1788 an uprising was organised in the Sanjak of Smederevo by the Serbs, Kara-George (Karađorđe) was one of them and Captain Koča led the group, the liberated territory became known as Kočina Krajina (Koča's country). The area became part of Habsburg-occupied Serbia (1788–1791).

Koča led more raids in Pomoravlje, and it is known to have carried out three major ambushes on Turkish detachments. For his service, he received the rank of captain from Austrian Emperor Joseph II and was awarded a gold medal for bravery.

Koča was captured by the Turks near Brzaska on 7 September 1788, he was taken to Tekija and tortured along with 30 of his men, he was then executed through public impalement.

== Legacy ==
The village where he was born, Panjevac, was renamed Kočino Selo in 1930 in his honor.
