= Rakari =

Coordinates: 44°13′56″N 20°09′04″E

- Village (Selo)
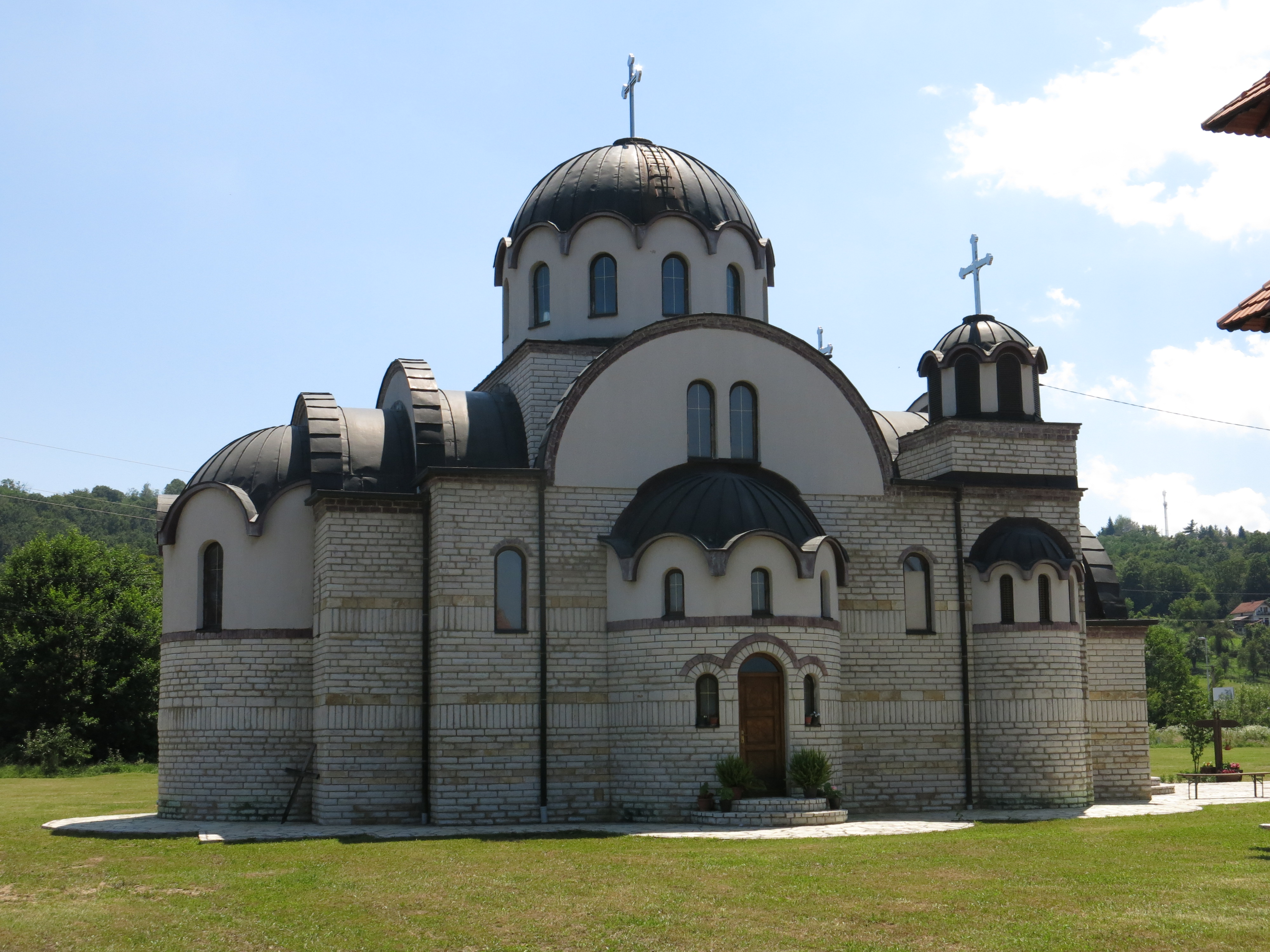
- Church of the Fiery Mary, Rakari Village
- Interactive map of Rakari
- Country: Serbia
- District: Kolubara District
- Municipality: Mionica
- Time zone: UTC+1 (CET)
  - Summer (DST): UTC+2 (CEST)

Rakari is a village situated in Mionica municipality in Serbia.
