= Treaty of Sistova =

Treaty ending the Austro-Turkish War of 1787–91

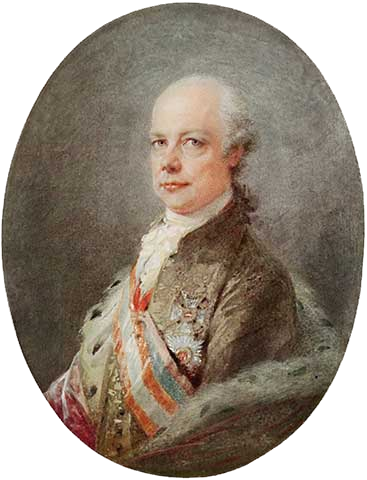
Leopold II

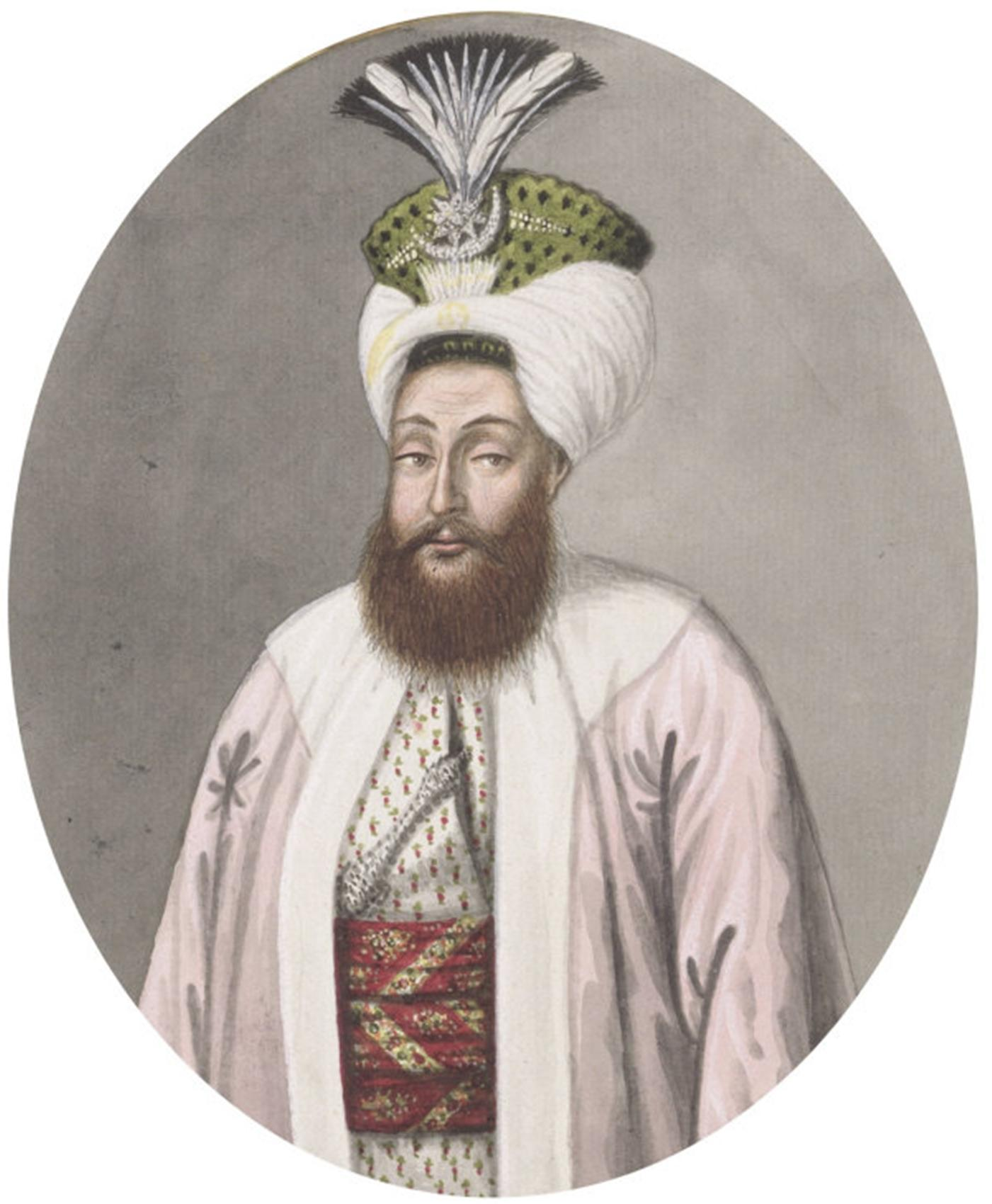
Selim III

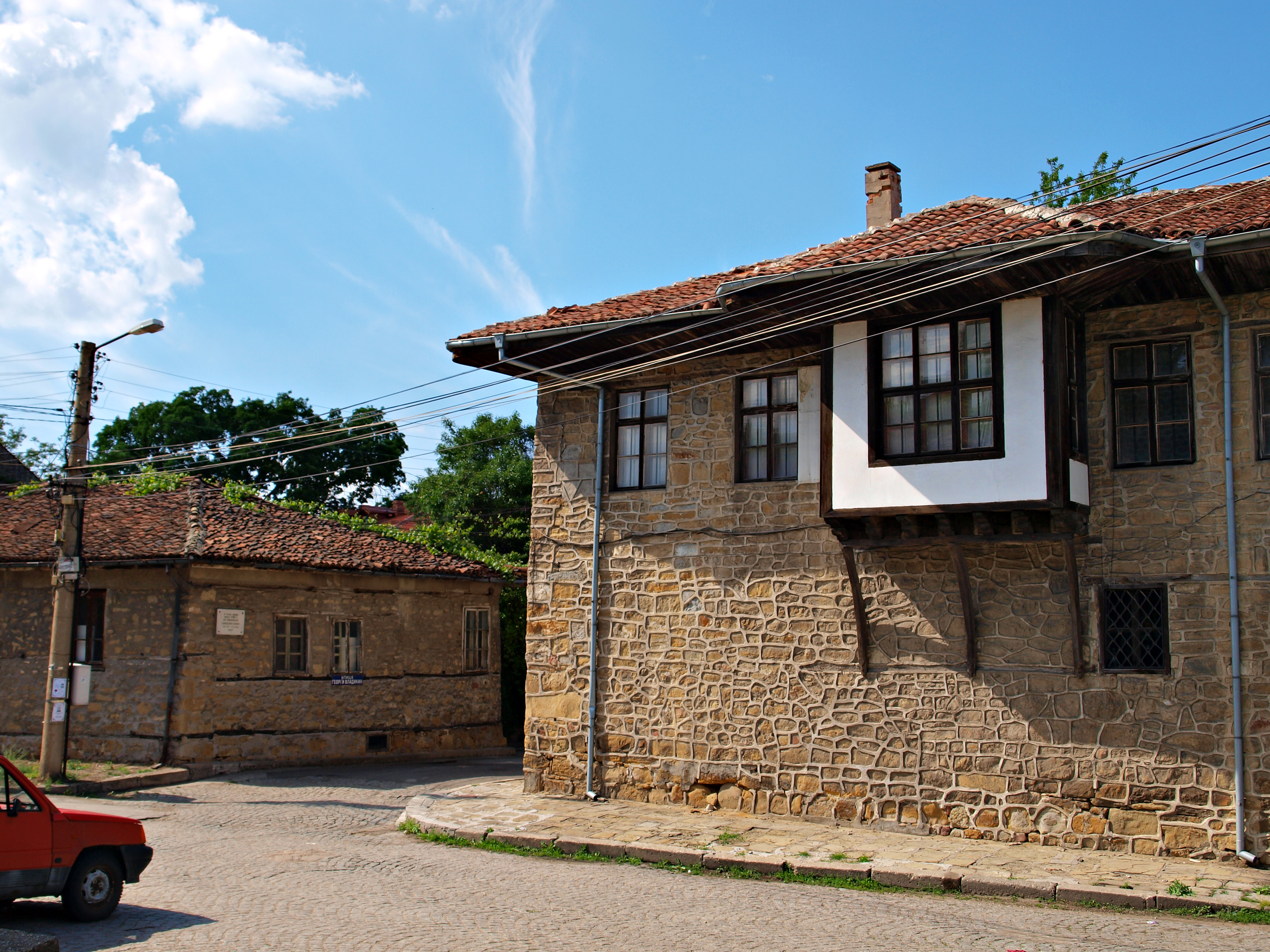
The treaty was signed in the little house to the left in modern Svishtov, Bulgaria

The Treaty of Sistova ended the last Austro-Turkish war (1787–91). Brokered by Great Britain, Prussia and the Netherlands, it was signed in Sistova (modern Svishtov) in Bulgaria on 4 August 1791. The treaty was written in French and Turkish.

== Background ==
The Habsburg monarchy had been pushed back in the first year of the war but then liberated Belgrade and gained other victory near Calafat in 1790. Austria's ally, Russia, had also been very successful, but Austria was threatened with invasion by Prussia. Also, the French Revolution had broken out and demanded Austria's urgent attention. Under that pressure, Austria accepted only very meagre gains from the war: only the town of Orsova (modern Orșova) and several small places (Cetingrad, Drežnik, Lapac, Srb) on the Croatian frontier were ceded to the Habsburg Monarchy.

This treaty ended the Ottoman–Habsburg wars. Austria did not participate in the Russian-led wars against the Ottomans during the 19th and 20th centuries. Both countries would eventually face France in the War of the Second Coalition, despite fighting different campaigns against the same enemy in Central Europe and Egypt. During the Second Ottoman–Egyptian War, Austria, along with Britain, saved its old rival from early collapse against Muhammad Ali of Egypt's Egypt. The two countries would end up teaming against the Allies of World War I, with the Ottomans sending troops to Galicia and the Austro-Hungarians to Gaza before collapsing together.

With the Turkish war ended, Austria joined with Prussia in the Declaration of Pillnitz on 27 August. Austria renounced any expansion at the expense of the Ottoman Empire. In return, Prussia promised not to expand to the east and not to support the Brabant Revolution. Both countries pledged to intervene in France if all of the various powers of Europe agreed that it was necessary.

== See also ==
- Habsburg-occupied Serbia (1788–91)
