= Radič Petrović =

Serbian military leader

- Born: c.1738
- Died: c.1816
- Allegiance: Habsburg monarchy
- Branch: Volunteer militia
- Rank: Vojvoda

Radič Petrović (Serbian Cyrillic: Радич Петровић; 1738–1816), known as Captain Radič (kapetan Radič), was a Serbian Revolutionary commander (vojvoda), earlier a Military Frontier guard and volunteer in the Austro-Turkish War (1787–91).

== Early life and Habsburg service ==
Petrović was born in Siokovac in the Levač region, and moved to Ostružnica by the Sava. Many Serbs fled across the Danube and Sava into the Military Frontier of the Habsburg monarchy after increased Ottoman oppression. Petrović and his family moved to Syrmia, and he entered Habsburg service, becoming a border guard. With the outbreak of the Austro-Turkish War (1787–91), he joined the Serbian Free Corps, a Serb volunteer unit fighting the Ottomans in central Serbia, consequently occupied by the Habsburgs (1788–92). For his operation, managing to open the Belgrade Fortress Gates, he was awarded the rank of captain. For his service during the war, he was awarded knighthood by Leopold II in 1792. He also served as a volunteer fighting the French. He used his military experience to train Serb rebels in the First Serbian Uprising (1804–13). The leader of the uprising, Karađorđe, who had fought in Petrović's volunteer unit, viewed him as his foster father.

== Serbian Revolution ==
Petrović returned to Serbia (the Sanjak of Smederevo) in 1804 after the outbreak of the uprising. He distinguished himself throughout the uprising through military skills and prowess. After the liberation of Karanovac (now Kraljevo) in 1805, Karađorđe appointed him vojvoda (general). In March 1806, Ottoman commander Suleiman Pasha defeated the Serbian rebel band of Radič Petrović near the Studenica Monastery. He was seriously wounded during the Siege of Belgrade (1806), and became permanently hunched. After recovering, he stayed in Belgrade, and in 1808 became a magistrate. In the following years he took part in the fortification and defence of Ćuprija. After the Ottoman suppression of the uprising in 1813, he lived in Syrmia under very modest conditions. After the outbreak of the Second Serbian Uprising (1815), Radič Petrović returned to Serbia in 1816. His return was not seen positively by Miloš Obrenović, the new Serbian leader, due to Petrović's close ties to Karađorđe (now exiled) and the fear of mutiny against Obrenović. He was quickly captured and killed along with Petar Nikolajević Moler by the Ottomans, at close to 80 years of age.

== Personal life ==
Petrović was regarded a great patriot and hero. He was physically strong and tall, described as very courageous, and was wounded several times in battles, allegedly having 30 wounds. He married three times, and from the first marriage he had two sons, and from the third, a daughter.

== Legacy ==
In the Serbian historical drama TV series Vuk Karadžić (1987), Radič Petrović was played by Milan Srdoč.

== See also ==
- List of Serbian Revolutionaries

== Sources ==
- Karadžić, Vuk (1829). "Даница". 4. Vienna: 11–16. ( Public domain)
- Milićević, Milan (1888). Поменик знаменитих људи у српскога народа новијега доба. Srpska kraljevska štamparija. pp. 539–541. ( Public domain)
- Nenadović, Matija (1893). Kovačević, Ljubomir (ed.). Мемоари Матије Ненадовића [Memoirs of Matija Nenadović]. Srpska književna zadruga. pp. 32–33. ( Public domain)
- Nenadović, Konstantin N. (1903) [1883]. Život i dela velikog Đorđa Petrovića Kara-Đorđa Vrhovnog Vožda, oslobodioca i Vladara Srbije i život njegovi Vojvoda i junaka: Kao gradivo za Srbsku Istoriju od godine 1804 do 1813 i na dalje. Sloboda. pp. 537–538. ( Public domain)
- Otočanin, Joksim Nović (1866). Капетан Радич Петровић и покрштеница Зорка. Novi Sad: Епископска књигопечатња. ( Public domain)
- Rudić, Srđan; Pavlović, Lela (2016). Srpska revolucija i obnova državnosti Srbije: Dvesta godina od Drugog srpskog ustanka [Serbian Revolution and Renewal of Serbian Statehood: Two Hundred Years since the Second Serbian Uprising]. Istorijski institut, Beograd; Međuopštinski istorijski arhiv, Čačak. pp. 57–. ISBN 978-86-7743-116-7.
