= Miloje Đak =

Miloje Popović-Đak (Serbian Cyrillic: Милоје Ђак, c. 1769–1825) was the leader of an eponymous failed rebellion – Đakova buna or "Đak's rebellion" – in 1824.

== Biography ==
Miloje was born in Kusadak, in the Jasenica part of Smederevska Palanka. Originally from Kosovo, he attended school and thus received the nickname Đak (student), which eventually was added to his original surname, Popović. He was a priest for a short time, and then worked as a cattle trader. During the First Serbian Uprising, he was the secretary of voivode Vujica Vulićević, and after the collapse of the uprising in 1813, he fled to Germany. Two years later, in 1815, he returned home to trade cattle.

At the end of January, 1825, the Đakovo revolt broke out in Azanja, in the Smederevo nahija, in response to the oppression of local authorities and unfair taxes. Requests for change were made at the meeting in Topola on February 3 and sent to Prince Miloš Obrenović. A crowd gathered around Đak, shouting that they were ready to fight. As early as February 5, Miloš's army, led by Toma Vučić Perišić, intercepted the rebels near Topola and easily defeated them. Đak was wounded but he managed to escape. Simultaneously, the revolt began to spread to other nahiya, leading to Prince Miloš's strong reaction: Đak was captured in Mali Mokri Lug and executed on February 9. The riots stopped in the following days.

Đak was buried in the Pinosava Monastery, Kusadak, near the grave of Vujica Vulićević.
