= Đuša Vulićević =

Dušan "Đuša" Vulićević (Azanja, 1771 - Smederevo, 1805) was a voivode (duke) in Smederevo and one of the first Serbian revolutionary organizers of the First Serbian Uprising. He was one of the first victims in the battles for the liberation of Smederevo.

As a respectable merchant, Đuša was a legitimately elected leader of the insurgent Serbs from the Smederevo nahija and he led his people in the fight against the Turks. Petar Jokić, the commander of Karađorđe's personal guard, states that there were 200 of them, and with Dr. Miroslav Djordjević the number of insurgents increased to 400, and that, according to an Austrian report, on 25 February, Karađorđe was in Azanja with his main detachment. He was also accompanied by Belgrade Metropolitan Leontije, Pavle (Stojko) Krivokuća of Adžibegovac and other insurgents. The same author says "how Karađorđe was in close contact with Đuša and that he first transmitted Karađorđe's orders to the Pozarevac nahija through him. According to these instructions, the uprising spread in eastern Serbia as well." After a year and a half of war, the Duke of Smederevo, Đuša Vulićević, died bravely in a battle with the Turks on the bridge (near today's church) in Smederevo. Historian Milan Milićević writes that he was first buried in the gate near the Old Church in Krnjevo and that the following year the remains were transferred to the Pinosava Church, between Azanja and Kusadak, where they are still located today. The death of Duke Đuša and the conquest of Smederevo was sung in the song "Karađorđe took Smederevo" by Joksim Nović-Otočanin back in 1864.

After the death of Duke Đuša, the people of the Smederevo and region chose Vujica Vulićević, Đuša's younger brother, as their leader.

Today, Đušina Street in Belgrade carries the name in his honour.

== Origin ==
According to scholar Borivoje Drobnjaković (1890–1961), the Vulićević family hailed from Kosovo. The grandfather of Vujica and Đuša had two sons, Vulić and Đorđe, so the Vulićevićs and Đorđevićs were born. Upon arrival, their houses were in the area of today's village center, more precisely in the lower part near the bus station. Like other insurgent leaders, they were engaged in the trade before the uprising, thus gaining capital to fight the Turks. This put them in a position to be one of the organizers of the First Serbian Uprising.
