= Azanja =

Azanja Азања
- Village (Selo)
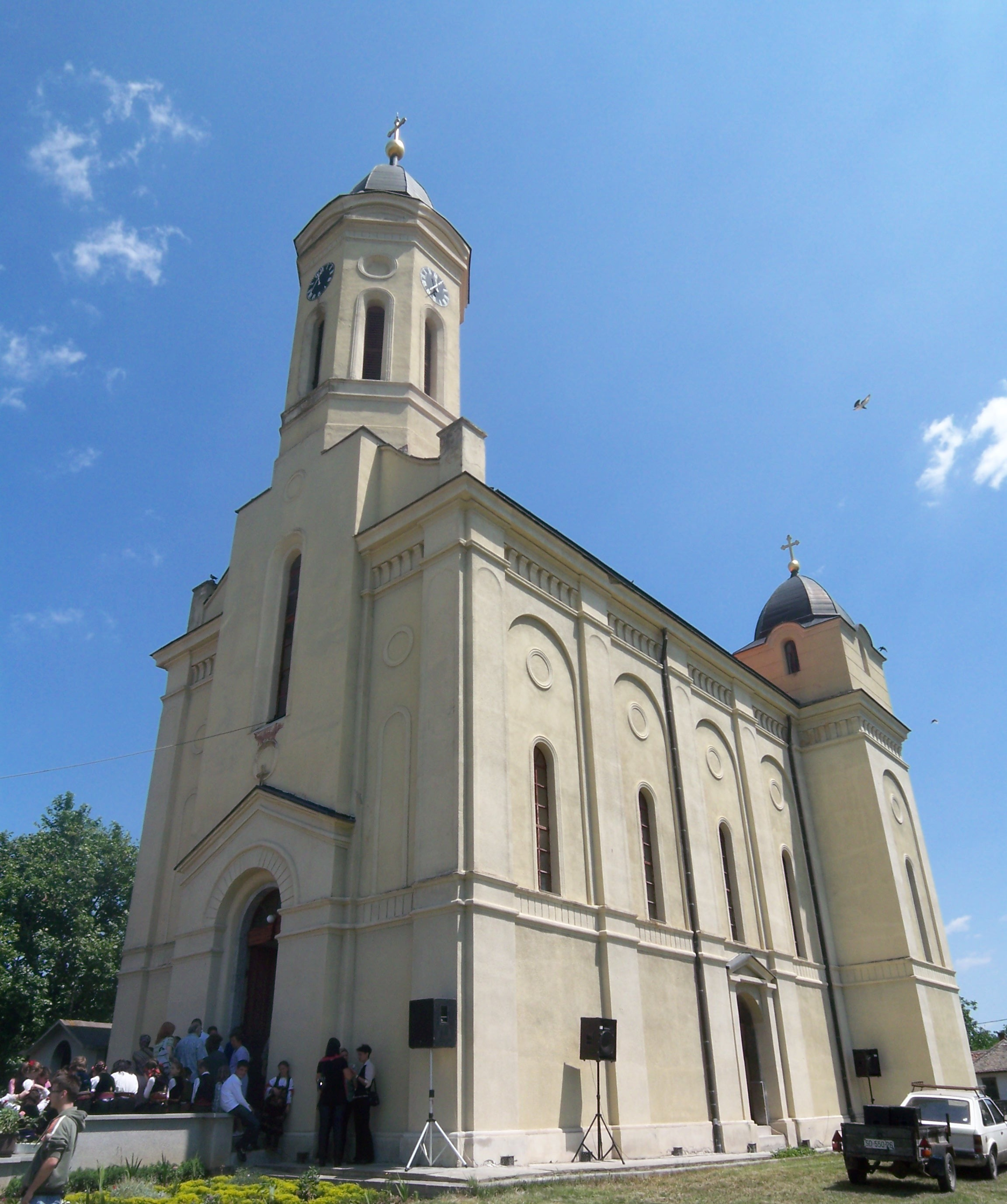

- Location within Serbia
- Country: Serbia
- Region: Southern and Eastern Serbia
- District: Podunavlje
- Municipality: Smederevska Palanka

Population (2011)
  - Total: 4,014
- Time zone: UTC+1 (CET)
  - Summer (DST): UTC+2 (CEST)

Azanja (Serbian Cyrillic: Азања) is a village in Central Serbia, in the municipality of Smederevska Palanka. It lies in the region of Great Morava valley, on rivers of Jezava and Jasenica. Azanja is 160 meters above mean sea level. With 4,014 residents, it is one of largest villages in Central Serbia.

== History ==
The name Azanja origin from the Thracian (Thraco-Cimmerian and Phrygian) name "Azan". Azan first time appears in the Greek myth of Arcas and Ereto, as the name for one of their sons. The Turkish city of Çavdarhisar in ancient Phrygia, through history, had the almost identical name - "Aizanoi". From 1850 to 1950 it was known as the biggest village in Serbia and later as the biggest village of ex Yugoslavia. In 1950, when Azanja reached population of 12,500 it was split into three parts, Vlaški Do, Grčac and Azanja. Because of the large population, in 1922 it received the status of a town (varošica).

== Culture and education ==
Its culture happenings are mostly during the religious holidays. Village fair on Trnova Petka (8 August) has been held every year since the construction of the church in 1885. Since 1997, an ethno-culture manifestation "The days of Azanja bakings" is held during the fair, in 2006 the night of poetry and picture exhibitions. were added to the fair. There was also a "Gipsy's night" in Azanja in 2007.

There is one elementary school in Azanja, called "Radomir Lazić", Amateur Theatre Azanja and KUD Azanja (KUD - culture and arts society). At the end of 2005, a library was opened. Azanja has one football team, Šumadija.

Serbian Orthodox Church of Saints Cosmas and Damian is located in the centre of the village.

== Demography ==
Population change during the 20th century

According to the data from 2011, Azanja had a population of 4014 people. There are 3,370 adults (18+), and the average age in Azanja is 45.0 years (43.1 years for men and 46.9 of woman lifetime). In 1784, according to Ottoman records, Azanja had 14 Christian households, in 1942 there were 1,308 households and in 2002 there was 1,408. One family averages 3.35 persons (2002).
