= Stojačak =

Stojačak Стојачак
- Village (Selo)
- Location within Serbia
- Coordinates: 44°19′15″N 20°58′25″E
- Country: Serbia
- Region: Southern and Eastern Serbia
- District: Podunavlje
- Municipality: Smederevska Palanka

Population (2011)
  - Total: 365
- Time zone: UTC+1 (CET)
  - Summer (DST): UTC+2 (CEST)

Stojačak is a village in the municipality of Smederevska Palanka, Serbia. According to the 2011 census, the village has a population of 365 people.
