= Kusadak railway station =

Railway station in Serbia

Coordinates: 44°22′33″N 20°49′52″E

Kusadak railway station is a railway station in Kusadak, Smederevska Palanka, Serbia. It is located in the settlement Kusadak in the municipality of Smederevska Palanka. The railroad continues to Glibovac in one, and Kovačevac in the other direction. Kusadak railway station consists of four railway tracks.

== See also ==
- Serbian Railways
