= Cerovac (Smederevska Palanka) =

Cerovac Церовац
- Village (Selo)
- Location within Serbia
- Coordinates: 44°19′48″N 20°52′01″E
- Country: Serbia
- Region: Southern and Eastern Serbia
- District: Podunavlje
- Municipality: Smederevska Palanka

Population (2002)
  - Total: 1,177
- Time zone: UTC+1 (CET)
  - Summer (DST): UTC+2 (CEST)

Cerovac is a village in the municipality of Smederevska Palanka, Serbia. According to the 2002 census, the village has a population of 1177 people.
