= Bačinac =

Bačinac Бачинац
- Village (Selo)
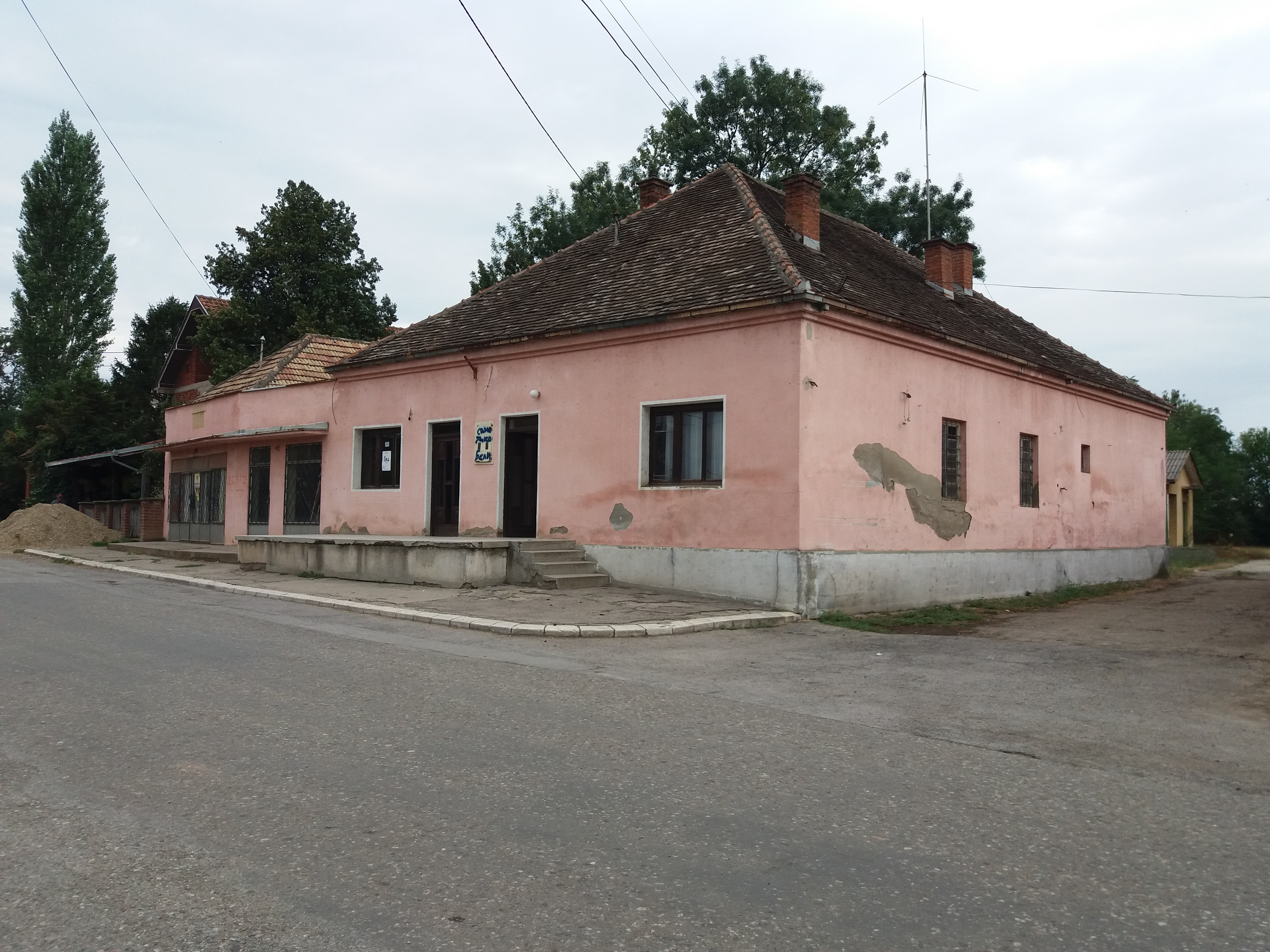

- Location within Serbia
- Coordinates: 44°30′28″N 20°54′59″E
- Country: Serbia
- Region: Southern and Eastern Serbia
- District: Podunavlje
- Municipality: Smederevska Palanka

Population (2011)
  - Total: 683
- Time zone: UTC+1 (CET)
  - Summer (DST): UTC+2 (CEST)

Bačinac is a village in the municipality of Smederevska Palanka, Serbia. According to the 2002 census, the village has a population of 683 people.
