= Baničina =

Baničina Баничина
- Village (Selo)
- Location within Serbia
- Coordinates: 44°17′29″N 20°55′47″E
- Country: Serbia
- Region: Southern and Eastern Serbia
- District: Podunavlje
- Municipality: Smederevska Palanka

Population (2002)
  - Total: 1,189
- Time zone: UTC+1 (CET)
  - Summer (DST): UTC+2 (CEST)

Baničina is a village in the municipality of Smederevska Palanka, Serbia. According to the 2002 census, the village has a population of 1189 people.
