= Ratari (Smederevska Palanka) =

Ratari Ратари
- Village (Selo)
- Location within Serbia
- Coordinates: 44°21′10″N 20°49′50″E
- Country: Serbia
- Region: Southern and Eastern Serbia
- District: Podunavlje
- Municipality: Smederevska Palanka

Population (2011)
  - Total: 1,773
- Time zone: UTC+1 (CET)
  - Summer (DST): UTC+2 (CEST)

Ratari is a village in the municipality of Smederevska Palanka, Serbia. According to the 2011 census, the village has a population of 1,773 people.
