= Pridvorice =

Pridvorice Придворице
- Village
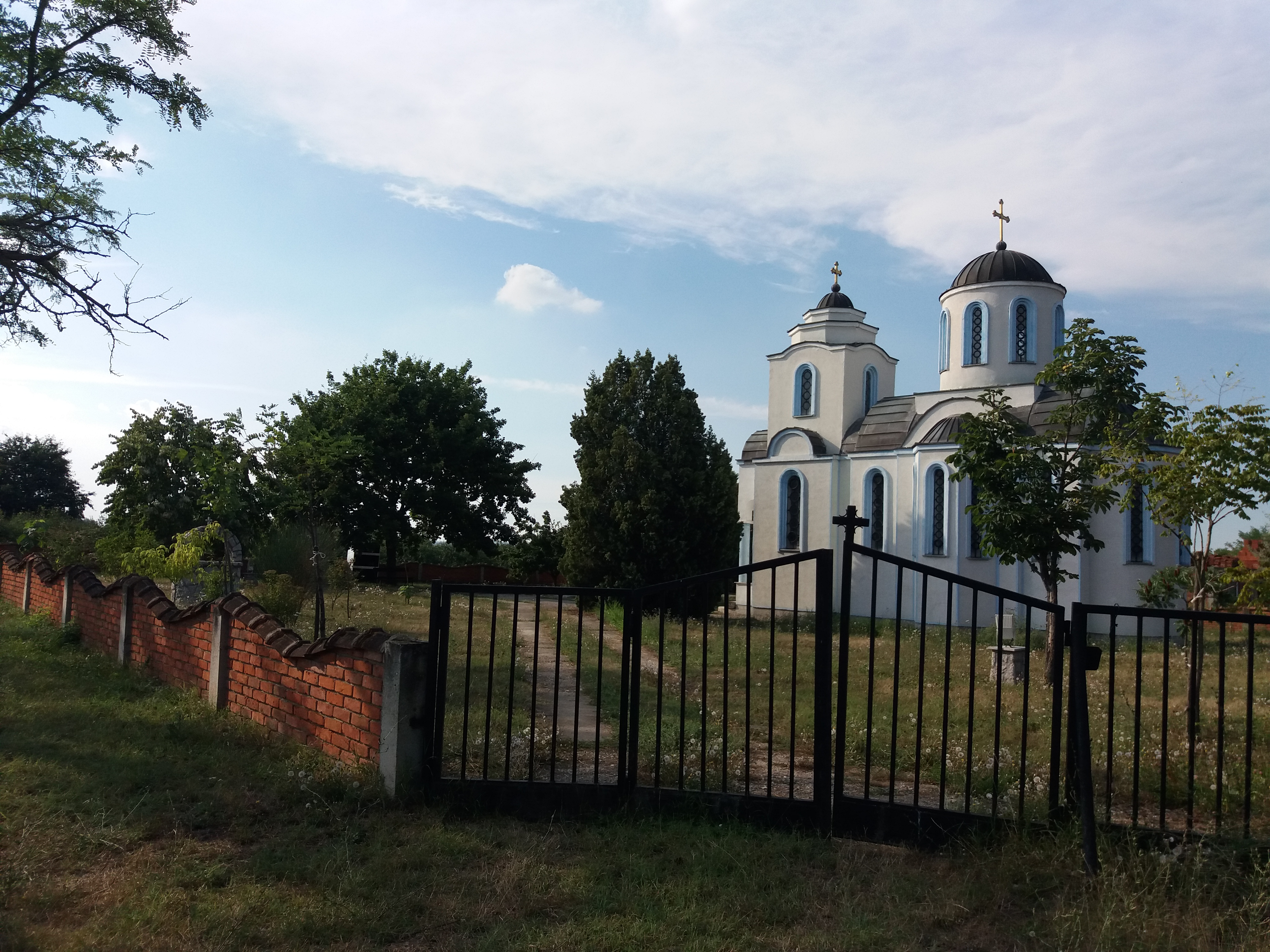
- Church of Saint George

- Location within Serbia
- Coordinates: 44°20′26″N 20°54′09″E
- Country: Serbia
- Statistical region: Southern and Eastern Serbia
- District: Podunavlje
- Municipality: Smederevska Palanka

Population (2022)
  - Total: 687
- Time zone: UTC+1 (CET)
  - Summer (DST): UTC+2 (CEST)

Pridvorice (Serbian Cyrillic: Придворице) is a village in the municipality of Smederevska Palanka, Podunavlje District, Serbia. According to the 2022 census, it had a population of 687.

The area around Pridvorice is associated with the medieval settlement of Nekudim, which served as a residence of Serbian rulers Stefan Lazarević and Đurađ Branković and as the centre of a military-administrative district during the Serbian Despotate.

== Geography ==
Pridvorice lies southwest of Smederevska Palanka, in the valley of the Jasenica river. The municipal government describes Pridvorice, together with nearby Glibovac, as one of the rural settlements closest to the urban area of Smederevska Palanka.

Drobnjaković described Pridvorice in the early 20th century as a compact roadside settlement on the left bank of the Jasenica, situated on a terrace along the road between Natalinci and Smederevska Palanka.

The municipal spatial plan places Pridvorice along the state road connecting Smederevska Palanka with Topola.

== History ==
=== Medieval Nekudim ===
The medieval settlement and court of Nekudim was located in the Jasenica valley near present-day Pridvorice. Historian Aleksandar Krstić notes that several archaeological sites containing traces of older buildings have been recorded in the areas of Pridvorice, Cerovac and Vodice, southwest of Smederevska Palanka.

The earliest known written reference to Nekudim dates to 1389, when a charter of King Sigismund of Hungary referred to a fortress called castrum Nicodem. During the 15th century, Nekudim served as one of the residences of despots Stefan Lazarević and Đurađ Branković. It was also the centre of the Nekudim vlast, a military-administrative territorial unit of the Serbian Despotate.

Several documents were issued by Serbian rulers at Nekudim. Đurađ Branković issued a charter there in 1428 confirming privileges previously granted to merchants from the Republic of Ragusa. The Burgundian traveller Bertrandon de la Broquière, who travelled through Serbia in 1433, also visited Nekudim and encountered Đurađ Branković and his entourage there.

Following the Ottoman conquest of Serbia in 1459, the Ottomans established a nahiyah named after Nekudim. By 1476, Nekudim itself had declined to a small settlement recorded as having 12 households.

Krstić records that the locality known as Jabučar, north or northeast of Pridvorice, had traditionally been associated with Nekudim. According to local tradition recorded by Borivoje Drobnjaković, a small church called Pridvorica once stood at Jabučar on land belonging to the Stošić family, and medieval Nekudim was believed to have been located there.

Krstić cautions, however, that the precise layout and location of the medieval fortress, court and settlement cannot be established without further archaeological investigation.

=== Development of Pridvorice ===
Drobnjaković recorded that Pridvorice was known as Šatronja (Serbian Cyrillic: Шатроња) in the early 19th century.

According to the same account, the village was divided into two parts, the Upper End (Serbian: Gornji kraj, also called Erski kraj) and the Lower End (Serbian: Donji kraj, also called Bugarski kraj).

The name of the modern settlement is traditionally associated with the former church of Pridvorica at Jabučar. This explanation is based on local tradition rather than documentary medieval evidence. Krstić notes that another possible explanation is the medieval term pridvorci, referring to a category of dependent population living near the court or administrative centre of an estate.

In an Ottoman register from 1476, a village named Pridvorica was recorded as belonging, like Nekudim, to the estate of the sanjak-bey of Smederevo. It contained 11 full households and one widow's household.

== Demographics ==
Pridvorice had more than 1,100 inhabitants in the middle of the 20th century. Its population has subsequently declined, from 1,124 inhabitants in 1981 to 870 in 2002, 781 in 2011 and 687 in 2022.

Population of Pridvorice
Census year	Population
1948	1,119
1953	1,135
1961	1,058
1971	1,080
1981	1,124
1991	957
2002	870
2011	781
2022	687

The figures for 1991 and 2002 shown above use the comparable census methodology employed by the Statistical Office of Serbia in its later census publications.

In the 2022 census, Pridvorice had 336 male and 351 female inhabitants. The same census recorded 186 families in the settlement.

== Education ==
Pridvorice has a branch department of the Olga Milošević Primary School in Smederevska Palanka. The school operates its main facility in Smederevska Palanka and branch departments in Pridvorice and Vodice.

The municipality also lists a separate contact for the school department in Pridvorice.

== Religion ==
The local Serbian Orthodox church is dedicated to Saint George. It belongs to the Jasenica deanery of the Eparchy of Šumadija. In April 2009, Bishop Jovan of Šumadija celebrated the Liturgy of the Presanctified Gifts at the church during a gathering of clergy from the deanery.

== Infrastructure and administration ==
Pridvorice forms a separate local community (Serbian: mesna zajednica) within the municipality of Smederevska Palanka.

The municipality also maintains a local administrative office serving the settlement.

In 2022, a 3.6 km extension of the municipal water-supply network was constructed through Pridvorice. The municipality stated that the project would allow approximately 100 households to connect to the municipal water system.

== See also ==
- Smederevska Palanka
- List of populated places in Serbia
