= Golobok =

Golobok Голобок
- Village (Selo)
- Location within Serbia
- Coordinates: 44°27′09″N 21°00′16″E
- Country: Serbia
- Region: Southern and Eastern Serbia
- District: Podunavlje
- Municipality: Smederevska Palanka

Population (2002)
  - Total: 2,396
- Time zone: UTC+1 (CET)
  - Summer (DST): UTC+2 (CEST)

Golobok is a village in the municipality of Smederevska Palanka, Serbia. According to the 2002 census, the village has a population of 2396 people.
