= Vlaški Do (Smederevska Palanka) =

Vlaški Do Влашки До
- Village (Selo)
- Location within Serbia
- Coordinates: 44°28′N 20°55′E
- Country: Serbia
- Region: Southern and Eastern Serbia
- District: Podunavlje
- Municipality: Smederevska Palanka

Population (2011)
  - Total: 975
- Time zone: UTC+1 (CET)
  - Summer (DST): UTC+2 (CEST)

Vlaški Do is a village in the municipality of Smederevska Palanka, Serbia. According to the 2011 census, the village has a population of 975 people.
