= Medvednjak =

Medvednjak (Serbian: Медведњак) is an archaeological site in central Serbia, in Šumadija region, 3 km (1.9 mi) from center of Smederevska Palanka.

The locality is situated in the village of Grčac. Just as the neighboring locality of Staro Selo, near Selevac, it belongs to the end of Neolithic and early Eneolithic, or the period 4500-3500 BC, during the developed and ending phase of the Vinča culture when the first evidence of metallurgy appeared. The culture then disappears as the population presumably migrated. Both settlements were large, spreading on 40 to 60 ha (99 to 148 acres). The most important artifacts, kept in the People's Museum in Smederevska Palanka, are the anthropomorphic figurines of high artistic and artisan value. One of the most valuable and considered unique is the one called "Woman in labor", due to its contracted position. In total, there are over 1,000 figurines, some complete, some damaged, but it is estimated that at least 3,000 of them are in personal collections. Among others, the research in Medvednjak was done by the archaeologists from the National Museum in Belgrade, Institute for Archaeology and People's Museum in Smederevska Palanka, University of California, Berkeley, Harvard University and Museo Archeologico from Udine, Italy.
