= Grčac =

Grčac Грчац
- Village (Selo)
- Location within Serbia
- Coordinates: 44°25′45″N 20°57′49″E
- Country: Serbia
- Region: Southern and Eastern Serbia
- District: Podunavlje
- Municipality: Smederevska Palanka

Population (2002)
  - Total: 1,176
- Time zone: UTC+1 (CET)
  - Summer (DST): UTC+2 (CEST)

Grčac is a village in the municipality of Smederevska Palanka, Serbia. According to the 2002 census, the village has a population of 1176 people.

In the village is the Neolithic and Eneolithic archaeologic site of Medvednjak.
