= Church of Saint Elijah, Smederevska Palanka =

Church of Saint Elijah
- Црква светог Илије
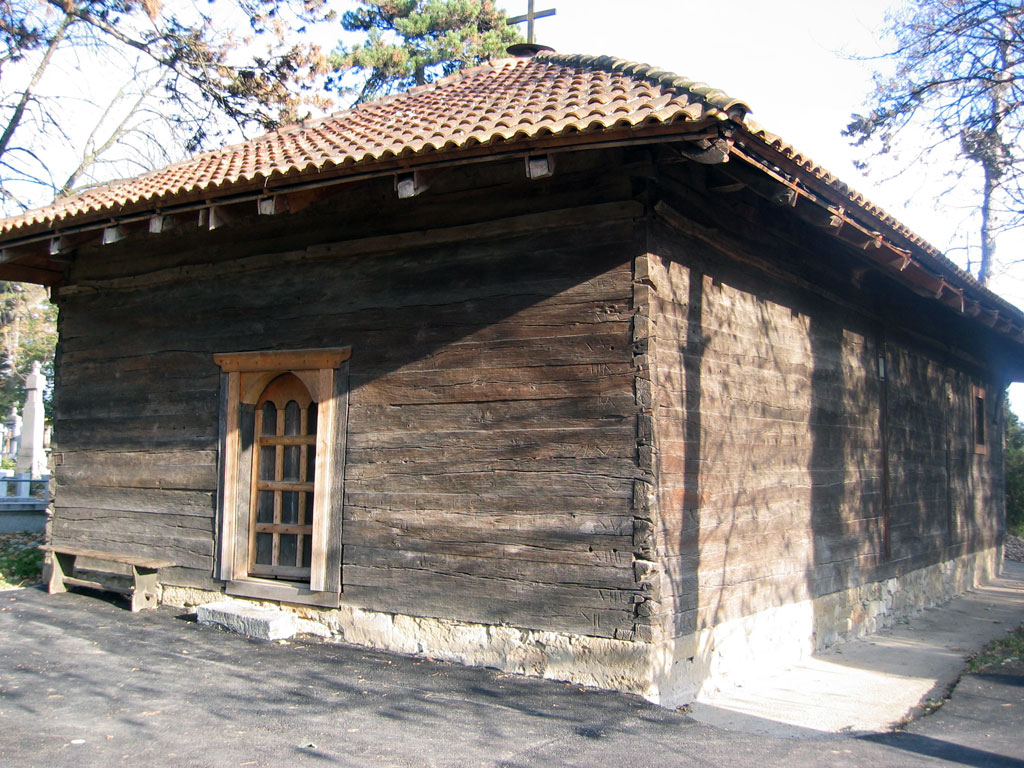
- Church of Saint Elijah
- Church of Saint Elijah
- 44°22′13″N 20°57′07″E
- Country: Serbia
- Denomination: Serbian Orthodox

History
- Dedication: Saint Elijah

Architecture
- Completed: 1827-1828

Administration
- Archdiocese: Eparchy of Šumadija

Cultural Heritage of Serbia
- Type: Cultural Monument of Great Importance
- Designated: 1983
- Reference no.: СК 550

The Church of Saint Elijah (Serbian: Црква светог Илије) is a wooden Serbian Orthodox church located in Smederevska Palanka, Serbia. Dedicated to Saint Elijah, it was constructed between 1827 and 1828. It is the largest wooden church in Serbia. It is one of two wooden churches in Smederevska Palanka.

== History ==
Construction of the church began in 1827 and was completed in 1828. According to the official account, the principal benefactor was Prince Miloš Obrenović. However, it remains uncertain whether he genuinely contributed the majority of the funds or if the patronage was attributed to him later, simply because the church was built during his rule. It is also unclear whether the funds, if provided, came from his personal wealth or from state resources.

Unlike most wooden churches in Serbia, which are typically situated in rural or remote areas, the Church of Saint Elijah was originally built in the center of Smederevska Palanka. In the late 1906, following the construction of a new masonry church dedicated to the Transfiguration in the town center, the wooden church was relocated to the old municipal cemetery, where it remains today.

== Protection ==
The Church has been under state protection since 1948, based on a decision issued by the Institute for the Protection and Scientific Study of Cultural Monuments of the People's Republic of Serbia (No. 2266/48 of 20 December 1948). It was officially entered into the local register of cultural monuments on 28 March 1983 and subsequently into the central register on 24 October 1983. It is classified as a Cultural Monuments of Great Importance.

== See also ==
- Eparchy of Šumadija
