= Kusadak =

Kusadak Кусадак
- Village (Selo)
- Location within Serbia
- Coordinates: 44°24′N 20°48′E
- Country: Serbia
- Region: Southern and Eastern Serbia
- District: Podunavlje
- Municipality: Smederevska Palanka

Population (2011)
  - Total: 4,886
- Time zone: UTC+1 (CET)
  - Summer (DST): UTC+2 (CEST)

Kusadak (Serbian Cyrillic: Кусадак) is a countryside village that is part of Smederevska Palanka in Central Serbia. It is located between it and Mladenovac. Rail-road Belgrade-Nish goes right across Kusadak and there are train stations on the territory of kusadak. It has a very good connection with the capital city of Serbia, (Belgrade) and the other cities like Smederevo and Aranđelovac. It has a population of around 5,000 people and it is very developed countryside. There are two schools in Kusadak for educating students till the 5th grade, and there is a bigger school in centre adecvate ll the way from 1st to 8th grade. There is also Pinosava, which dates from the 17th century and a great lake.

It has a lake which is surrounded by a big forest. Sport activities are present there too. It has one football team and a KUD (cultural-artistic society aka CAS) (Serbian: Kulturno umetnicko drustvo) which collects lot of young people in Kusadak.

== Čitluk necropolis ==
Čitluk is a hamlet of Kusadak. The locality is situated on the hillock, above the Čitluk water spring. It is located 3 km (1.9 mi) away from the center of Kusadak, on the left side of the old local way Kusadak-Glibovac-smederevska Palanka.

In 1983 a local farmer Radmilo Jakovljević found human skeletons while plowing his field. Archeologists, led by Ratko Katunar, conducted excavations in June 1983 and came upon a Mediaeval necropolis. They discovered 10 complete and 6 partial skeletons. The anthropological analysis by Slavica Krunić concluded that, of those complete skeletons, 4 were children's, 3 male, 2 female and 1 unidentified. The deceased were Christians and the burial date was estimated between the 11th and 13th century. Other discoveries in the surrounding area point to the existence of a Serbian-populated medieval settlement. After 35 years it was decided that, since all possible analysis were already conducted, the remains should be removed from the museum in Smederevska Palanka and reburied. It was a pioneering work in Serbia, as such findings usually remain in museum depots. After obtaining numerous special permits, both from the state and the church, the remains were reburied in the churchyard of the Pinosava Monastery in Kusadak on 9 March 2018. An appropriate ritual customs were conducted, including the burial a bit away from the existing graveyard and soaking of the remains in white wine. A commemorative gravestone will be erected later.
