= Smederevska Palanka =

Smederevska Palanka Смедеревска Паланка (Serbian)
- Town and municipality
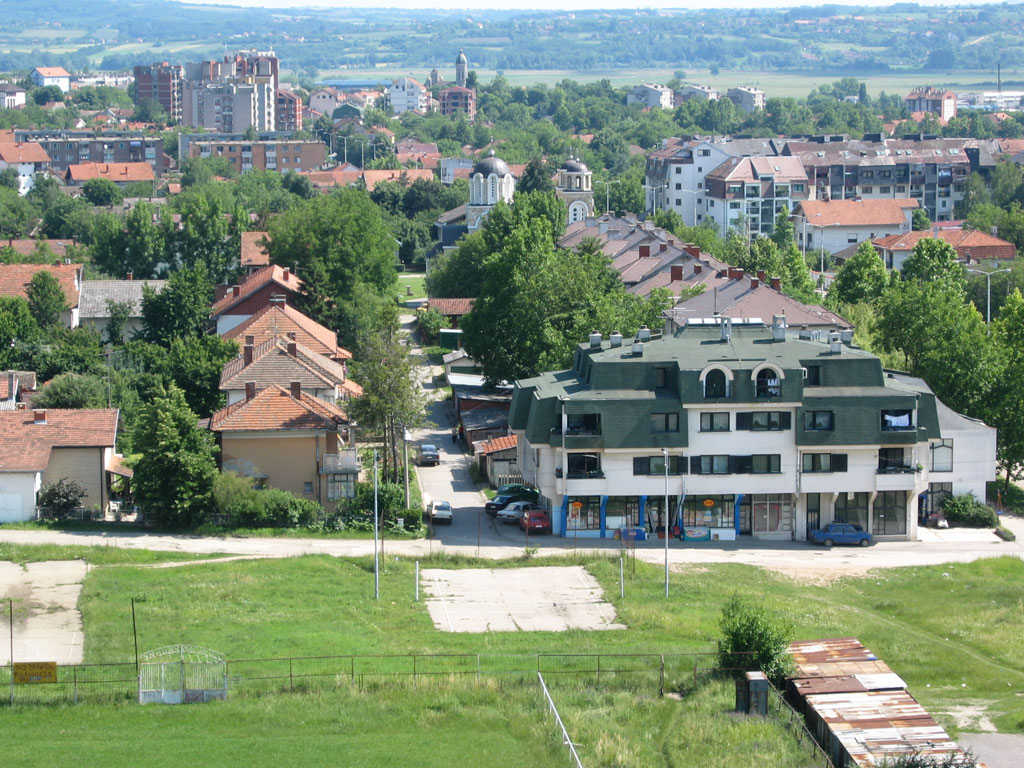

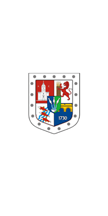
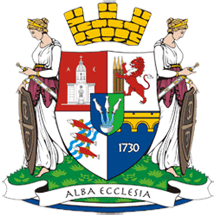
- Flag Coat of arms

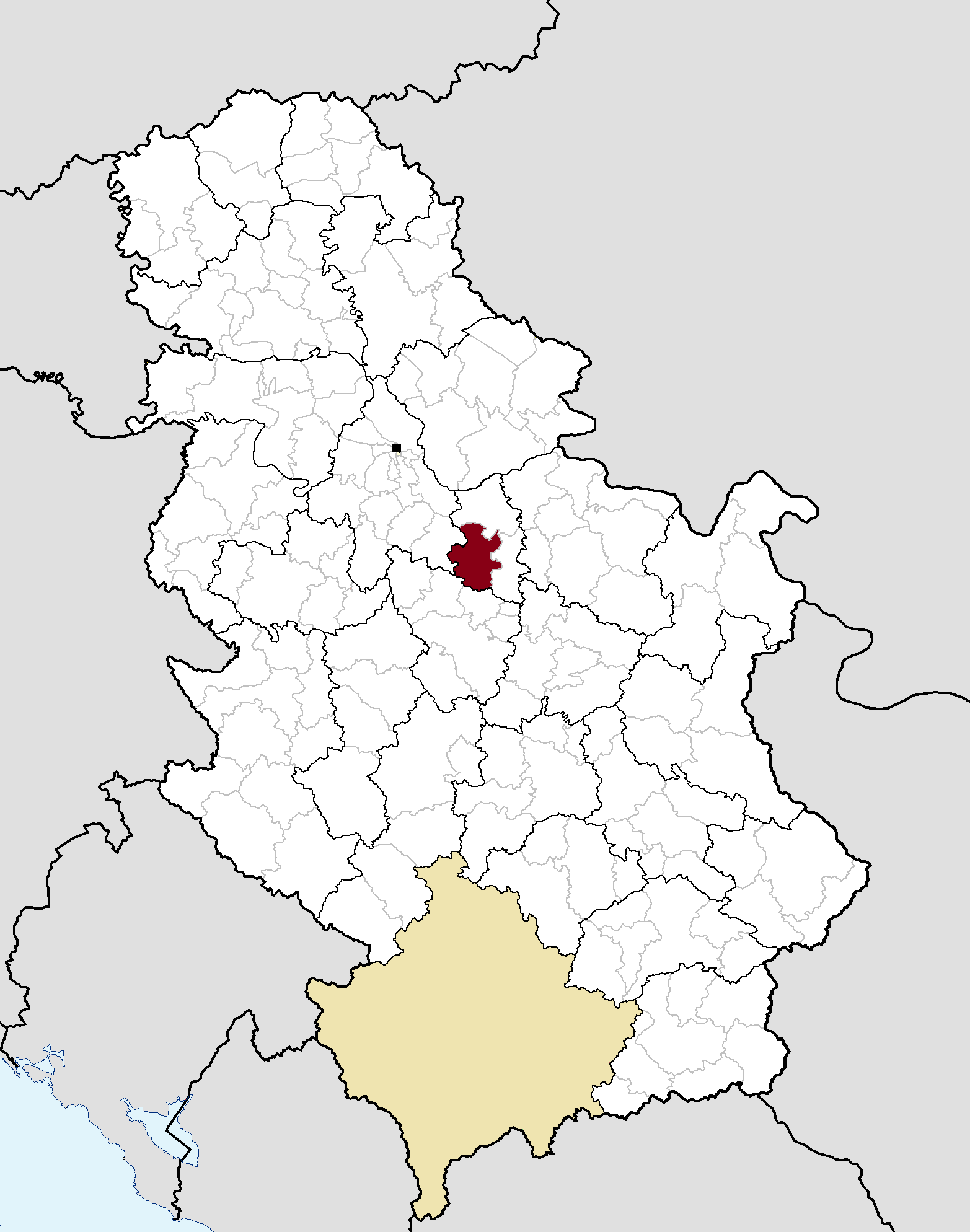
- Location of the municipality of Smederevska Palanka within Serbia
- Coordinates: 44°21.98′N 20°57.39′E
- Country: Serbia
- Region: Southern and Eastern Serbia
- District: Podunavlje
- Settlements: 18

Government
  - Mayor: Nikola Vučen (SNS)

Area
  - Town: 21.72 km^{2} (8.39 sq mi)
  - Municipality: 422 km^{2} (163 sq mi)
- Elevation: 125 m (410 ft)

Population (2022 census)
  - Town: 20,345
  - Town density: 936.7/km^{2} (2,426/sq mi)
  - Municipality: 42,192
  - Municipality density: 100/km^{2} (259/sq mi)
- Time zone: UTC+1 (CET)
  - Summer (DST): UTC+2 (CEST)
- Postal code: 11420
- Area code: +381(0)26
- Car plates: SP
- Website: www.smederevskapalanka.rs

Smederevska Palanka (Serbian Cyrillic: Смедеревска Паланка, pronounced [smɛ̂dɛrɛʋska pǎlaːŋka]) is a town and municipality located in the Podunavlje District and the geographical region of Šumadija. According to the 2022 census, the town has 20,345 while the municipality has 42,192 inhabitants.

== History ==
In the vicinity of the town there are two archaeological sites: Medvednjak, near Grčac, and Staro Selo, near Selevac. They belong to the end of Neolithic and early Eneolithic, or the period 4500-3500 BC, during the developed and ending phase of the Vinča culture when the first evidence of metallurgy appeared. The culture then disappears as the population presumably migrated. Both settlements were large, spreading on 40 to 60 ha (99 to 148 acres). Findings from the later Hallstatt culture were also discovered. The most important artefacts, kept in the People's Museum in Smederevska Palanka, are the anthropomorphic figurines of high artistic and artisan value. One of the most valuable and considered unique is the one called "Woman in labor", due to its contracted position. In total, there are over 1,000 figurines, some complete, some damaged, but it is estimated that at least 3,000 of them are in personal collections.

There are also numerous finds from both Roman and Medieval periods. The most unusual of these finds is the cameo in two-layered onyx of Emperor Constantine I in full battle gear on a horse which was discovered near Kusadak, a village in the Smederevka Palanka municipality.

The town was first mentioned in 1021, in a written document currently preserved in St. Catherine's monastery in Egypt.

On 20 August 1941, 16 Yugoslav Partisans were executed by the Axis occupation forces.

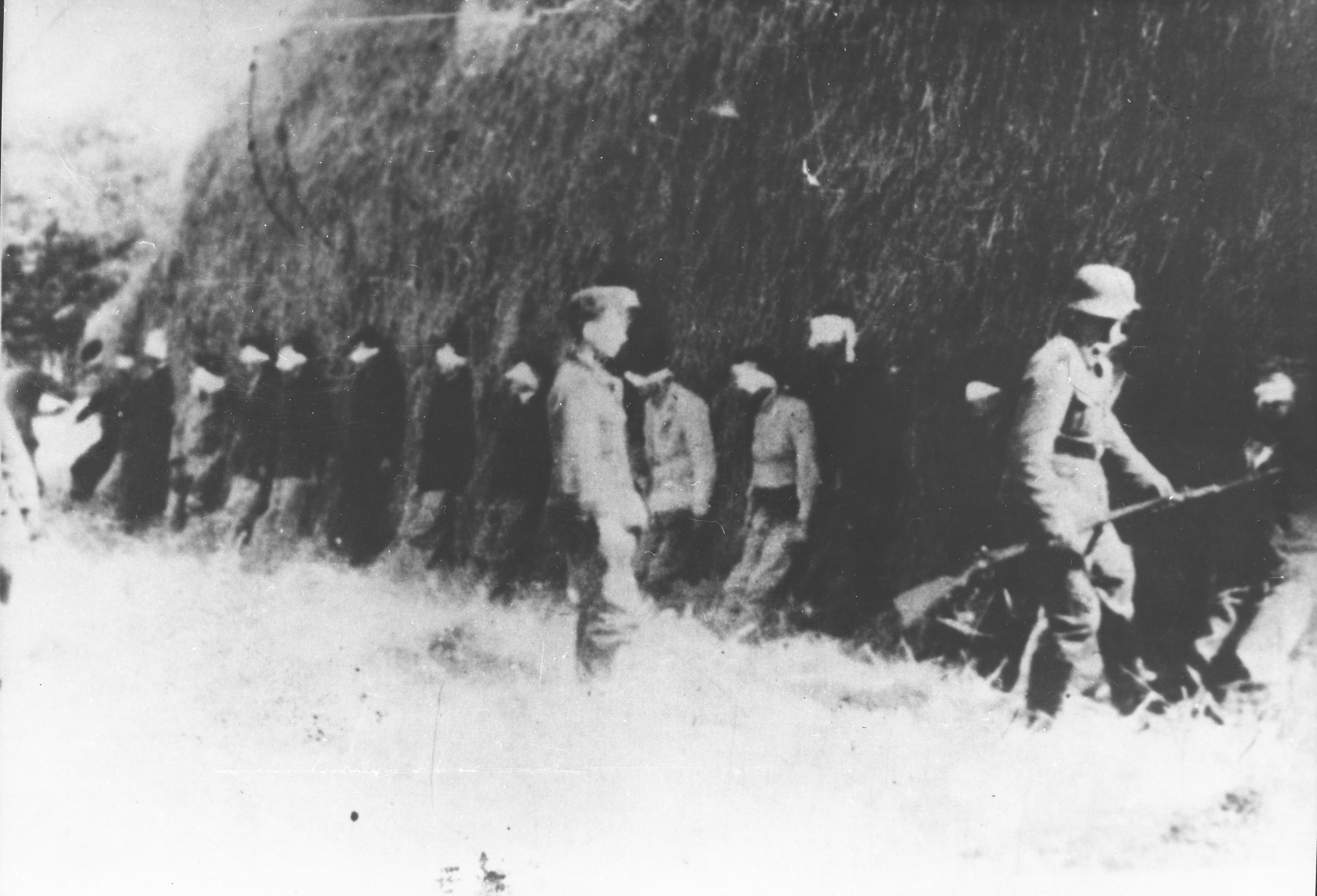
16 blindfolded Yugoslav partisans awaiting their execution

== Climate ==
Smederevska Palanka has a humid subtropical climate (Köppen climate classification: Cfa). Smederevska Palanka holds the Serbian national record for the highest temperature ever recorded with 44.9 °C (112.8 °F), on 24 July 2007.

Climate data for Smederevska Palanka (1991–2020, extremes 1961–present)
Month	Jan	Feb	Mar	Apr	May	Jun	Jul	Aug	Sep	Oct	Nov	Dec	Year
Record high °C (°F)	21.8 (71.2)	24.9 (76.8)	28.3 (82.9)	32.5 (90.5)	35.6 (96.1)	39.7 (103.5)	44.9 (112.8)	41.7 (107.1)	37.7 (99.9)	34.5 (94.1)	28.0 (82.4)	21.6 (70.9)	44.9 (112.8)
Mean daily maximum °C (°F)	5.3 (41.5)	8.0 (46.4)	13.3 (55.9)	18.8 (65.8)	23.5 (74.3)	27.2 (81.0)	29.5 (85.1)	29.8 (85.6)	24.5 (76.1)	18.7 (65.7)	12.4 (54.3)	6.1 (43.0)	18.1 (64.6)
Daily mean °C (°F)	1.0 (33.8)	2.9 (37.2)	7.1 (44.8)	12.3 (54.1)	17.1 (62.8)	20.9 (69.6)	22.7 (72.9)	22.4 (72.3)	17.3 (63.1)	12.0 (53.6)	7.2 (45.0)	2.2 (36.0)	12.1 (53.8)
Mean daily minimum °C (°F)	−2.6 (27.3)	−1.5 (29.3)	1.7 (35.1)	6.0 (42.8)	10.5 (50.9)	14.3 (57.7)	15.6 (60.1)	15.3 (59.5)	11.2 (52.2)	6.8 (44.2)	3.1 (37.6)	−1.2 (29.8)	6.6 (43.9)
Record low °C (°F)	−29.9 (−21.8)	−28.4 (−19.1)	−20.7 (−5.3)	−7.8 (18.0)	−0.8 (30.6)	1.5 (34.7)	6.5 (43.7)	5.1 (41.2)	−3.3 (26.1)	−7.3 (18.9)	−16.5 (2.3)	−23.6 (−10.5)	−29.9 (−21.8)
Average precipitation mm (inches)	44.0 (1.73)	42.7 (1.68)	45.5 (1.79)	51.7 (2.04)	70.2 (2.76)	76.7 (3.02)	68.1 (2.68)	56.6 (2.23)	58.7 (2.31)	57.3 (2.26)	44.5 (1.75)	53.5 (2.11)	669.5 (26.36)
Average precipitation days (≥ 0.1 mm)	13.9	12.6	12.0	12.7	13.3	12.0	9.9	7.9	9.5	10.7	11.0	15.2	140.7
Average snowy days	9.3	7.7	4.2	0.7	0.0	0.0	0.0	0.0	0.0	0.2	2.7	7.4	32.2
Average relative humidity (%)	80.9	75.5	67.8	65.9	68.0	68.4	65.1	65.7	71.0	76.3	78.1	82.4	72.1
Mean monthly sunshine hours	83.1	111.0	162.7	199.0	240.4	272.2	304.6	286.6	206.8	165.6	108.2	73.2	2,213.4
Source: Republic Hydrometeorological Service of Serbia

== Settlements ==
Apart from the town, the municipality of Smederevska Palanka includes the following settlements:

- Azanja (3946)
- Bačinac (688)
- Baničina (941)
- Bašin (442)
- Cerovac (1054)
- Glibovac (2096)
- Golobok (1988)
- Grčac (1094)
- Kusadak (4865)
- Mala Plana (803)
- Mramorac (553)
- Pridvorice (787)
- Ratari (1766)
- Selevac (3381)
- Stojačak (364)
- Vlaški Do (971)
- Vodice (881)

== Demographics ==
Historical population
Year	Pop.	±% p.a.
1948	50,306	—
1953	53,039	+1.06%
1961	55,488	+0.57%
1971	58,112	+0.46%
1981	60,945	+0.48%
1991	59,822	−0.19%
2002	56,011	−0.60%
2011	50,284	−1.19%
2022	42,192	−1.58%

As of 2011 census, the municipality had 50,284 inhabitants.

=== Ethnic groups ===
The ethnic composition of the municipality:

Ethnic group	Population	%
Serbs	47,972	95.40%
Roma	563	1.12%
Macedonians	115	0.23%
Montenegrins	81	0.16%
Croats	63	0.13%
Yugoslavs	43	0.09%
Hungarians	22	0.04%
Albanians	16	0.03%
Others	1,425	2.83%
Total	50,284	

== Society and culture ==
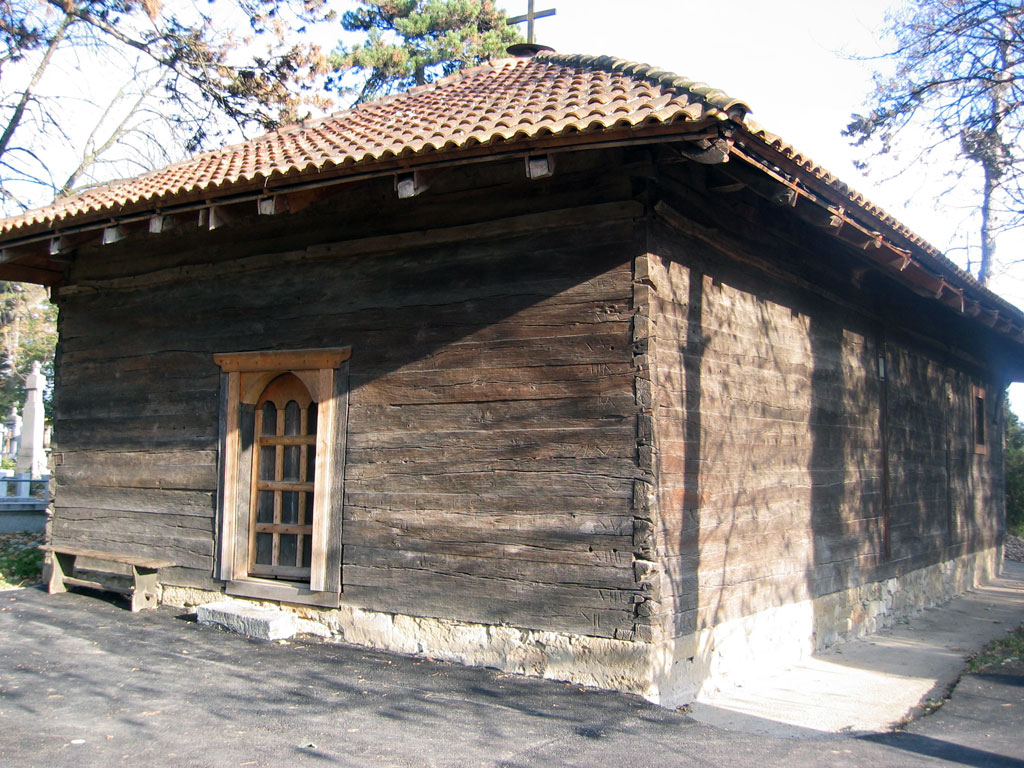
Church of Saint Elijah

=== Culture ===
There are currently three Serbian Orthodox churches in Smederevska Palanka.

The oldest, the church of St. Elijah was built in 1827 and is one of the oldest wooden churches in Serbia. The town's Cathedral Church was built in 1902. The town's newest church, St. Petka, was built in 1997. The town's fourth Serbian orthodox church is under construction. Koporin Monastery, built in 1402 by Serbian prince Stefan Lazarević, lies just outside the town in Velika Plana. Historical Archive "Veroslava Veljašević" of Smederevska Palanka was established on December 30, 1968.

=== Education ===
Smederevska Palanka has four elementary schools: Vuk Karadžić, Heroj Radmila Šišković, Heroj Ivan Muker and Olga Milošević. The town has three high schools: Palanka Gymnasium, Goša Technical School, and "Žikica Damnjanović" Chemical and Medical School.

Smederevska Palanka has one local operating television station "Jasenica" and one newspaper "Palanačke" by journalist and writer Dejan Crnomarković.

=== Sports ===
Local football club FK Jasenica 2017 plays in the 4th tier of the Serbian football pyramid.

=== Events ===
Annually every June, the town hosts the Best Fest Palanka, a rock festival featuring famous Serbian bands including Bajaga, Riblja čorba, Marčelo, Six Pack, Sunshine rap group and others.

Smederevska Palanka has one of Serbia's oldest annual traditional fairs, the Krstovdanski Vašar which has been held since 1834 when it was introduced by Prince Miloš Obrenović. During the fair, the town is visited by 100,000 to 150,000 tourists from surrounding towns and cities.

Smederevska Palanka hosts the "Motorijada", where thousands of bikers from Serbia and the former Yugoslavia assemble for the event and live concerts in Smederevska Palanka's Kiseljak. The 2011 event featured a famous Yugoslav band, Divlje Jagode.

=== Tourism ===
Beside archaeological findings and medieval monasteries, famous touristic spots in Smederevska Palanka include lake Kudreč, the Kiseljak spa complex and Mikulja forest.

Smederevska Palanka has a natural mineral water spring which is said to have been used since Roman times and has been used by the surrounding peoples since at least 1719. On 22 April 1907, the water from the mineral springs was awarded the golden medal for quality at the London 'Balkan Fair'.

According to some researchers, the town's mineral water is the 3rd best in Europe, primarily due to the natural selenium it contains.

== Economy ==
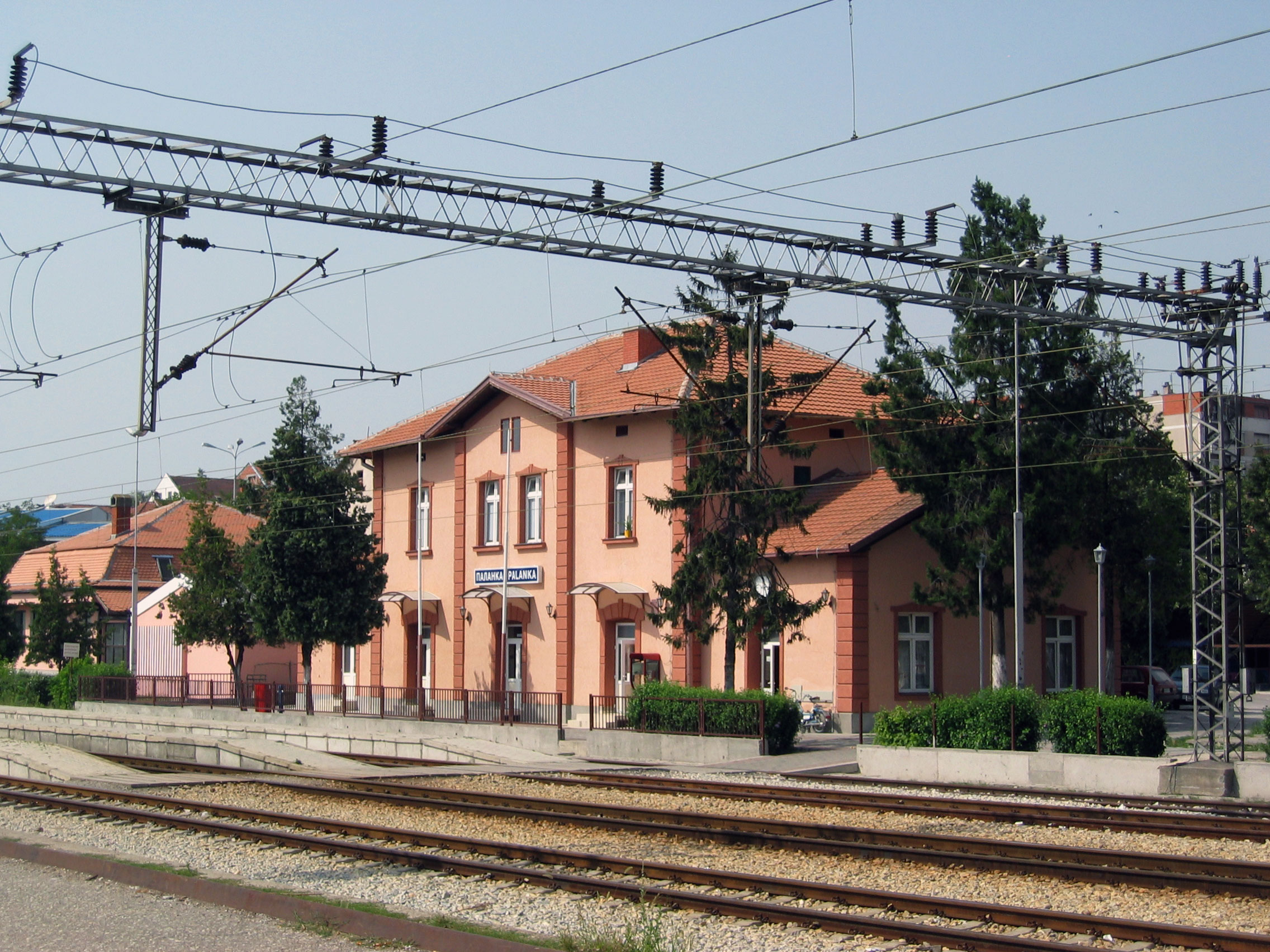
Smederevska Palanka railway station, built in 1884.

Smederevska Palanka is an important industrial town, primarily due to the influence of manufacturing company Goša FOM which was among the biggest companies in the former Yugoslavia. The company produces trams, train wagons as well as prefabricated steel constructions.

Other industries and businesses based in Smederevska Palanka include "Karađorđe", a company which produces mineral water and juice, "Voćar Palanka" a food manufacturer and fruit supplier as well as "Opeka Palanka", bricks and building material manufacturer.

Additionally, Smederevska Palanka operates an Institute of Agriculture which researches seeds and vegetables.

The following table gives a preview of total number of registered people employed in legal entities per their core activity (as of 2018):

Activity	Total
Agriculture, forestry and fishing	163
Mining and quarrying	-
Manufacturing	2,265
Electricity, gas, steam and air conditioning supply	52
Water supply; sewerage, waste management and remediation activities	175
Construction	481
Wholesale and retail trade, repair of motor vehicles and motorcycles	1,385
Transportation and storage	327
Accommodation and food services	196
Information and communication	78
Financial and insurance activities	94
Real estate activities	32
Professional, scientific and technical activities	324
Administrative and support service activities	141
Public administration and defense; compulsory social security	445
Education	682
Human health and social work activities	1,139
Arts, entertainment and recreation	137
Other service activities	177
Individual agricultural workers	989
Total	9,282

== Transportation ==
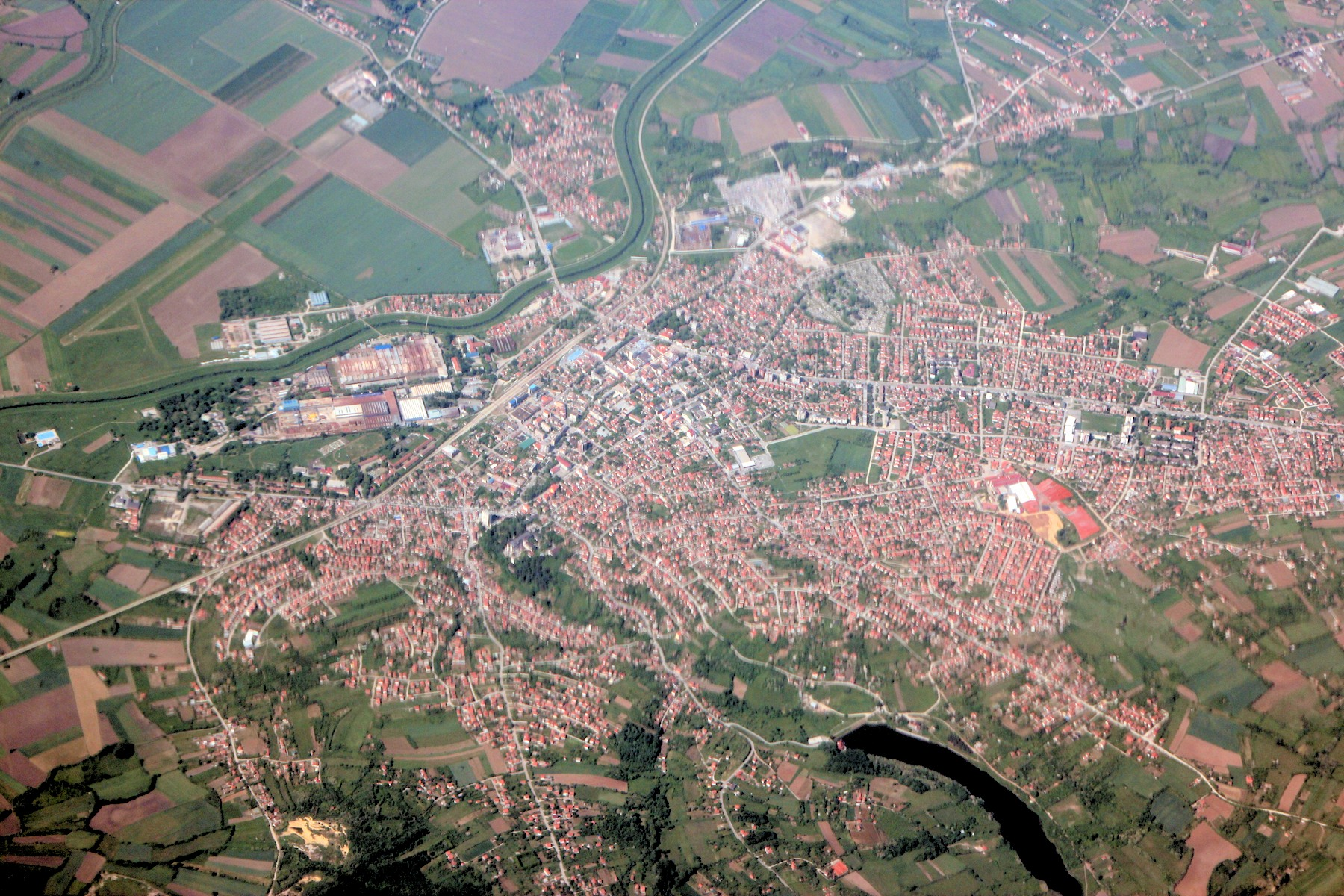
Aerial view

Smederevska Palanka lies on A1 motorway, which is part of Pan-European Corridor X. It is also at the route of the Belgrade-Niš railway. The town's railway station was built in 1884.

== Gallery ==
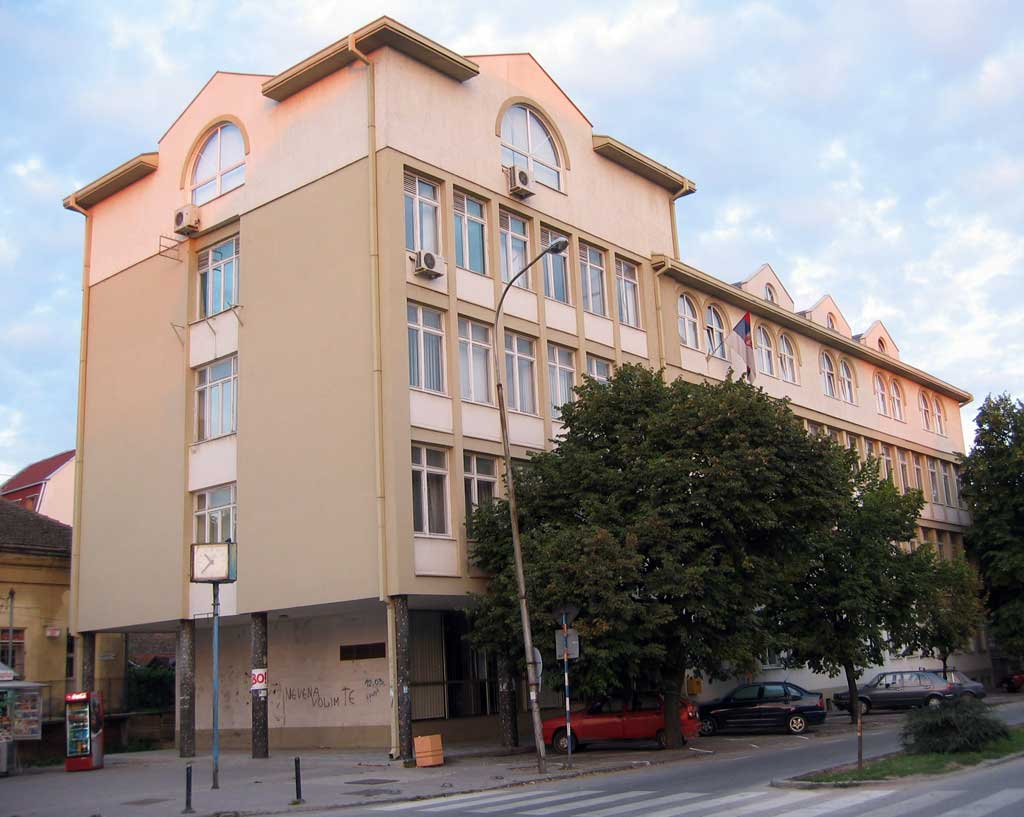

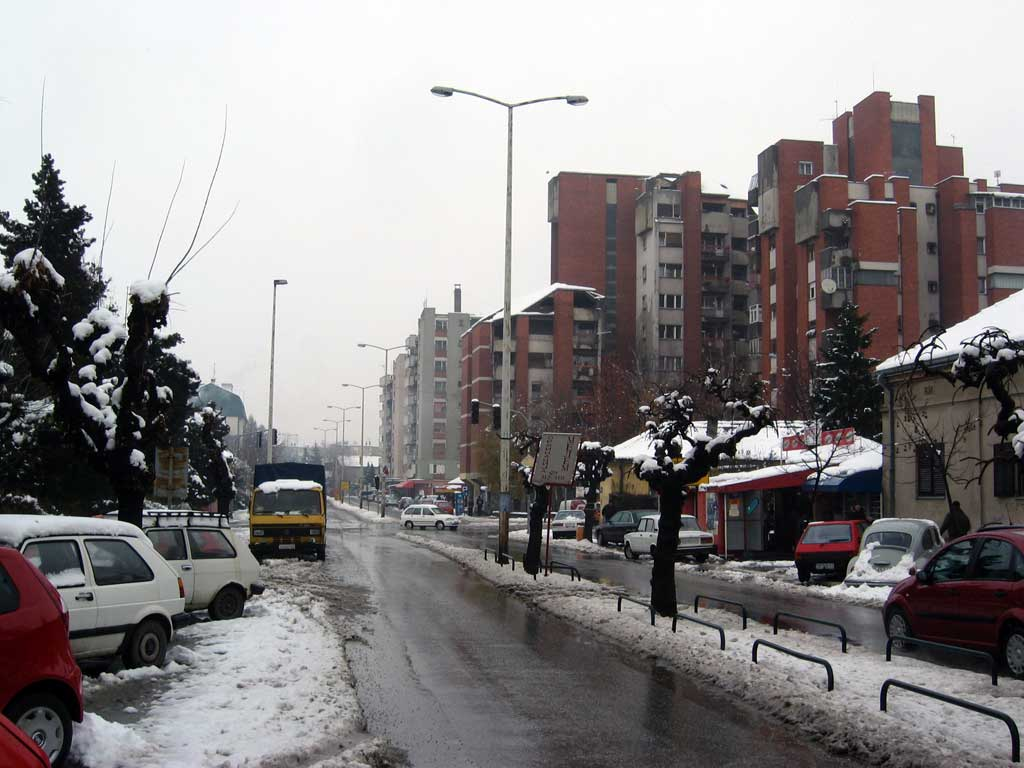

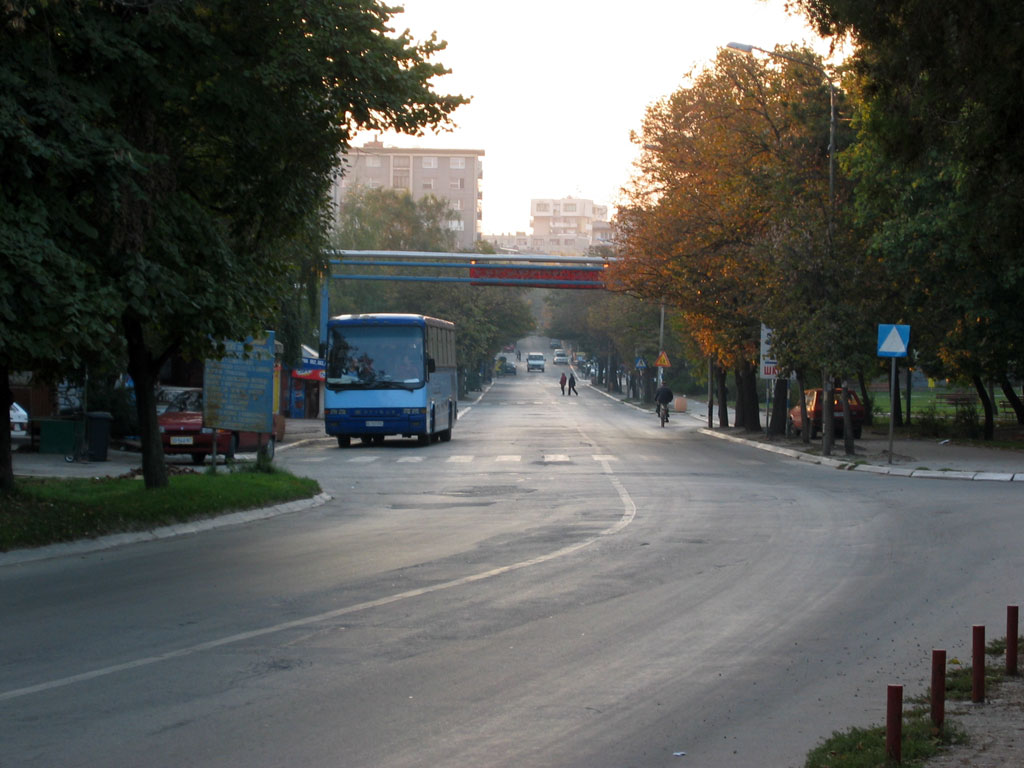

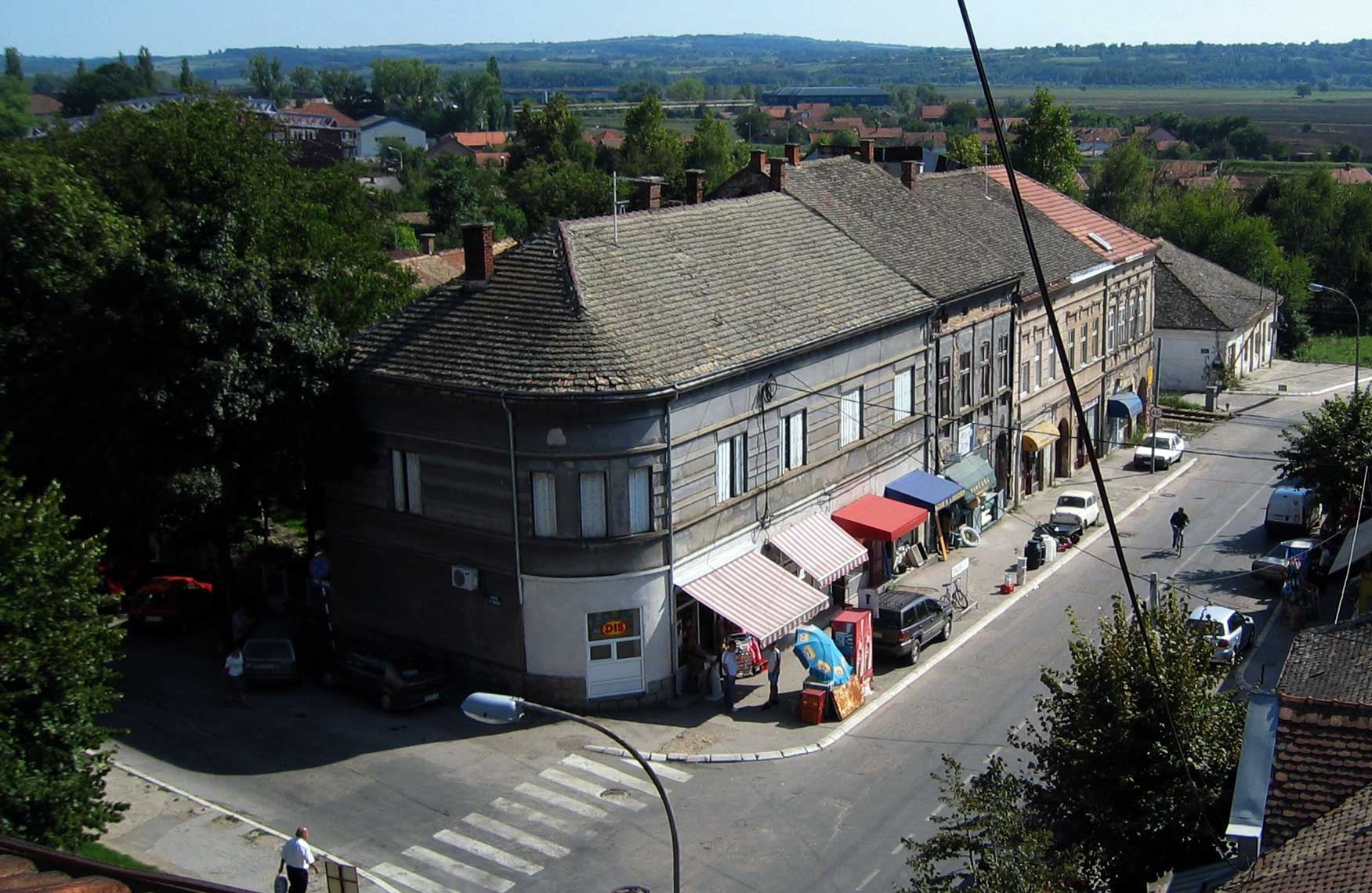

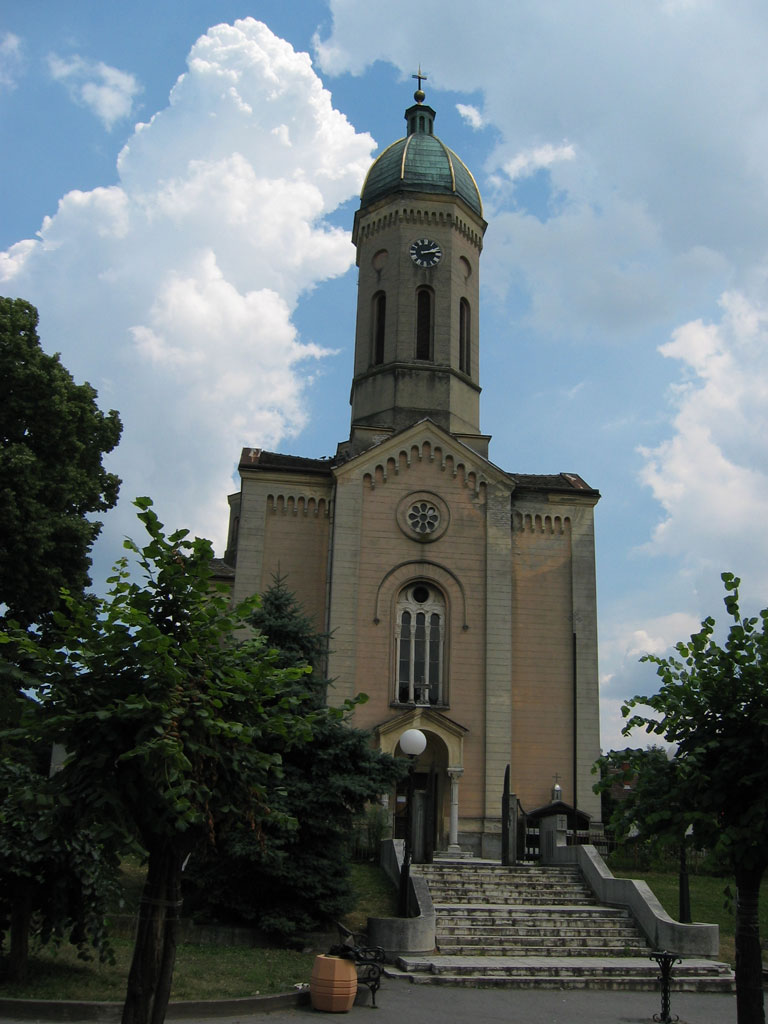

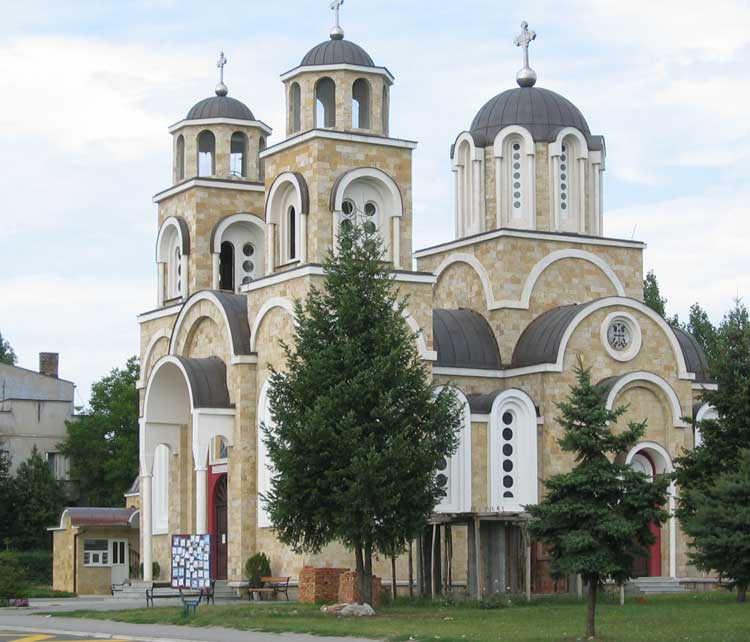

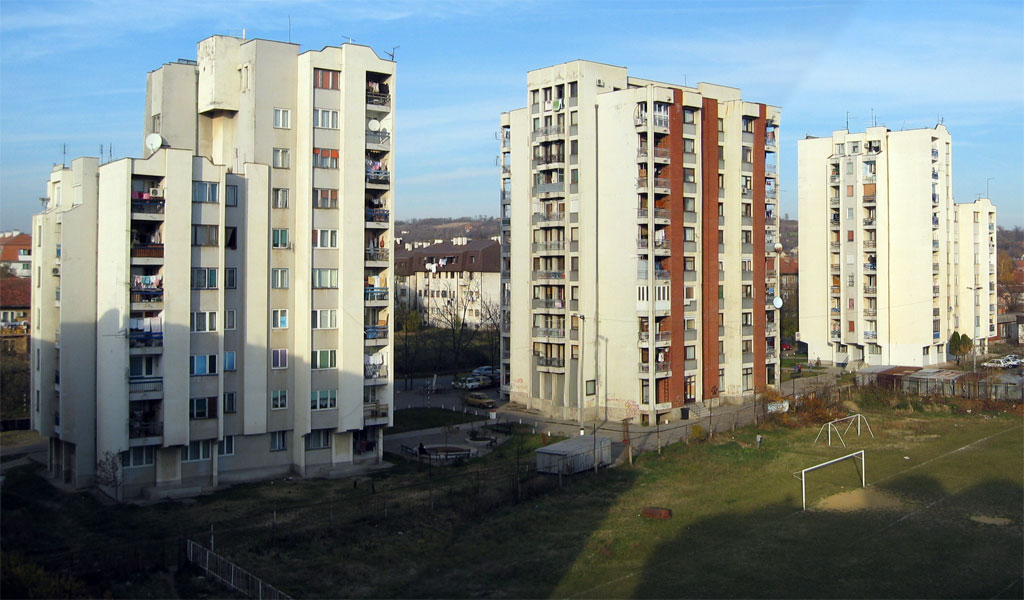

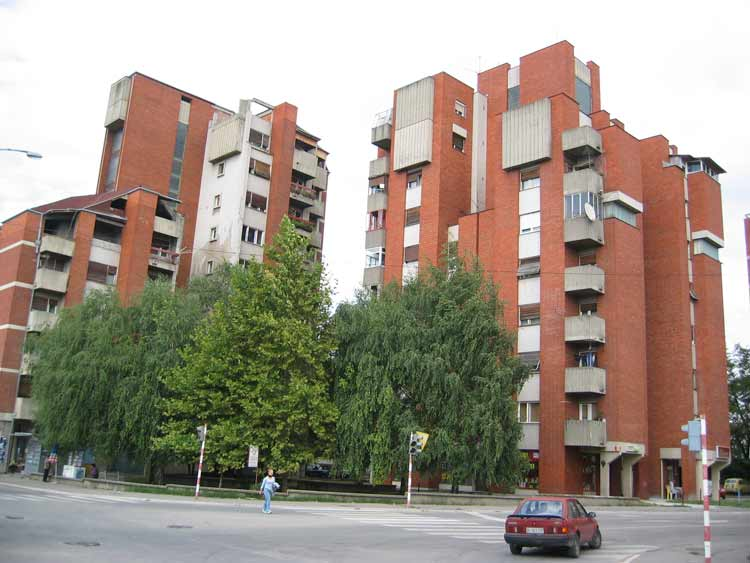

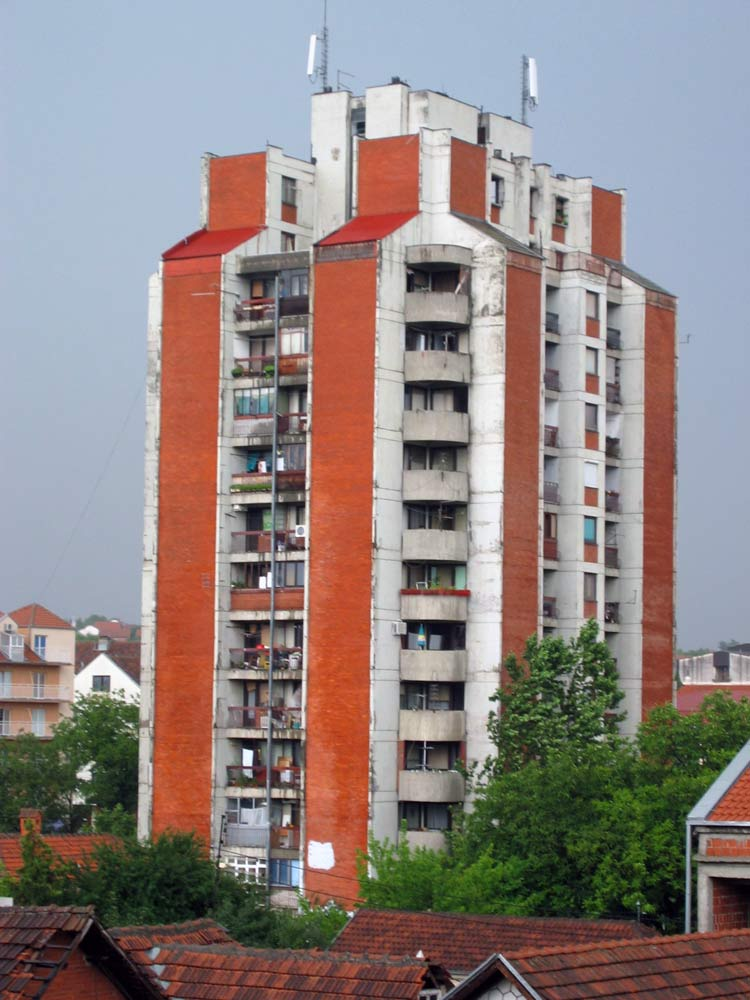

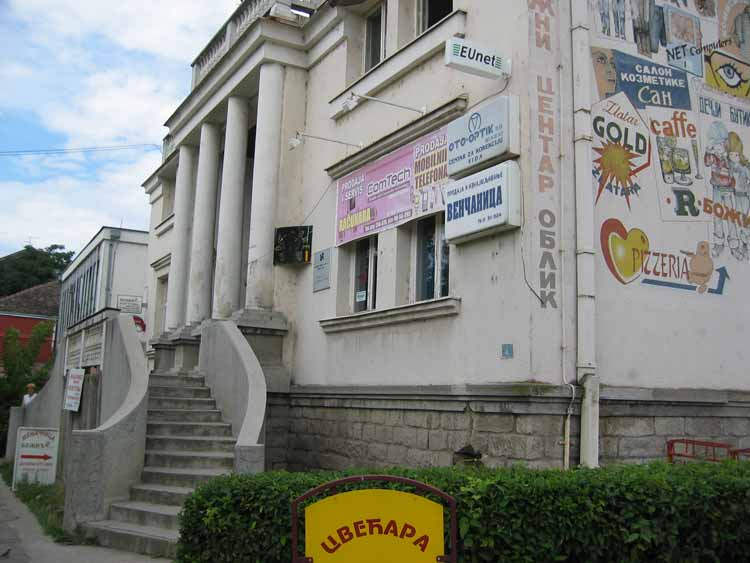

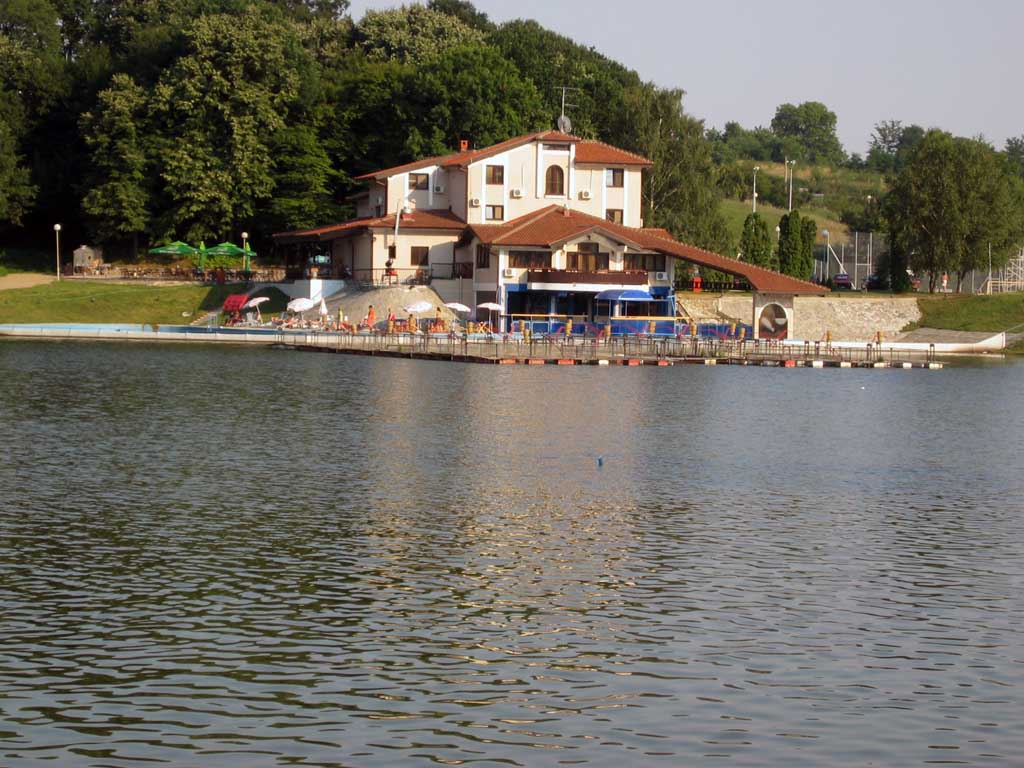

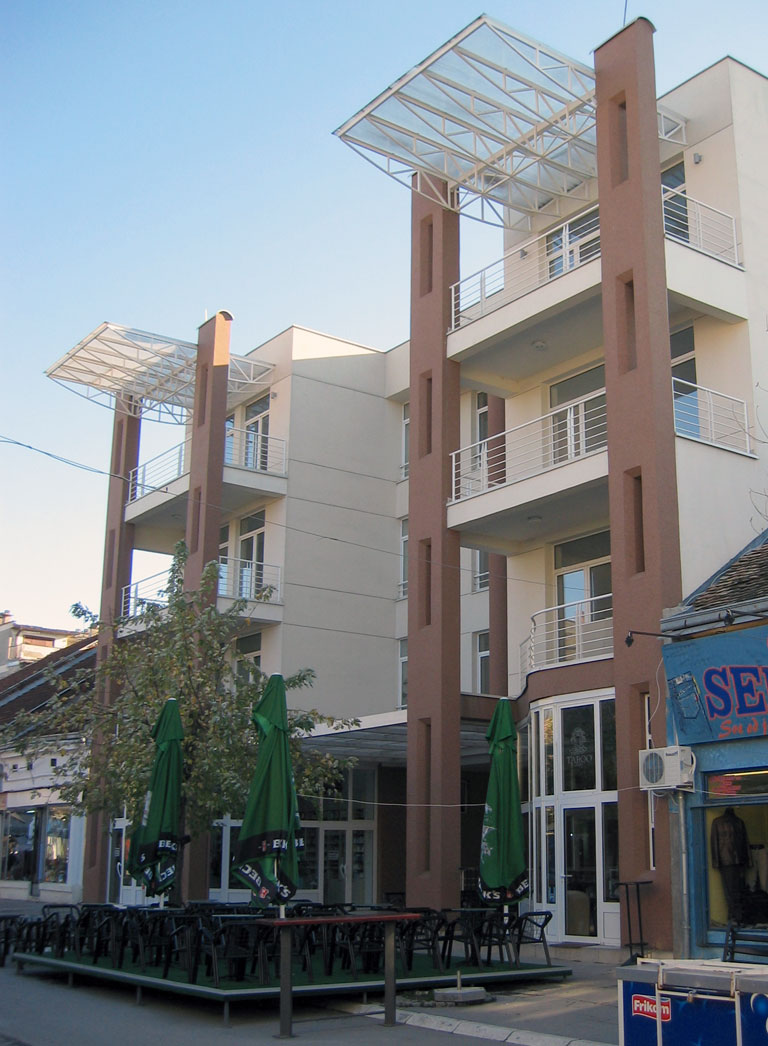

== Notable people ==
Some of the notable people of Smederevska Palanka are:

- Stanoje Glavaš, First Serbian Uprising hero
- Miloje Popović Đak
- Dejan Crnomarković, writer, poet
- Josip Broz Tito, statesman, lived in Smederevska Palanka and was employed as a metalworker here
- Vladimir Rakićević, researcher
- Živko Pavlović, general
- Perica Ognjenović, a football player
- Viborg Koceić, a football player
- Miroslav Muta Nikolić, basketball player
- Nino Rešić, singer
- Zdenko Muf, a football player
- Radmila Milentijević, former minister
- Milutin Srećković, professor and writer
- Pera Todorović, journalist
- Aranđel Markićević Minister of Justice 1994-1998
- Mina Milutinović, Miss World Next Top Model 2012
- Ivan Načković, Russian born, lives in Smederevska Palanka, musician
- Zoran Todorović Todor, academic painter and professor

== International cooperation ==
Smederevska Palanka is twinned with Škofja Loka in Slovenia. Before the Yugoslav wars, the two towns had a joint art colony Groharjeva kolonija.

After the first World War, one street in the center of Smederevska Palanka was named Francuska, or French street while a street in the French city of Grenoble was named after Palanka as a way of celebrating the friendship between Serbia and France.

== Twin towns ==
Smederevska Palanka is twinned with:

- Brčko, Bosnia and Herzegovina
- Škofja Loka, Slovenia

== See also ==
- Municipalities of Serbia
- Cities and towns in Serbia
- Populated places of Serbia
- Smederevska Palanka Airport
