= Podunavlje District =

Administrative district of Serbia

Podunavlje District Подунавски округ
- Administrative district of Serbia
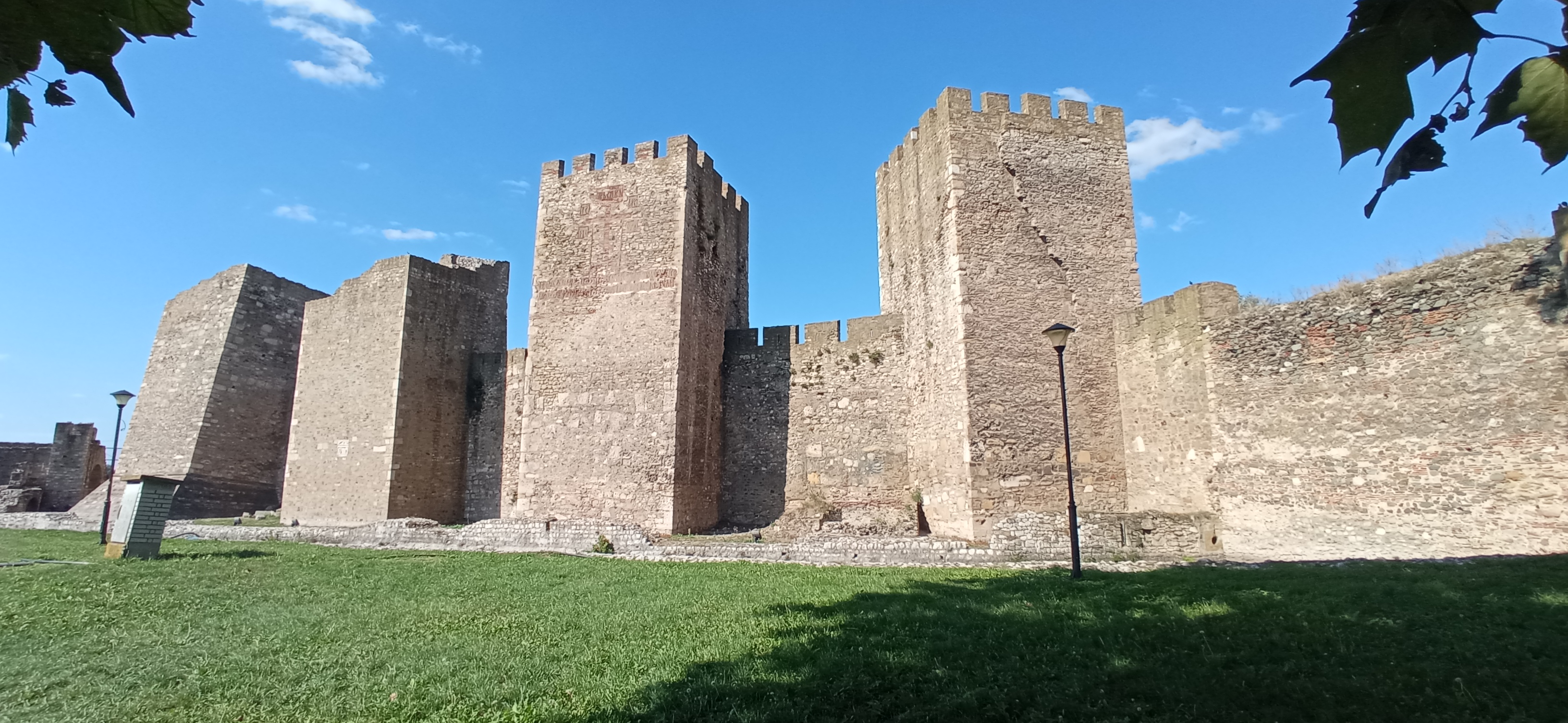
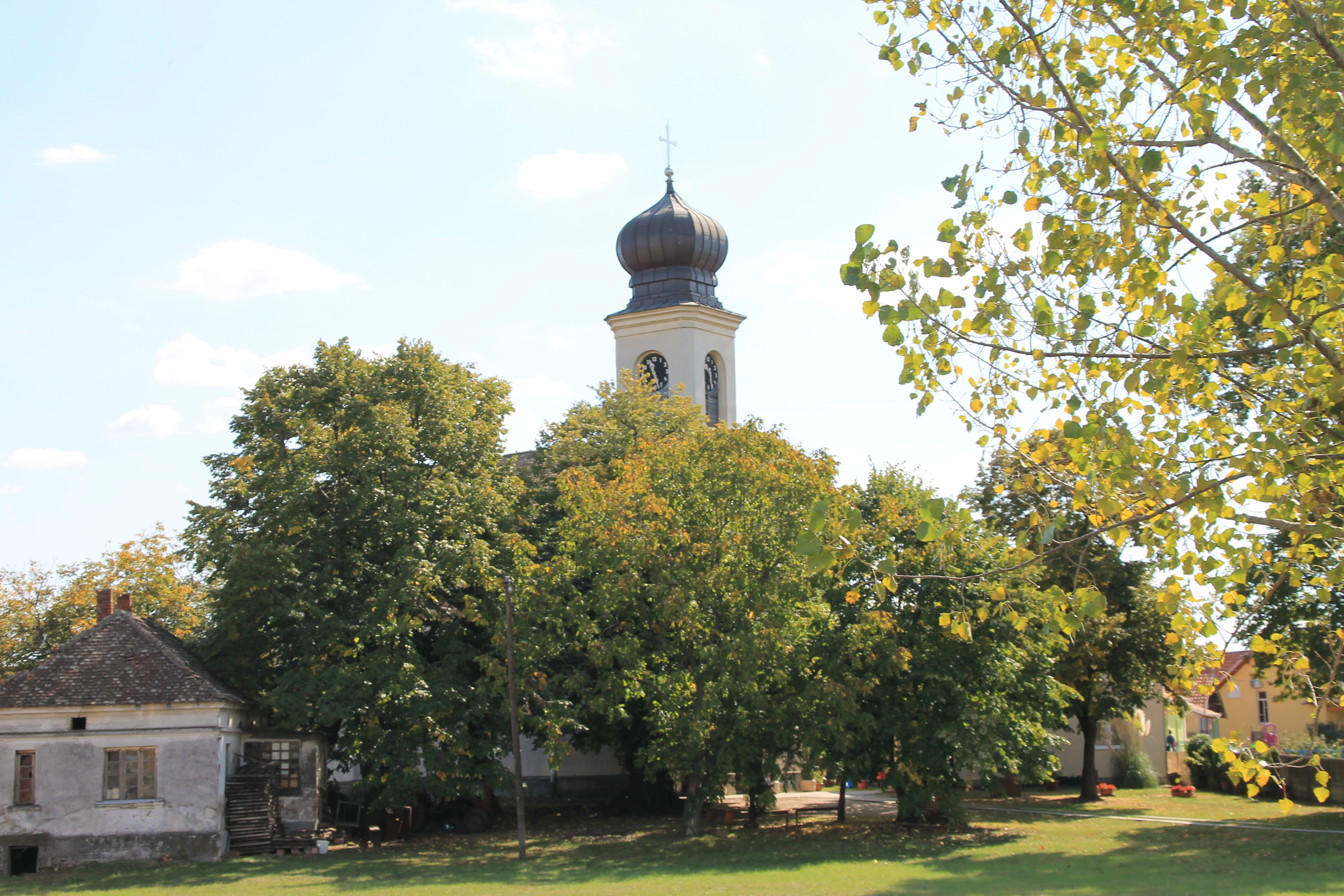
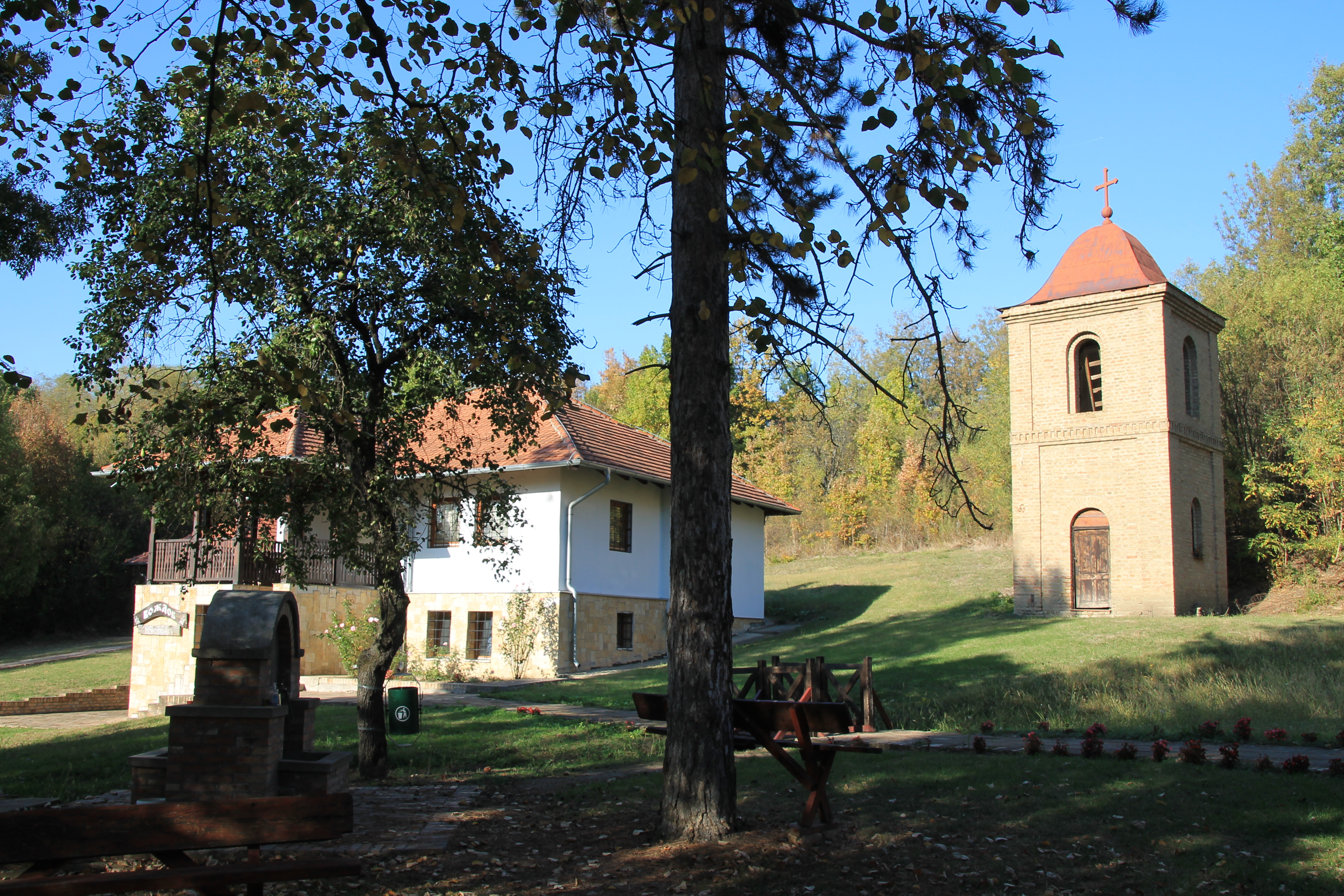
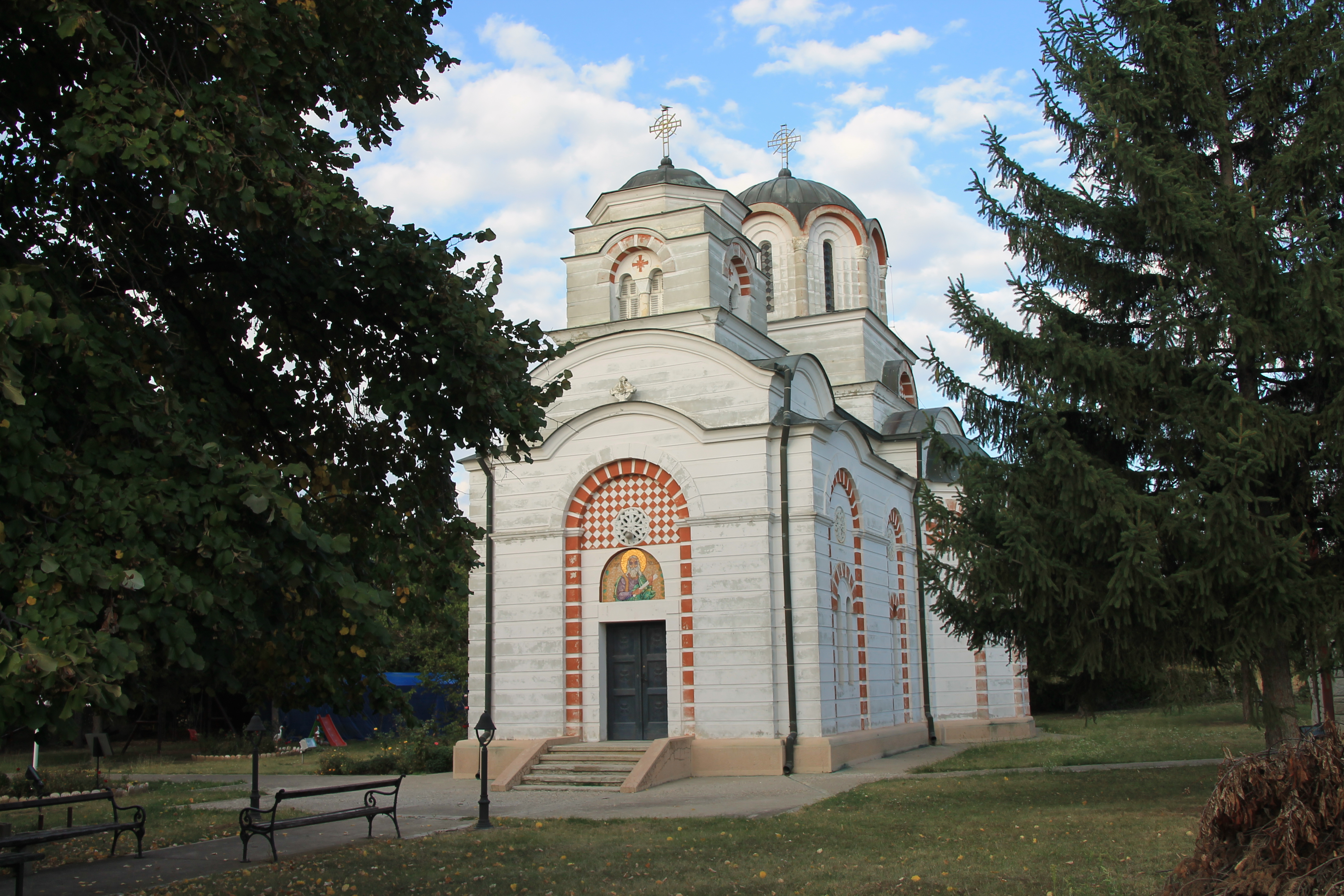
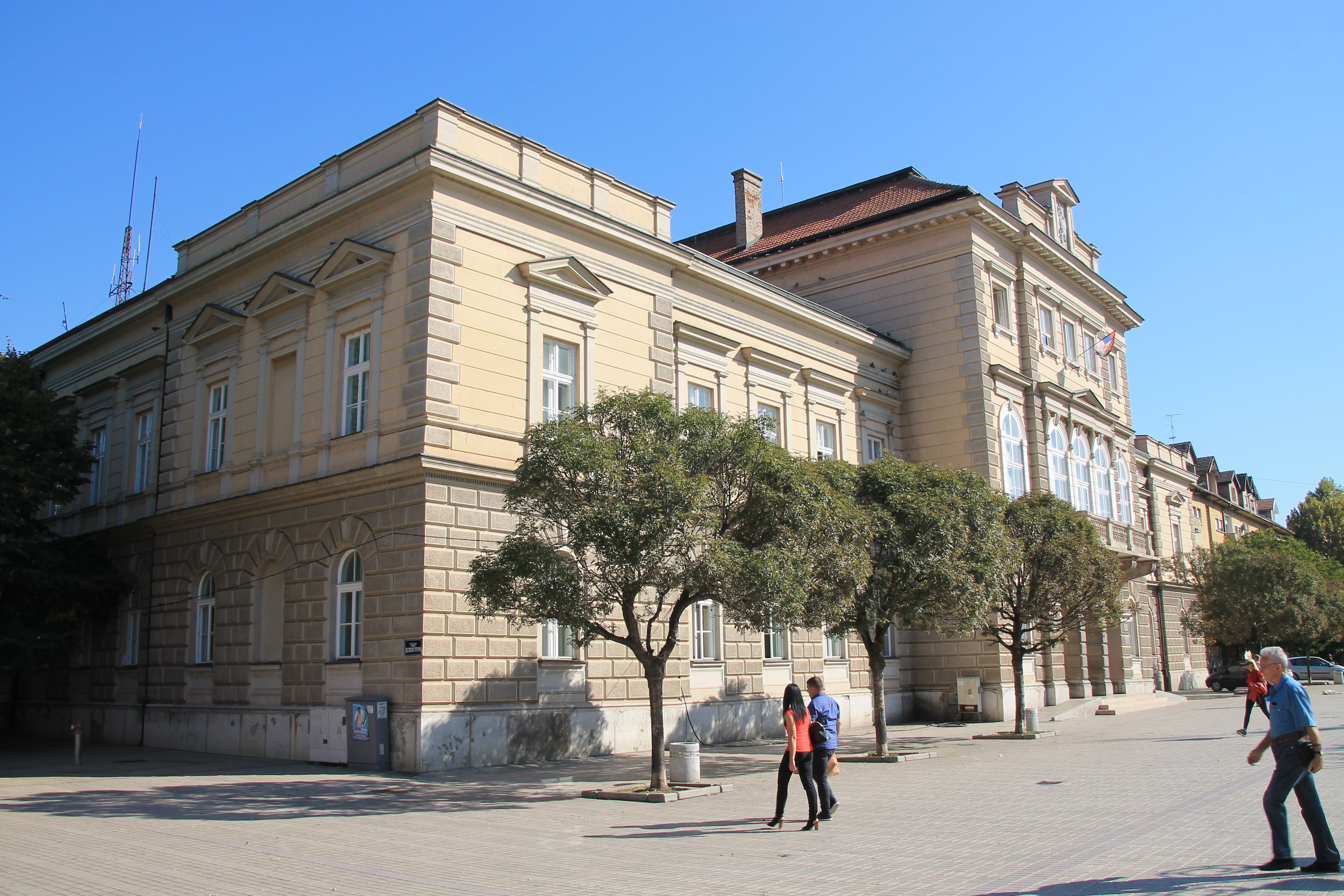
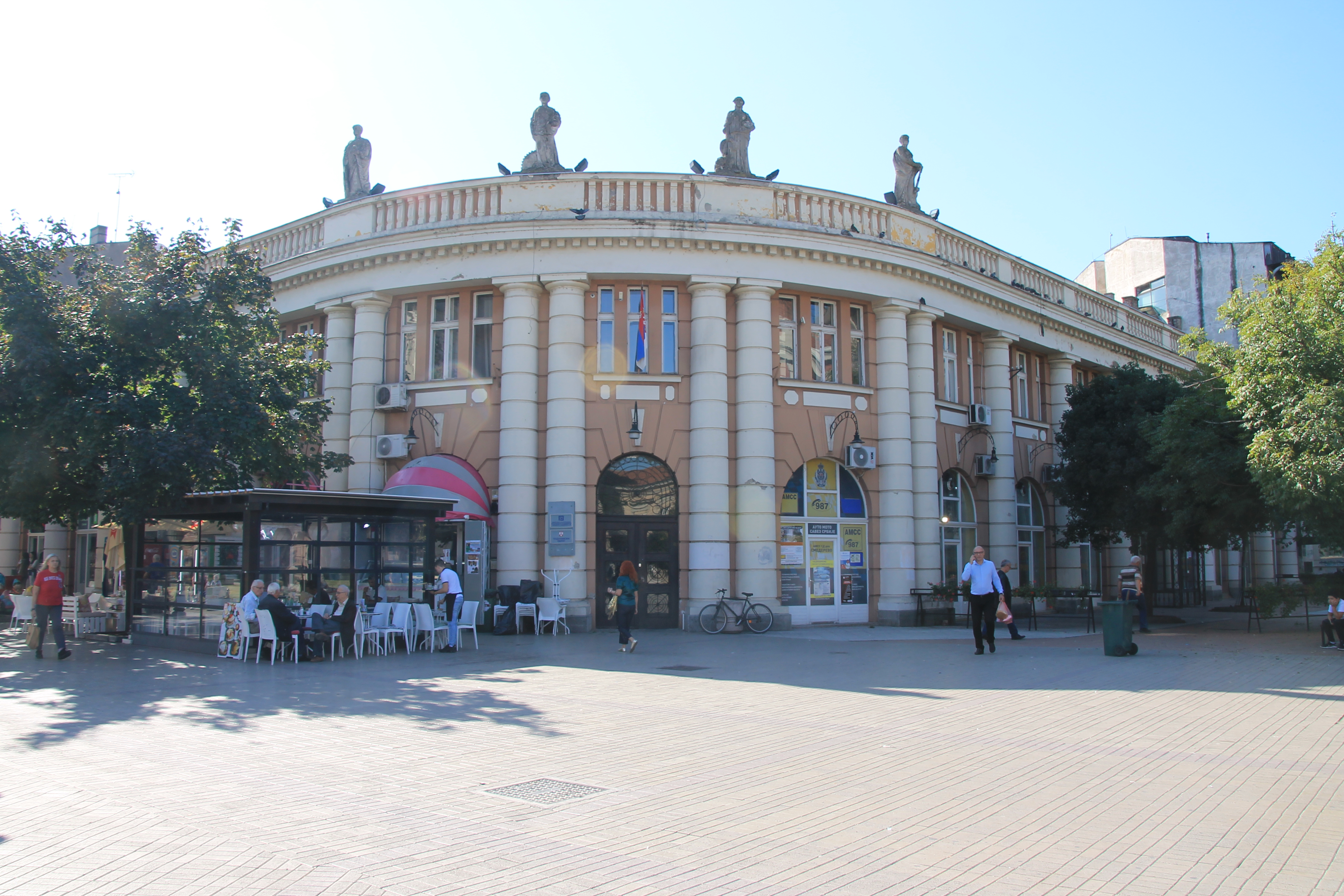
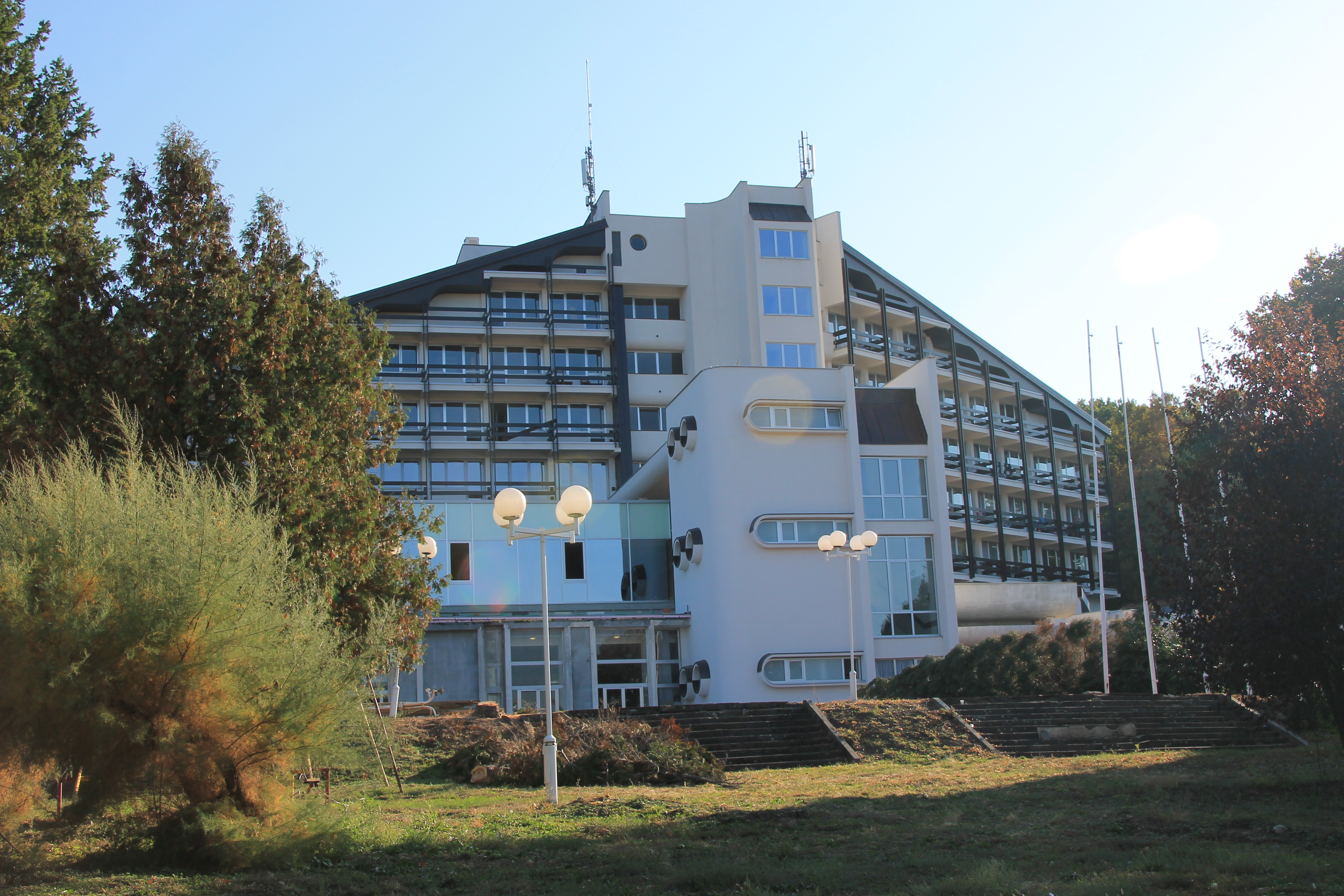
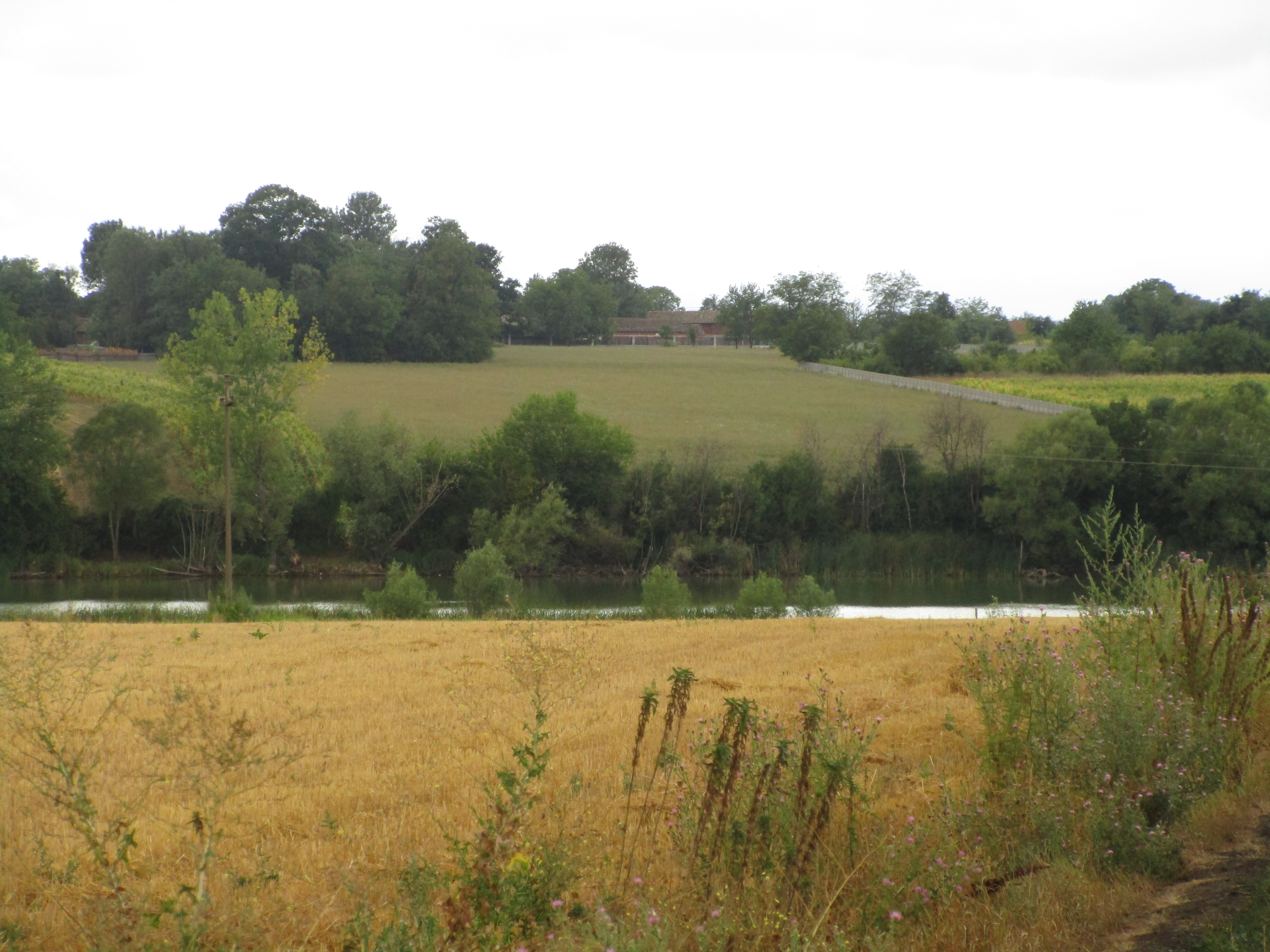
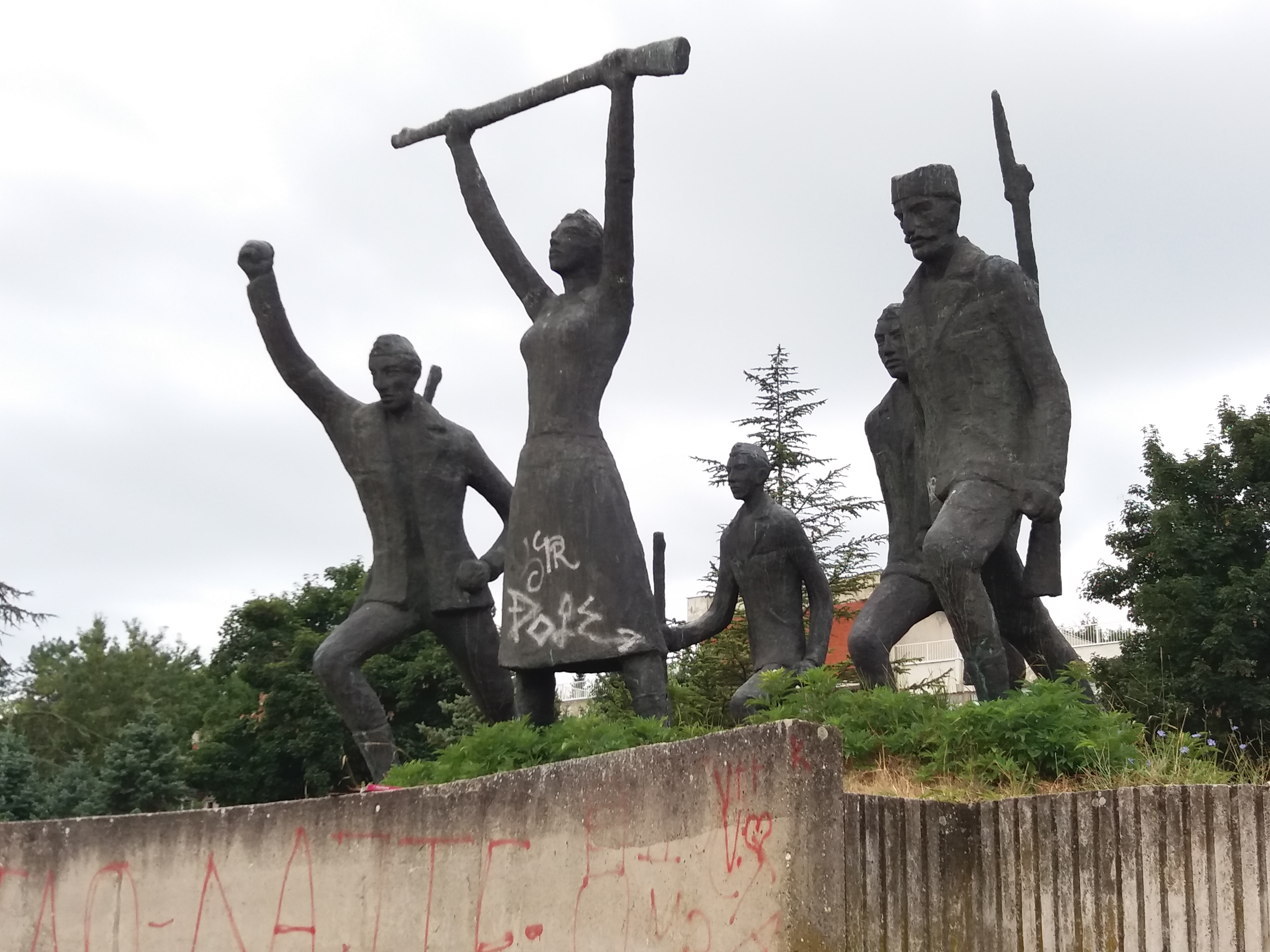
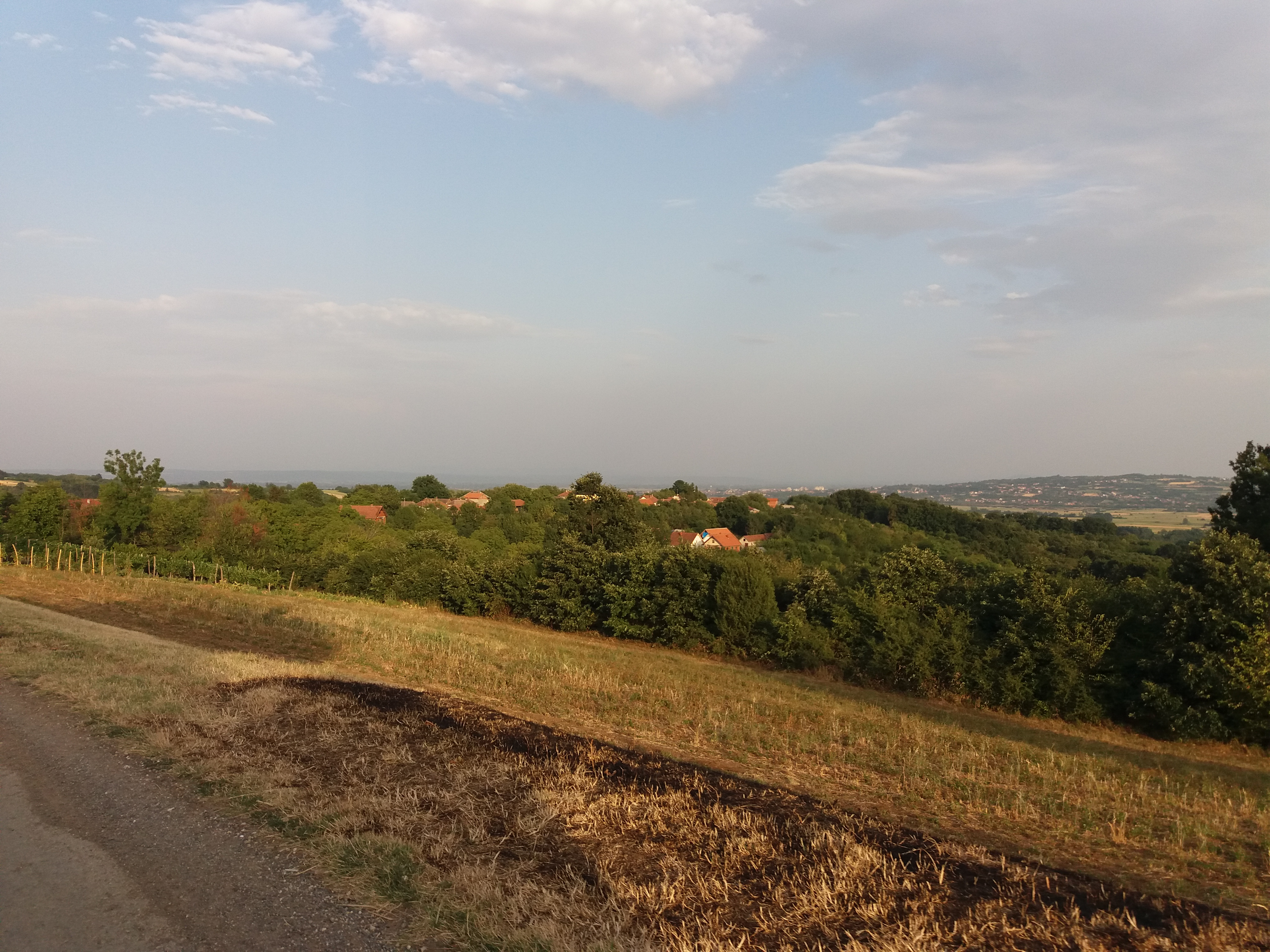
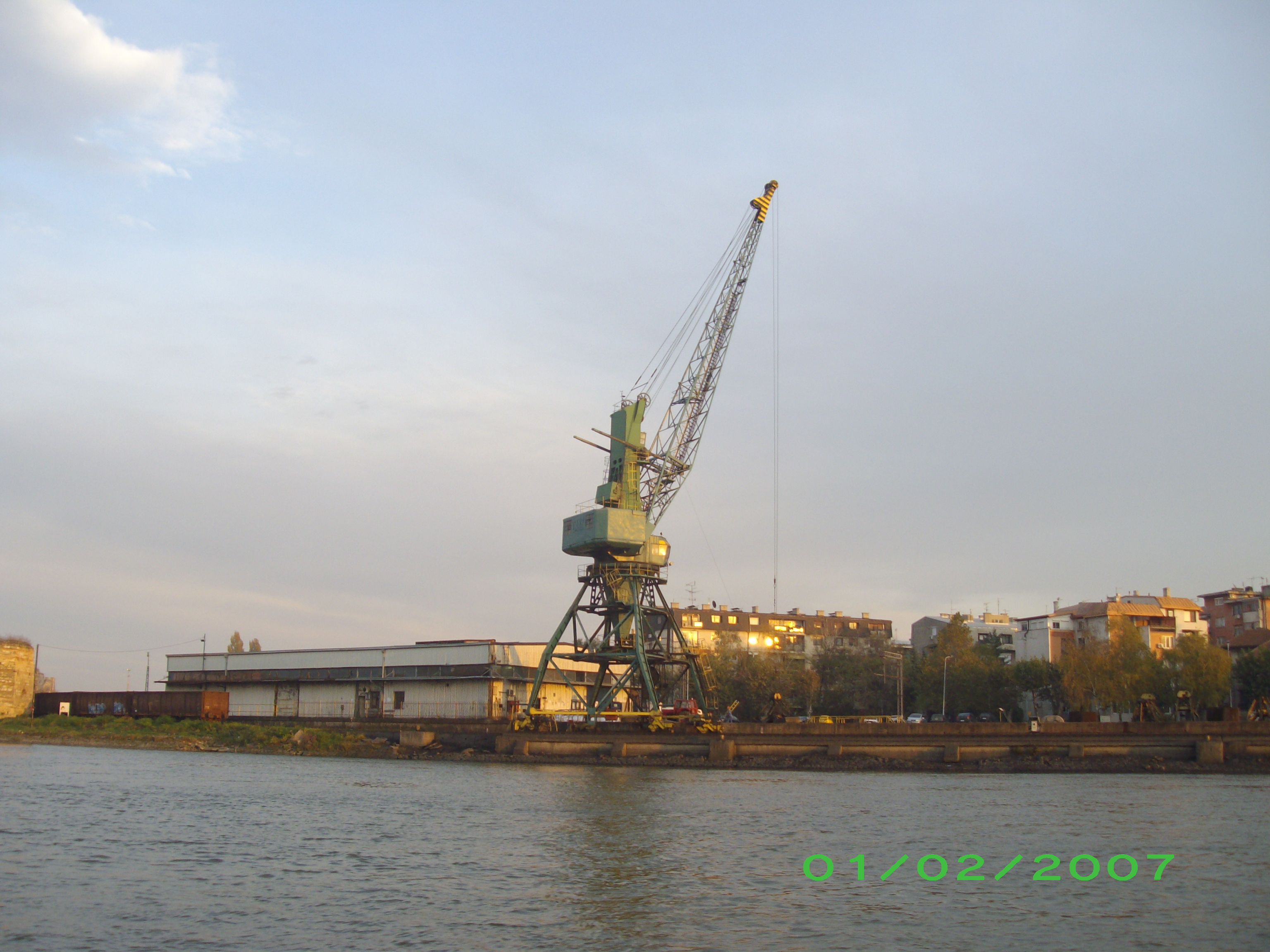
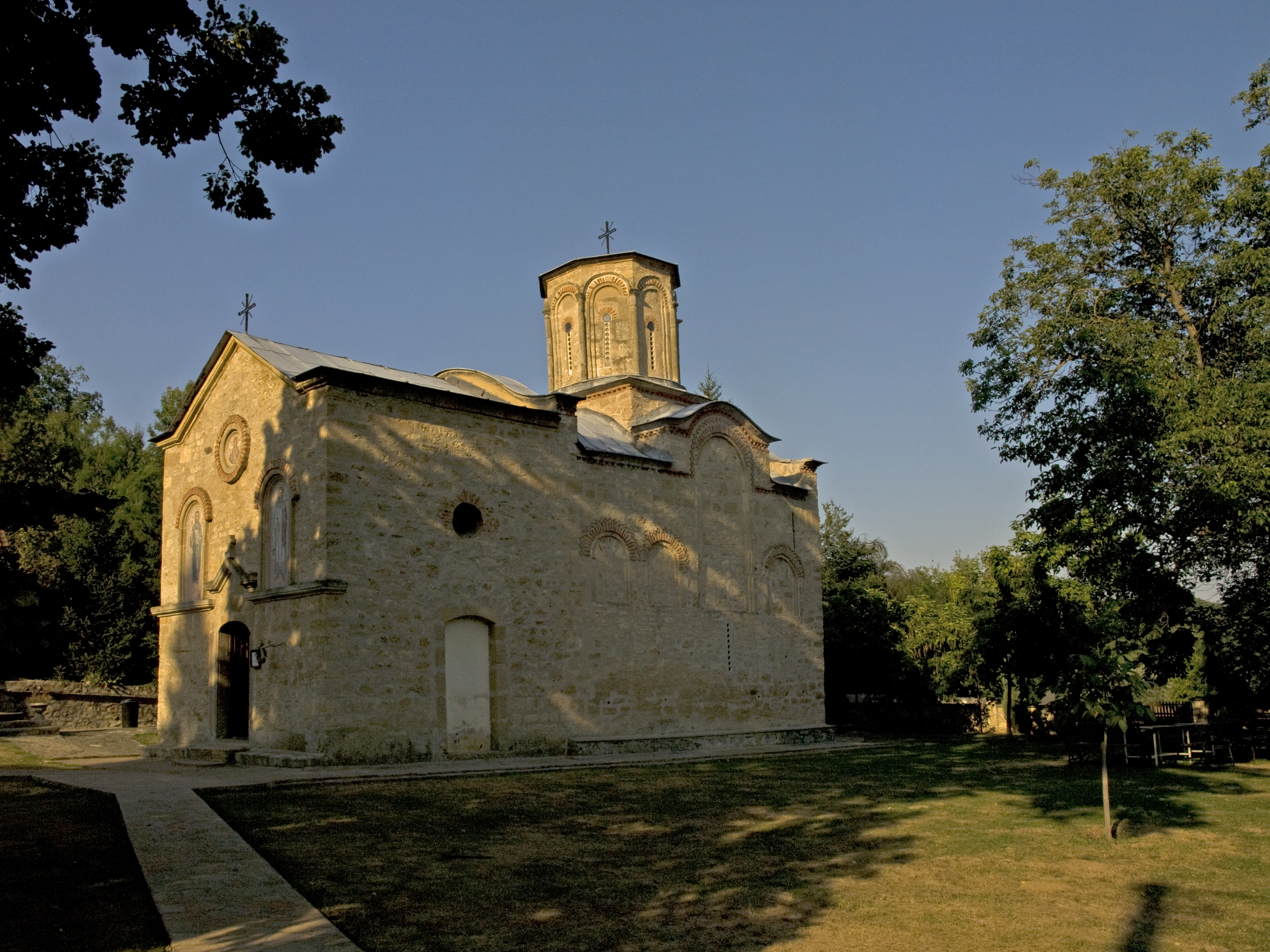
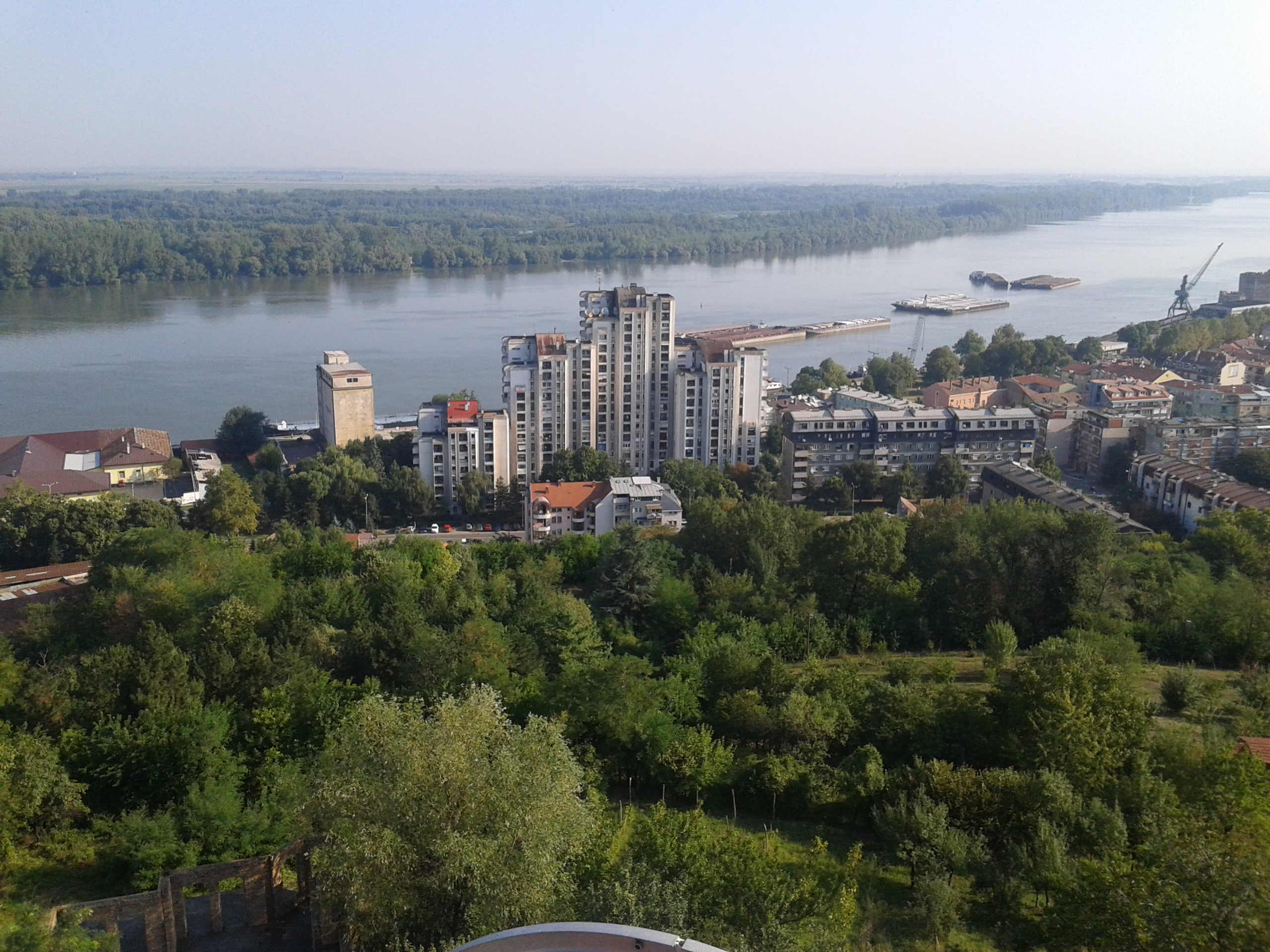
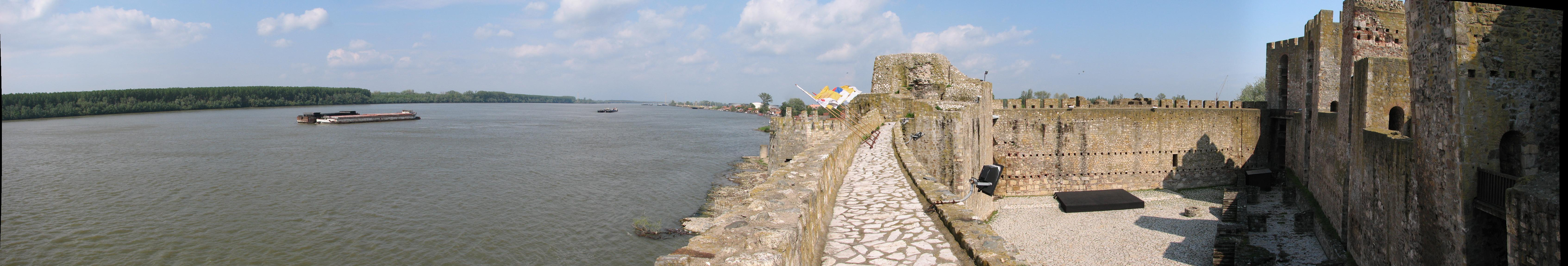
- Images from the Podunavlje District

- Location of district in Serbia
- Coordinates: 44°40′N 20°56′E
- Country: Serbia
- Administrative center: Smederevo

Government
  - Commissioner: Jasna Avramović

Area
  - Total: 1,248 km^{2} (482 sq mi)

Population (2022)
  - Total: 175,573
  - Density: 141.8/km^{2} (367/sq mi)
- ISO 3166 code: RS-10
- Municipalities: 2 and 1 city
- Settlements: 58
- Cities and towns: 3
- Villages: 55
- Website: podunavskiokrug.rs

The Podunavlje District (Serbian: Подунавски округ, romanized: Podunavski okrug, pronounced [pôdǔnaʋskiː ôkruːɡ]) is one of administrative districts of Serbia. It lies in the central part of the country. According to the 2022 census, it has a population of 175,573 inhabitants. The administrative center of the Podunavlje District is the city of Smederevo.

== History ==
The present-day administrative districts (including Podunavlje District) were established in 1992 by the decree of the Government of Serbia.

== Cities and municipalities ==
The Podunavlje District encompasses the territories of one city and two municipalities:

- Smederevo (city)
- Smederevska Palanka (municipality)
- Velika Plana (municipality)

== Demographics ==
Historical population
Year	Pop.	±%
1948	153,039	—
1953	164,975	+7.8%
1961	180,122	+9.2%
1971	197,205	+9.5%
1981	220,425	+11.8%
1991	226,089	+2.6%
2002	209,987	−7.1%
2011	199,395	−5.0%
2022	175,573	−11.9%

=== Towns ===
There are three towns with over 10,000 inhabitants:

- Smederevo: 59,261
- Smederevska Palanka: 20,345
- Velika Plana: 14,609

=== Ethnic structure ===
Ethnicity	Population	Share
Serbs	161,490	92%
Roma	3,393	1.9%
Others	1,618	0.9%
Undeclared/Unknown	9,072	5.1%

== See also ==
- Administrative districts of Serbia
- Administrative divisions of Serbia
