= Statistical regions of Serbia =

Subnational regions

Statistical regions of Serbia Статистички региони Србије Statistički regioni Srbije
- Statistical regions of Serbia
- Category: Unitary state
- Location: Serbia
- Created by: Law on Equal Territorial Development, Law of the Official Statistics
- Created: 2009
- Number: 5 regions
- Populations: 1,406,050 (Southern and Eastern Serbia) – 1,819,318 (Šumadija and Western Serbia)
- Areas: 3,225 km^{2} (1,245 sq mi) (Belgrade) – 26,483 km^{2} (10,225 sq mi) (Šumadija and Western Serbia)

The statistical regions of Serbia (Serbian: статистички региони Србије / statistički regioni Srbije) are regulated by the Law of the Regional Development and the Law of the Official Statistics. Serbia is divided into five statistical regions which are chiefly used for statistical purposes, such as regular statistical data published by the Statistical Office as well as census data. The regions encompass one or multiple administrative districts each.

== Introduction ==
In 2009, National Assembly adopted the Law on Equal Territorial Development that formed seven statistical regions in the territory of Serbia. The Law was amended on 7 April 2010, so that the number of regions was reduced to five. The previously formed region of Eastern Serbia was merged with Southern Serbia and the region of Šumadija was merged with Western Serbia.

The five statistical regions of Serbia are:

- Vojvodina
- Belgrade
- Šumadija and Western Serbia
- Southern and Eastern Serbia
- Kosovo and Metohija

== Classification ==
In a 2010 bylaw, the Government specified a nomenclature of statistic territorial units in the country. The act was an attempt to synchronize the existing statistical division of the country with the Nomenclature of Territorial Units for Statistics of the European Union. According to the act, an additional top level of grouping was introduced, with the territory divided into two NUTS 1 regions:

- Serbia-North (Serbian: Србија-север / Srbija-sever) comprising
  - Vojvodina
  - Belgrade, and
- Serbia-South (Serbian: Србија-југ / Srbija-jug) comprising
  - Šumadija and Western Serbia
  - Southern and Eastern Serbia
  - Kosovo and Metohija

The five statistical regions would therefore become NUTS level 2 regions, while the administrative districts would correspond with NUTS level 3. However, the classification has remained largely in internal and limited use. As of 2013, it has not been sanctioned by the European Union. According to a 2011 whitepaper by ESPON, which discusses the possibility to include Albania, Serbia, Montenegro and Bosnia and Herzegovina into NUTS nomenclature, "the statistical NUTS1 and NUTS2 regions created by the government in order to meet the NUTS criteria as well as the requirements of the EU regional policy, do not have actually a considerable administrative power; also, they are not self-governed entities. The political criterion prevailed for their creation."

Officially, NUTS regions only exist for EU member states. For EFTA, EU candidate and potential candidate countries, the European Commission agrees with the countries concerned on a nomenclature referred to as "statistical regions".

== See also ==
- Administrative divisions of Serbia
- List of Serbian regions by GDP
- List of Serbian regions by Human Development Index
