= Burning of the Inns =

15 February 1804 Serb rebel burning of Turk inns

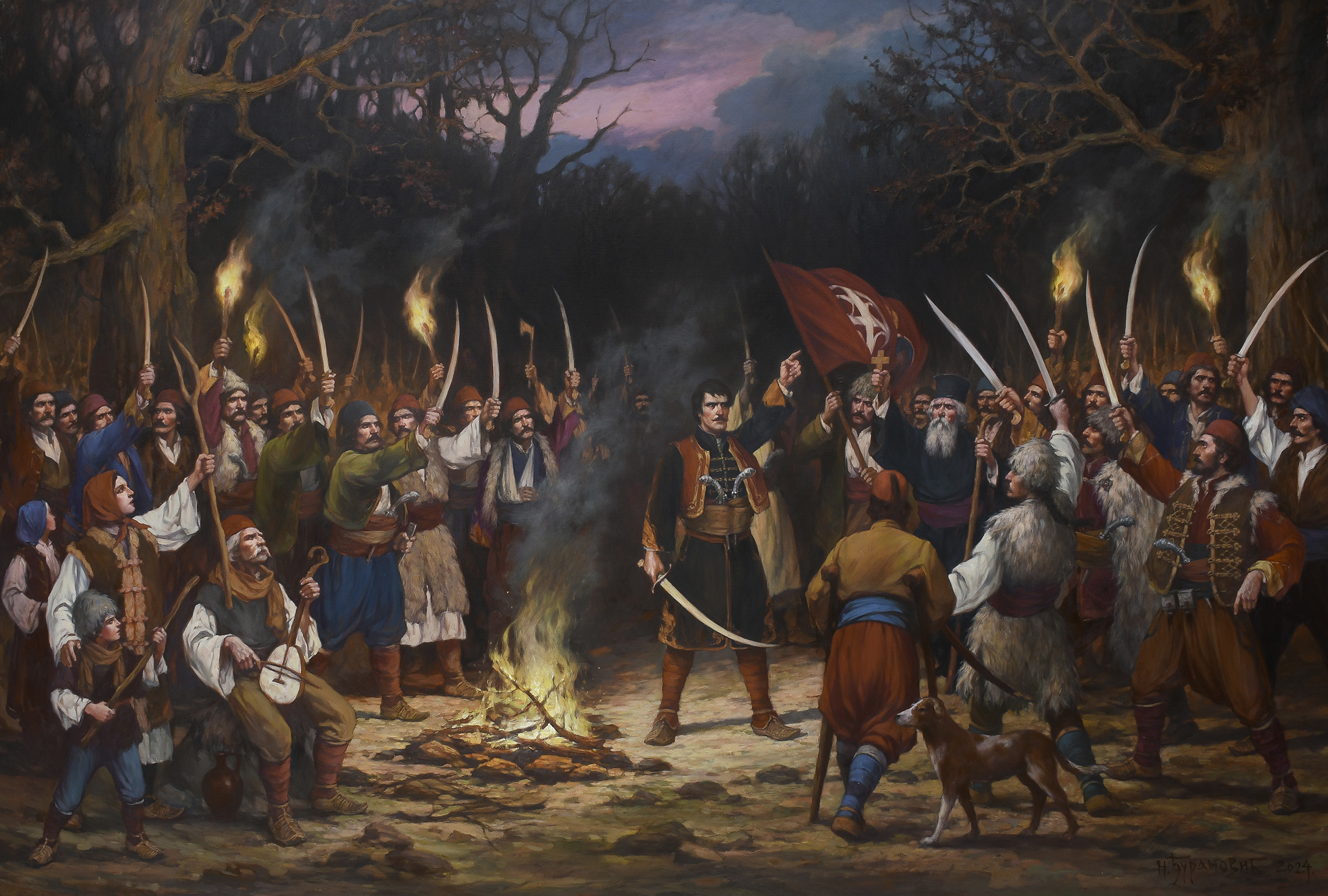
The Serbian rebel assembly at Orašac, after which inns in Šumadija were burnt down.

The Burning of the Inns refers to the first actions undertaken by Serb rebels in the Belgrade Pashalik on 15 February 1804, as part of their uprising against the Dahije, the renegade Janissaries that had wrested the Pashalik and ruled in tyranny since 1801 and had placed their followers throughout the administration and henchmen in the villages and in inns (the so-called handžije) that were also used as tools to abuse the Serb population. The Dahije organized the Slaughter of the Knezes which saw notable Serbs murdered throughout the province, with the participation of innkeepers. The Orašac Assembly was held on 14 February 1804, proclaiming the start of uprising. Immediately, rebels set out to burn down inns, kill Dahije followers and gather armed men.

== Background ==
Following the Austro-Turkish War (1788–91), the Porte gave amnesty to the Austrian-supporting Serbs, and banned the problematic Janissaries from the Belgrade Pashalik, as they were a source of disorder, due to lack of discipline and bad morals. External threats made the Porte allow for the return of the Janissaries in early 1799. The reign of Selim III (1789–1806) saw internal conflicts, with tumult among the pashas, ayans and kırcalıs. The Janissaries renewed terror, plundering and killing in the interior of the Pashalik, then proceeded to capture Belgrade and ruling the Pashalik in 1801, led by Aganlija, Kučuk-Alija, Mula-Jusuf and Mehmed-aga Fočić, known as the Dahije. The Pashalik became a haven for Janissaries and other bandits, coming from Bosnia, Albania and elsewhere in Rumelia, and they came into conflict with the Serbs, sipahi (cavalry) and ordinary "Turks". The Dahije abolished the Serbs' rights, banished unsupportive sipahi and invited Muslims from nearby sanjaks which they used to control the Serbs.

The Dahije learnt of conspiracies to overthrow them in 1803, started monitoring the Serbs and then decided to kill Serb leaders in order to thwart a rebellion against them. The Dahije gave orders to their mutasallims and others, such as innkeepers, to kill Serb notables, but still personally involved themselves. The innkeepers (handžije) and subaşı, the Dahije henchmen, were especially cruel. While murders began in late December, most were in the second half of January, between 23–29 January. The murders resulted in flight and instances of armed resistance.

The Orašac Assembly was a secret meeting held on 14 February 1804 to decide for an uprising, with several hundred participants, mostly from the Kragujevac nahiya, including Austrian veteran, hajduk (brigand) and merchant Karađorđe, his friend and also veteran and hajduk Stanoje Glavaš, the knez and merchant Teodosije Marićević, Glavaš's hajduk Veljko Petrović, veteran Arsenije Loma, Karađorđe's associate Tanasko Rajić, among others. During the assembly, Karađorđe made a speech to those present:

Here we are brothers, in the name of God rising up against the Turks, who cut down our knezes, steal our property, enslave and pillage us, dishonour our wives, sisters and daughters, trample on our honesty, defile our churches and monasteries, and many other zulum (atrocities) they do to us ... Now brothers, if your adhere, as I have begun and as I believe, God willing, it will be fine for our people, that we rise up all of our people; we will burn down all inns and Turk chardaks in the villages, kill the handžije and subaşı, drive the Turks to the cities, so that they no more commit atrocities on our people.

The speech made the people opt for Karađorđe to lead the uprising but he suggested others, who rejected the offers. It was decided that the uprising start immediately and Karađorđe was chosen to lead. Letters were sent to other notable Serbs throughout the Belgrade Pashalik, such as merchant Đuša Vulićević, Milenko Stojković, Petar Dobrnjac and Milan Obrenović, including also participants in the 1803 conspiracy, to rise up.

== History ==
After the assembly, Karađorđe's men burnt down the Orašac inn, but saved the local Turks who were his friends, and did the same at Topola, ensuring their safe passage to Muslim-inhabited territory. The inns were symbols of Ottoman and Dahije oppression, and Karađorđe decided that the inns would be burnt at night for the flames to be seen and putting fear in Turks and encouraging Serbs. Karađorđe had sent his men, including knez Jovan and Petar Jokić from Topola, and Jakov Tomković and Aleksa Dukić from Banja, to burn down the inns in their villages. The Topola area villagers burnt down the inns at Topola, Žabari and Jagnjilo.

Karađorđe wrote letters through Janićije Đurić, who now became his secretary, to his associates and notable Serbs throughout the province, such as Smederevo nahiya notables Đuša Vulićević in Azanja, Obrad in Krsna; Požarevac nahiya notables Milenko Stojković in Kličevac, Petar Dobrnjac in Dobrnje, Momir in Lučica; Ćuprija nahiya notables Stefan Sinđelić and Milija Zdravković of the Resava knežina; Jagodina nahiya notables knez Jefta of Temnić, knez Miloje of Levač, knez Mijuško; Rudnik nahiya notables merchant Milan Obrenović, Milić Drinčić, Lazar Mutap; Belgrade nahiya notables Janko Katić in Rogača, knez Sima Marković of Borak, knez Vićentije in Koraćica. They were called to rise up, burn the Turk inns in Serb villages, destroy the handžije and subaşı.

The flames of these burnt Turk inns fanned far;
it was the most vivid and electric signal,
that multiplied the power of defending freedom in many Serbs.

— Batalaka, History of the Serbian Uprising (1898)

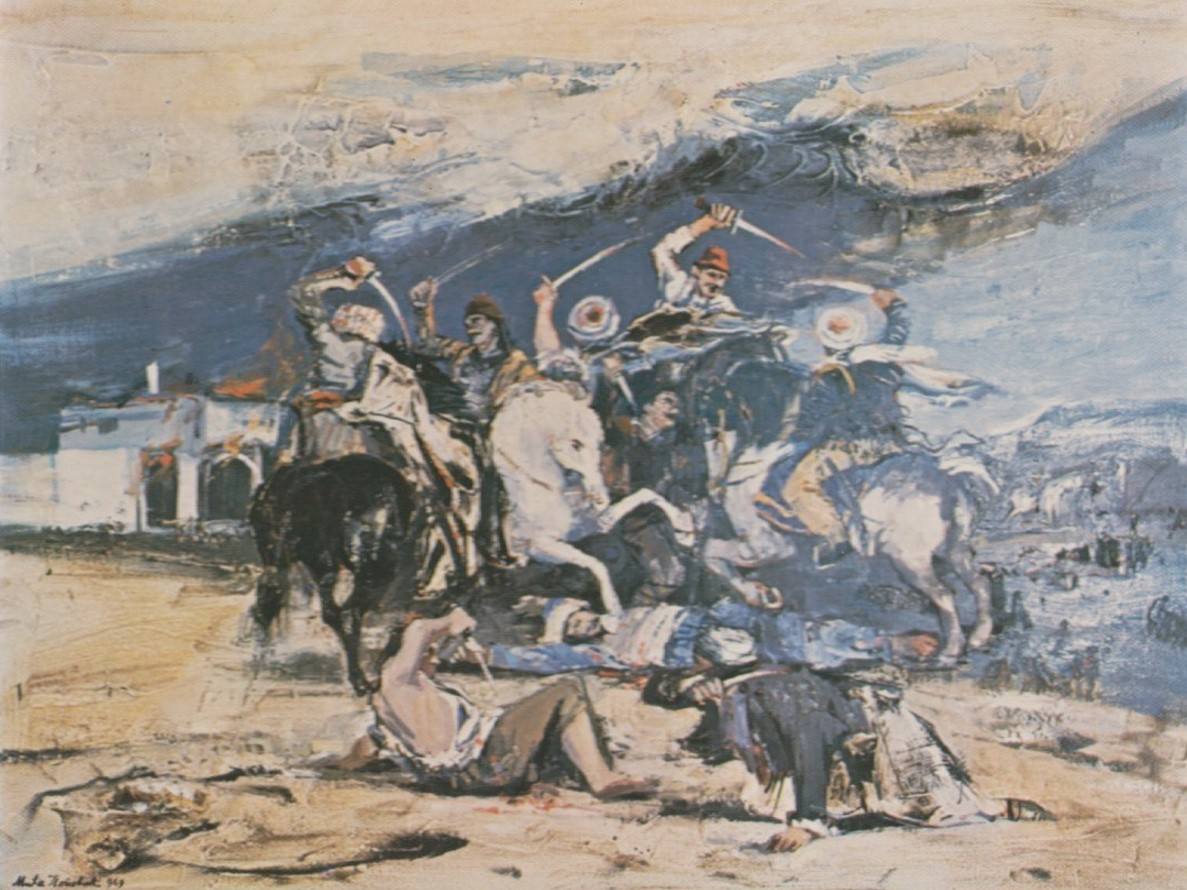
Burning of the Inns by Mića Popović (1949).

Karađorđe and his men went to Ranilović and Drlupa where the inns were burnt down and the handžije killed, then went to Rogača to find Janko Katić, who still was in hiding from the Dahije, and took his brother Marko Katić with them, then dealt with the inns and handžije in Dučina and Stojnik. Leaving Stojnik for Sibnica, Karađorđe was approached by two merchants of the Rudnik nahiya, Toma Terzija and Nikola Rakić. They told him they escorted 35 Janissary cavalry sent by the mutesellim of Kragujevac Kučuk-Alija who was at Belgrade, to his brother Sali-aga at Rudnik; these were at Sremčica and would be at the konak (mansion) at Sibnica the next day. The Janissaries were to join Sali-aga and his 200–300 Rudnik Turks and Janissaries in destroying "the hajduks", with the help of 400–500 Turks from Užice, Karanovac, Čačak and Kragujevac.

Arsenije Loma arrived at Stojnik with 80 men, and they together immediately went to Sibnica and killed the already present Janissary camp, and Karađorđe's men then waited in the corner of the inn to ambush the coming Janissary cavalry and Loma was sent to wait in ambush on the Belgrade road if any managed to flee Sibnica. The Janissary cavalry arrived before the inn, unknowing, and the rebels made a surprise attack from all sides, the inn and houses in the village, killing 16, while 17 or 19 fled in panic on the Belgrade road, where they were shot at by Loma's men, and then captured there and brought by Loma, or returned to the village and surrendered to Karađorđe.

At Sibnica, the rebels took important booty which heightened morale, such as good horses, weapons and uniforms, and divided it among the best heroes. Karađorđe immediately sent letters to the Valjevo nahiya leaders Jakov Nenadović, knez Nikola Grbović and knez Milić Kedić, Šabac nahiya leaders Ostoja Spuž and knez Ilija Marković to rise up their areas and defeat and expel the Janissaries.

In ten days, Karađorđe, Glavaš and Marko Katić had burnt the inns and risen the people of and around Ranilović, Drlupa, Rogača, Stojnik, Sibnica, Venčane, Darosava, Koraćica, while Loma did the same in the upper villages of the Rudnik nahiya. The Nenadović family led the uprising in Kolubara to the west of rebel stronghold Šumadija, and Milenko Stojković and Petar Dobrnjac to the east of Morava. In the Šabac nahiya (in Mačva), priest Luka Lazarević and Ostoja Spuž burnt down inns and collected armed men towards the city of Šabac. Dahije Bego Novljanin and Ćurt-oglija who sat at Šabac killed Luka's cousin Ranko at the beginning of 1800 and he was out for revenge.

== Aftermath and legacy ==
The rebel numbers grew up to 2,000 in the days following Sibnica. Hearing that a village elder had discouraged villagers of Venčane to join the uprising, Karađorđe hanged a Janissary corpse from Sibnica at his house. The rich merchant Mladen Milovanović, an associate of Karađorđe, had been imprisoned during the Slaughter of the Knezes by Kučuk-Alija. Kučuk-Alija was the worst of the four leaders of the Dahije. Karađorđe used the captives from Sibnica to negotiate Mladen's release, and threatened Kučuk-Alija that he would raze Kragujevac if he didn't comply; Mladen was freed and sent to Topola and the captives to Kragujevac. The Dahije sent Aganlija to negotiate peace with Karađorđe, but this failed and the uprising expanded. In March, the Turks were holed up in the cities and towns and were besieged.

The burning of the inns and ambush at Sibnica are known in Serbian epic poetry. V. Stojančević assessed that the burning of the inns and killing of Dahije henchmen was the "destruction of the basic Dahije institutions, which were, in actual and symbolic significance, representing their rule, meant the beginning of the ten-year revolutionary struggle of the Serbian people to liberate themselves from the Turk political and economical government, and foundation of an independent and free national state". Đurđe Teodorović (1907–1986) painted Burning of the Inns which is held at the Historical Museum in Belgrade. Božidar Prodanović (1923–2006) painted Burning of the Inns which is held at the Residence of Prince Miloš. Mića Popović (1923–1996) painted Burning of the Inns which was depicted on Yugoslav postcards (included in the article).

== See also ==
- Timeline of the Serbian Revolution

== Annotations ==
1. The events are known as the "Burning of the Inns" (Serbian: паљење ханова/paljenje hanova). In Serbian, han is the word for Ottoman-era inns. The Dahije followers, Janissaries, that were based in and around these inns were called handžije (ханџије).
2. According to P. Jokić, who participated at the Orašac Assembly, the Topola area villagers burnt down the inns at Topola, Žabari and Jagnjilo, just prior to the Orašac Assembly: Aleksa Dukić led a group of Banjans who burnt down the Topola inn and then Žabari inn, and then joined up with Jokić, numbering 70–80 men, who then burnt down the Jagnjilo inn, and they informed Karađorđe the day prior to the Orašac Assembly. According to Batalaka, it was Karađorđe who sent the bands to burn down said inns.

== Sources ==
- Batalaka, Lazar Arsenijević (1898). Историја српског устанка. Vol. I. Izd. Batalakinoga fonda.
- Bodrožić, Đuro (2019). "Nacionalna država u Prvom srpskom ustanku". Politička revija. 62 (4): 87–107.
- Gavrilović, Andra (1904). "Сеча кнезова". Црте из историје ослобођења Србије. Belgrade: Нздање дворске књижаре Мите Стајића у Београду. pp. 7–42 – via Archive.org.
- Graovac, Srđan (9 March 2018), "Карађорђе и Српска револуција 1804. године: РАЂАЊЕ СЛОБОДЕ", Agora, KCNS
- Jokić, Petar; Milićević, M. Đ. (1891) [1852]. Причање Петра Јокића о догађајима и људима из првог српског устанка. Споменик XIV. У Државној штампарији Краљевне Србије. pp. 17-.
- Ljubojević, Ratko Lj.; Radović-Stojanović, Jelena V. (2022). "Терор османских власти над српским народом". Тематски зборник „СТРАХ У НАУЧНОМ И УМЕТНИЧКОМ СТВАРАЛАШТВУ“. Лепосавић: Институт за српску културу Приштина: 495–510. ISBN 978-86-89025-80-4.
- Milićević, Milan Đ. (1888). Поменик знаменитих људи у српског народа новијега доба. Издање Чупићеве задужбине – via Archive.org.
- Nedeljković, Slaviša D.; Đorđević, Miloš Z. (2015). "Политичке прилике у београдском пашалуку у предвечерје српске револуције (1787-1804)". Teme. XXXIX (3). Niš: 965–969.
- Nenadović, Konstantin N. (1884). Живот и дела великог Ђорђа Петровића Кара-Ђорђа. Vol. II (1 ed.). Vienna: У Штампарији Јована Н. Вернаја – via Google Books.
- Novaković, Stojan (1904). Устанак на дахије 1804. Штампано у Државној штампарији – via Archive.org.
- Protić, Kosta (1893). "Ратни догађаји из првога српског устанка под Карађорђем Петровићем 1804—1813". Годишњица Николе Чупића. XIII. Državna štamparija.
