= Siege of Požarevac (1804) =

Battle part of the first Serbian uprising

- Part of the First Serbian Uprising
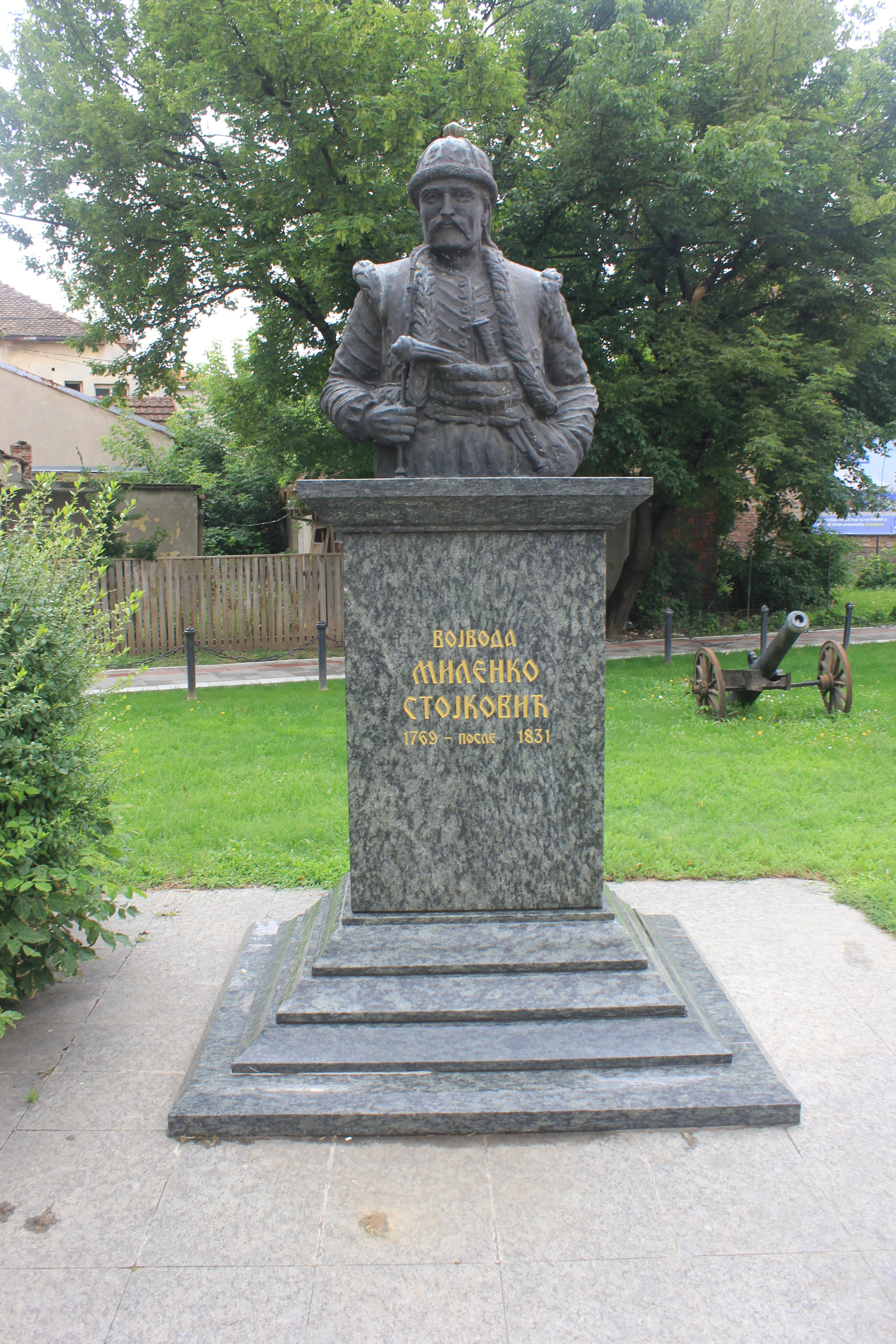
- Monument to Milenko Stojković in the city
Date	March–late May 1804
Location	Požarevac, Sanjak of Smederevo, Ottoman Empire (today Serbia)
Result	Serbian victory
Territorial changes	Požarevac in rebel hands

Belligerents
Serbian rebels	Dahije; Sanjak of Vidin; Ottoman city garrison

Commanders and leaders
Milenko Stojković; Karađorđe; Jakov Nenadović	Mula-Jusuf; Kuçuk Sali Agha; Ibrahim-aga †

Units involved
Combined nahija troops	Janissaries kırcalı Požarevac deli and local soldiers Vidin deli

Casualties and losses
Small	Many

The Siege of Požarevac was undertaken by the Serbian rebel army led by Milenko Stojković, Karađorđe and Jakov Nenadović against the town of Požarevac, in the hands of the Dahije (renegade Janissaries) supported by the Sanjak of Vidin. Požarevac was an important city in the province, laying in the east of rebel territory and serving as a reinforcement point of the Dahije and their allies. Left without support, the town surrendered after five days and was handed over to the Serbs with the agreed emigration of the Muslim population to Adakale or Vidin.

== Background ==
In the beginning of the uprising, Požarevac had c. 1,000 "Turk" houses and 1,500 abled men and Janissaries. Since the summer of 1797, Požarevac was a haven for the Janissaries, also called Vidinlije, and Požarevac became an important Dahije military center with 1,500 armed men. The Požarevac Turks were staunch supporters of the Dahije, who had killed the brother of their enemy Asam-beg, the defterdar (financial minister) of Vizier Hadji Mustafa Pasha. The leader in Požarevac was Kuçuk Sali Agha Arslanović, who participated in the Slaughter of the Knezes by killing knez Rajica of Zabrđe and an Orthodox priest in the city. Also, the Livadica village in the Požarevac nahiya was burnt down and people were killed. The murders alarmed the other knezes in the Požarevac nahiya, who received news of the rebellion in Šumadija and were called upon to join, leading them to organize rebellion and mustering men on 13 March [O.S. 1 March] 1804.

The Morava and Stig areas of the nahiya were risen by Momir of Lučica; the Ram, Pek, Rečica, Zvižd and Poreč areas were risen by Milenko Stojković from Kličevac; the Gornja Mlava and Homolje areas were risen by Petar Dobrnjac, Paulj Matejić and Ilija Stošić.

== History ==
Milenko, camped at Trnjane on the Mogila, and Momir, camped at Lučica, decided to join forces and both set out for Požarevac. Small detachments were defeated by Milenko on his way to Požarevac via Ćirikovac. The Požarevac Turks became angry hearing about Milenko's appearance, as they fed the city from Kostolac, on the road between Ćirikovac and Požarevac. A couple of days following the appearance of the Serbian rebels at Ćirikovac, Požarevac sent a unit led by Ibrahim-aga, the brother of Dahije leader Mula-Jusuf, that was destroyed and Ibrahim-aga himself fell. Momir likewise defeated small detachments sent to stop him from arriving at Požarevac.

Milenko and Momir gathered outside Požarevac, the former camping at Brdnja Mala, the latter at Gornja Mala, where they built earthwork fortifications. The Požarevac Turks feared that they wouldn't be able to withstand an attack and negotiated with Milenko between 26 March–2 April [O.S. 14–21 March] 1804. According to one version, the Turks saw that they couldn't withstand an attack and agreed on an armistice, wishing to surrender to Karađorđe personally. According to another version, the two sides were in a stalemate, Milenko's army unable to finalize due to insufficient military power, the Turks unable to break free. According to K. Protić, the two sides were peaceful for a time, while according to Batalaka, Milenko held the city in strict siege and the Janissaries sortied several times, ending in failure and retreat to the fortress trenches. Milenko awaited reinforcements to finally conquer the city. Karađorđe, who began serious operations in the siege of Belgrade, received a request for military aid from Milenko and Đorđe Ćurčija, around 10 May. Mladen Milovanović was left to organize the action against Belgrade.

Karađorđe and Jakov Nenadović combined their armies, and were accompanied by some lesser commanders, and set out for Požarevac. They arrived in late May (mid-May according to the Old Calendar), crossing the Morava at Batovac, with a cannon that they had used in the siege of Šabac. Among the commanders present in Karađorđe's army were Janko Katić, Jakov Nenadović, Milan and Miloš Obrenović, Živko Dabić, Sima Marković, knez Peja, Stanoje Glavaš, Hajduk-Veljko, Kara-Steva from Provo, Hajduk-Milovan from Plana, Milovan Kušljak, Ostoja Spuž and Đorđe Ćurčija. At the same time, Dobrnjac, Paulj and Stošić arrived with their units. There are somewhat different versions of the intensity of the siege following Karađorđe's arrival. The city was besieged from the foothills of Sopot, and two cannon shots were fired in the evening. The next day, another four shots were fired, and the Šumadija troops entered the town and set fire to houses on the outskirts. The town (varoš) and fortress trenches where the Janissaries were fortified were surrounded. The bulk of men were provided by Milenko and he was instrumental in the attack. The city was bombarded with cannons, destroying houses in the town and breaking the palisades around the trenches. According to V. Karadžić and Batalaka, Karađorđe bombarded the city with the cannon for five days, until the Turks surrendered, while according to K. Protić, the second day of the arrival of Karađorđe's army, Mula-Jusuf signaled for surrender.

According to K. Protić, they agreed on that the Turks leave with their movable property to Vidin, while all immovable property be transferred to the Serbs. According to Batalaka, the city surrendered on the conditions that they pay war reparations, pay the rebel commanders, and be allowed to leave in peace on ships on the Danube to Adakale or Vidin. The surrender and implementation were in the days of 28 May–1 June [O.S. 16–20 May] 1804, as dated by archpriest Matija Nenadović in his Memoirs. Gavrilo Kovačević dated the handover to 29 May [O.S. 17 May] 1804. The Turks were escorted via Veliko Gradište to Vidin, while a small number of families were allowed to settle Gradište. The malefactors in the city were separated and executed. Požarevac now fell into Serbian hands.

Karađorđe received 50 bags of coins, many noble horses, sabres, knives and other good weaponry, which he divided among the commanders, and 1,000 or 10,000 sheep, which he gave to Milenko and his army, as he had besieged Požarevac since the beginning.

== Aftermath and legacy ==
Karađorđe stayed and organized the Požarevac nahija for a couple of days, and recognized Milenko, Dobrnjac and Momir as knezes in the nahija. The Požarevac nahija army was ordered to support the siege of Belgrade, while Karađorđe took the Šumadija and Podrinje troops towards Smederevo, which was then attacked under the command of Karađorđe and Jakov. After the conquest of Požarevac, Đorđe Ćurčija allegedly had a falling out with both Karađorđe and Jakov due to the division of loot. After Požarevac, Ćurčija went with his men to Mačva where they pushed out Jakov's men and took control of the area, then fought Bekir Pasha who had crossed the Drina from Bosnia.

== See also ==
- Timeline of the Serbian Revolution
- Serbian Army (revolutionary)
- List of Serbian Revolutionaries

== Annotations ==
1. It is known in historiography as the "conquest of Požarevac" (Serbian: osvojenje Požarevca), "liberation of Požarevac" (oslobođenje Požarevca), etc.
2. Known as Kučuk-Sali-aga Arslanović and Kučuk Salija Arslanović. He was one of many kabadahija, most loyal Janissaries.

== Sources ==
- Batalaka, Lazar Arsenijević (1898). Историја српског устанка: део први [History of the Serbian Uprising: Part One]. Vol. I. Izd. Batalakinoga fonda – via Google Books.
- Milićević, Milan Đ. (1888). Поменик знаменитих људи у српског народа новијега доба. Издање Чупићеве задужбине – via Archive.org.
- Nenadović, Konstantin N. (1884). Живот и дела великог Ђорђа Петровића Кара-Ђорђа [Life and Deeds of Great Đorđe Petrović Kara-Đorđe]. Vol. II (1 ed.). Vienna: У Штампарији Јована Н. Вернаја – via Google Books.
- Nenadović, Konstantin N. (1903) [1883]. Живот и дела великог Ђорђа Петровића Кара-Ђорђа [Life and Deeds of Great Đorđe Petrović Kara-Đorđe]. Vol. I (2 ed.). Belgrade: Штампа Савића и Комп. – via Archive.org.
- Novaković, Stojan (1904). Устанак на дахије 1804 [Uprising against the Dahije]. Штампано у Државној штампарији. pp. 170- – via Archive.org.
- Protić, Kosta (1893). "Ратни догађаји из првога српског устанка под Карађорђем Петровићем 1804—1813". Годишњица Николе Чупића. XIII. Državna štamparija.
