= Dahije =

Renegade janissary officers who took power in Ottoman Serbia (1799–1804)

- Dahije
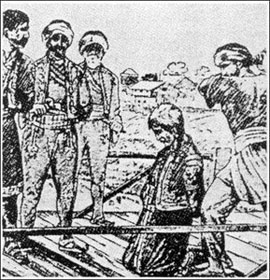
- Dahije beheading a Serb knez (Slaughter of the Knezes).
- Leaders: Mehmed-aga Fočić; Kučuk-Alija; Aganlija; Mula Jusuf
- Dates active: 15 December 1799 — 5–6 August 1804
- Headquarters: Belgrade

The Dahije (Serbian Cyrillic: Дахије, from Turkish: dayı) were the renegade Janissary officers who revolted against the Ottoman Sultan Mahmud II and took power in the Pashalik of Belgrade, after capturing and murdering Vizier Hadji Mustafa Pasha in 1801. The four supreme Dahije leaders were Mehmed-aga Fočić, Kučuk Alija, Aganlija and Mula Jusuf. Rebels against the sultan, they were defeated by the Serbs in the initial phase of the First Serbian Uprising, which is also called "Uprising against the Dahije" (Serbian: Буна против дахија; Buna protiv dahija).

== Background ==
The Ottomans declared war on Russia in 1787 and Austria joined in February 1788. In 1787 the Serbs were violently disarmed by the Ottoman authorities during the Austrian war preparations, with terror carried out by military and bashi-bazouk irregular units leading to people fleeing across the Sava and Danube to Austrian territory and forming the Serbian Free Corps. The Serb volunteers actively engaged Ottoman troops, raided ships on the Danube and liberated many towns, however, much needed aid and equipment was denied and Ottoman counter-operations and terror led to 50,000 Serb refugees and the signing of a truce. The Austrian court increasingly sought to end the conflict and peace was signed in August 1791.

The Porte gave amnesty to participants on the Austrian side and banned the Janissaries from the Belgrade Pashalik. The Janissaries had before been part of the backbone of Ottoman military power but had lost their importance in the 18th century, becoming a source of disorder, due to lack of discipline and bad morals. It was clear that military reforms according to European models were needed, thus the Porte decided to banish them.

== Janissary rebellion ==
Hadji Mustafa Pasha became the Vizier of Belgrade (the Sanjak of Smederevo, known as the "Belgrade Pashalik") in July 1793. A Janissary that remained in Belgrade and sought to become Janissary agha of all of the Pashalik, Kara-Smail, was assassinated on the order of Hadji Mustafa Pasha, which put fear in other Janissaries who fled to the Sanjak of Vidin. Some remained, such as Bego Novljanin and Ćurtoglija from Bosnia, who lived in Šabac. Mustafa Pasha was remembered positively in Serbian history, having improved the situation in the Pashalik through reforms. The renegade Janissaries from the Sanjak of Vidin under Osman Pazvantoglu sought to wrest the Belgrade Pashalik, and Mustafa Pasha thus took help from Serbian knezes that mustered a militia to fight the Janissaries in case of an invasion, numbering some 15,000, many of whom had gained military training and experience in the last war.

In 1796 the Janissaries invaded the Belgrade Pashalik. The Janissaries under the command of Tosun Agha (Serbian: Tosun-aga) entered the Belgrade Pashalik splitting up into two groups, one which took over Ćuprija in the southeast, the other which attacked Požarevac in the east, clashing with the militia under the direct command of Stanko Arambašić. The Janissaries defeated Arambašić and proceeded to Belgrade, where they took over the lower town (varoš). Vizier Mustafa Pasha closed himself and his small number of soldiers into the Belgrade Fortress. Aleksa, Grbović and Birčanin mustered the Valjevo nahiya militia which together with the sipahi and Mustafa Pasha's entourage assaulted the Janissaries that had taken the lower town and successfully pushed them out of Belgrade. Birčanin and Karađorđe pursued the Janissaries to Smederevo, where they closed themselves in the Smederevo Fortress, so Mustafa Pasha sent cannons with which Smederevo was bombarded, forcing the Janissaries to leave, and they were pursued all the way back to Vidin. The Janissaries once again tried to occupy the Pashalik but were defeated at Kolari, which showed that the Serbian militia were well-organized, disciplined and trained. As a reward for the aid, the Porte issued firmans (decrees) which forbade violence against Christians, gave Serbs self-governing privileges, better socio-economic status, allowed for them to build churches and their rural chiefs (titled knez) to retain security forces.

== Control of the Belgrade Pashalik ==
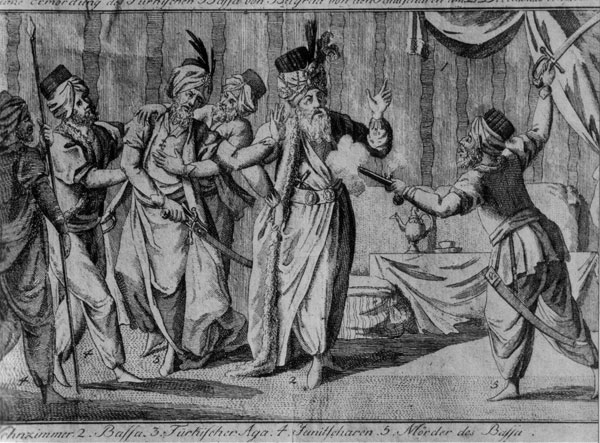
Dahije killing Mustafa Pasha.

The reign of Selim III (1789–1806) saw internal conflicts, with tumult among the pashas, ayans and kircalis. New conflicts with Janissaries arose and the threat of the French in Egypt made the Porte allow for the return of the Janissaries to the Pashalik in early 1799.

In 1800, the Janissaries under Mehmed-aga Fočić, Kučuk-Alija, Aganlija and Mula Jusuf moved from the Sanjak of Vidin and entered the Belgrade Pashalik and took control of most of the province, and then took over Belgrade itself.

The Janissary aghas Bego Novljanin and Ćurtoglija who lived in Šabac murdered knez Ranko Lazarević in 1800, then demanded money from his family. The knez Aleksa Nenadović, one of the most influential Serb leaders, protested to Vizier Hadji Mustafa Pasha, who had the duo attacked at the Šabac Fortress on 17 April [O.S. 5 April] 1800 by 600 or 800 kircali (mercenaries), who caught and executed 27, 28 or 36 of their men, while the duo fled to Bosnia.

Upon their return, the Janissaries renewed terror against the Serbs, captured Belgrade and Mustafa Pasha in July 1801, murdered him in December, then ruled the Pashalik with a Vizier as their puppet. The Janissaries had plotted with the Vidin Pashalik. The leading Janissaries, called the Dahije, abolished the Serbs' firmans, banished unsupportive sipahi and invited Muslims from nearby sanjaks which they used to control the Serbs. At Šabac, they put Mus-aga Fočić, the brother of Mehmed-aga, as Dahije chief. Oppression and tyranny continued. Aleksa, Grbović and Birčanin with other knezes secretly met at the Čokešina Monastery where they wrote an appeal to the Sultan regarding the Janissaries, and sent it via Austria to the Porte. The Dahije were then threatened by the Porte that a great army would be sent if they did not end with oppressing the rayah. The banished sipahi and loyal Muslims organized a rebellion against the Janissaries with the support of the Serbs in mid-1802, but it failed, resulting in further oppression. A rebellion in Požarevac was thwarted by the Dahije as it broke out prematurely.

The tyranny endured by the Serbs caused them to send a petition to the Sultan, which the Dahije learnt of, and fearing that the Sultan would make use of the Serbs to oust them they decided to execute leading Serbs throughout the Pashalik, in the event known as the "Slaughter of the Knezes".

== Uprising ==
The Slaughter of the Knezes in late January prompted the Serbs to rise up against the Dahije, thereby starting the Serbian Revolution. After the Orašac Assembly held on 14 February 1804, Karađorđe's rebels went to Šumadija villages where they burnt down the Turk inns, killed Dahije henchmen (handžije) and collected men. The rebel numbers grew up to 2,000 in the following days, and the Dahije were threatened, sending Aganlija to negotiate peace, but this failed and the uprising expanded. Next, Rudnik was attacked, held by the infamous Sali-aga, the brother of Kučuk-Alija. It was taken by 6 March, but Sali-aga managed to Čačak with 200–300 men. Kučuk-Alija intercepted Karađorđe's guard at Vrbica awaiting the rebel army on 14 March, and in a short battle Karađorđe lost some men but retreated into safety in the mountains, while Kučuk-Alija went to Kragujevac to deter the Serbs in the area from rising up, and to muster more troops.

The Serbian rebels destroyed a Dahije army at Kijevo, with up to 400 dead enemies, at the end of March 1804. A kırcalı (bandit mercenary) unit under Alija Gušanac was defeated near Ćuprija in the days prior, being thwarted 2–3 times from joining up with Kučuk-Alija at Jagodina and breaking through to Belgrade. Gušanac managed to break through to Jagodina in late March, owing partly to the weak Serbian defensive points around the town. Bad weather resulted in a failed siege of Jagodina in which the Serbian rebels were defeated and dispersed, around the last day of March. The blockade of Belgrade was strengthened, and after the first battle at Jagodina, the Serbian rebels mustered a new army and planned for a better attack, and succeeded with an assault on Jagodina on 16 April led by Karađorđe, killed 300, captured many, and forced Kučuk-Alija to flee. After the victory at Jagodina, smaller rebel units pursued Kučuk-Alija through Šumadija, successfully ambushing twice in 17–18 April. By now, only Belgrade, Smederevo and Požarevac were among important cities held by the Janissaries, all blocked by the rebels.

After the takeover of Požarevac (late May) and Smederevo (4 June), only Belgrade remained outside rebel control in the north of the Belgrade Pashalik. In mid-June 1804, a large Serbian rebel army with the most important commanders mustered outside Belgrade. There are claims of up to 16,000 rebels, out of which 6,000 planned to assault the city. At this point, the Sultan issued a ferman (decree) to Karađorđe to not attack the city, as the Sultan had sent for an Ottoman Bosnian army to aid the rebels against the Dahije. The rebels aborted the assault. Vizier Bekir Pasha of Bosnia was given the mission to stop the fighting between the Dahije and Serbs, to bring peace and security to the Belgrade Pashalik and Ottoman frontier. Karađorđe approved of Bekir Pasha's arrival into Serbia, also on the advice of Hadji Sali Bey of Srebrenica, who was a pen pal of Matija Nenadović and had informed the Porte about the Dahije abuse and helped its decision in sending this commission.

The four Dahije leaders had escaped Belgrade on chaikas down the Danube to Adakale, as they feared a conspiracy by mercenary leader Alija Gušanac and not knowing Bekir Pasha's intention with them. The historian K. Nenadović believed that Bekir had in fact allowed the four leaders to secretly leave. Upon hearing of the Dahije leaders' flight, Alija Gušanac looted their mansions, and took control of Belgrade.

Bekir promised improvements on the Serbs' status, while Karađorđe stressed that they would not stop until the Dahije were caught dead or alive, and knowing that the Dahije could muster an army of the Vidin Pashalik and attack at any time, both sides agreed for them to be assassinated. Bekir had insufficient troops to defend against a potential Serb attack, witnessing the strength in the rebel camps in the area, and wanted to enter the Belgrade Fortress as soon as possible. Milenko Stojković carried out the mission, besieging the house at Adakale where the Dahije stayed, shooting them and having their heads cut off and sent to Belgrade where they were put on stakes.

An Austrian report dated 25 August noted that the Porte now believed that the cause of the Serbian uprising had ended with the deaths of the Dahije leaders and that the Porte would ensure peace through righteous and gentle treatment towards the Serbs. One of Bekir Pasha's letters was saved in the Nenadović family, and in it he promises that the Serbs would have a better life than during even Hadji Mustafa Pasha's tenure, but a review shows that no real guarantees were made. The Serbs did not want to return under Ottoman rule and wanted no interference in their affairs; the rebel leadership secretly sent delegations to Austria and Russia to ask for aid and for Serbia to become a protectorate.

After crushing the power of the Dahije, Bekir Pasha wanted the Serbs to be disbanded, however, as the kircali were strong and the Janissaries still held important towns, such as Užice, the Serbs were unwilling to halt without guarantees. The Sultan now ordered the surroundings pashaliks to suppress the Serbs, realizing the threat. The Serbs sought foreign help, sending a delegation to St. Petersburg in September 1804, which returned with money and promise of diplomatic support.

== Leadership ==
The Janissaries chose four of their leading chiefs: Mehmed-aga Fočić, Kučuk Alija, Aganlija, Mula Jusuf to rule the sanjak after the murder of Mustafa Pasha. The leaders divided the sanjak into pashaliks.

=== Mehmed-aga Fočić ===
Mehmed-aga Fočić (Serbian: Мехмед-Ага Фочић), was the son of Fočo Efendija, who served as the kadi official in Loznica. He had a brother named Mus-aga. His father Fočo was against the Dahije's oppression against the Serbs. Fočić was described as the worst of the four leaders.

The attempt in 1802 by the Serbs and Mustafa Pasha's men to revolt in Požarevac failed. After intercepting Aleksa Nenadović's letter to an Austrian officer regarding an uprising against the Dahije, Mehmed-aga planned to murder him and other notables in the Valjevo nahiyah. Through trickery he captured Aleksa, Ilija Birčanin and Nikola Grbović's son Milovan and chained them in the dungeon, then executed Aleksa and Ilija by beheading on the third day, on 23 January 1804. Fočić put the severed heads on display at his house.

=== Kučuk-Alija ===
Kučuk-Alija (Serbian Cyrillic: Кучук-Алија, Turkish: Küçük Ali) was born in the Rudnik nahiyah and belonged to the Đevrlić family. He advanced in Ottoman service from regular Janissary to the position of mütesellim of Kragujevac, which he held for a time prior to the uprising. His wife was the sister of one of his private soldiers (yerli-nefer). His brother was Sali-Aga, the mütesellim of Rudnik nahiya. Kučuk-Alija personally killed Mustafa Pasha and then became one of four leading Janissaries. Kučuk-Alija led troops against the Serbian rebels in March 1804.

=== Aganlija ===
Aganlija or Aganli (Serbian: Аганлија) was a boatman in his youth, born in Bosnia. In the prelude of the Serbian uprising he was çiftlik-sahib of Vranić and governed the Soko nahiya. As he was the most diplomatic of the four leaders he was sent with a strong detachment to talk, calm down or frighten the Serbs upon the outbreak of uprising. Aganlija and his entourage were attacked during talks in Drlupa with Serbian rebel leader Karađorđe in April 1804, and he was wounded in the leg. After Bekir Pasha's mission and siege of Belgrade, Aganlija and the three others fled down the Danube for Poreč and then the Ada Kale island. Milenko Stojković and his 30 men captured them and had them beheaded, on the order of Bekir Pasha and the help of the island commander Ibrahim Pasha.

=== Mula Jusuf ===
Mula Jusuf (Serbian Cyrillic: Мула Јусуф) was the governor of the Kragujevac nahiya. After the murder of Hadji Mustafa Pasha in 1801, a Janissary named Tosun-aga arrived in Jagodina from Vidin and demanded that he too receive a portion of the Pashalik. Mula Jusuf opposed to this and was reinforced with troops sent by Mehmed-aga Fočić, among these troops were Turks and Serbs (such as Gaja Pantelić). Tosun-aga was defeated by Mula Jusuf, and was subsequently employed by the Dahije as a top commander. Mula Jusuf led skirmishes around Belgrade in 1804.

=== Kabadahije ===
The Dahije's best and most loyal Janissaries, outside the quartet, were known as kabadahije (sing. kabadahija, Turkish: kabadayi), and these were appointed mütesellim (mayors) of cities and towns. In each village, they appointed subaşı. The Dahije also employed deli (light cavalry) and kırcalı (bandit mercenary), and had support from portions or all soldiers in each city and town. The notorious Janissary henchmen on the countryside, often based in roadside and village inns, were known as handžije (sing. handžija).

- Sali-Aga (Serbian: Сали-ага Ђеврлић; fl. 1801–04), kabadahija, brother of Kučuk-Alija, Dahije mütesellim of Rudnik nahiya. Infamous for his evilness and oppression of Serbs and especially women; families were torn apart due to his transgressions, due to which he was called "the Rudnik bull". He murdered Gavrilo Buđevac during the "Slaughter of the Knezes". Survived the pursuit following the siege of Rudnik (4–6 March), and managed to Čačak with 200–300 men. Fled the attack on Čačak (5 April 1805).
- Mus-aga Fočić (fl. 1801–04), kabadahija, brother of Mehmed-aga, at the beginning of 1804 the commander of the nahiya of Šabac and Valjevo.
- Alil-aga Džavić (Serbian: Алил-ага Џавић; fl. 1804), kabadahija, Dahije mütesellim (mayor) of Užice, fell at Rudnik in early March 1804.
- Pljakić (Serbian: Хаџи-баша Пљакић; fl. 1804) or Pljaka (Пљака), kabadahija, Dahije mütesellim (mayor) of Karanovac, fell at Rudnik in early March 1804.
- Čolak-Alija (fl. 1804), kabadahija, Dahije mütesellim (mayor) of Čačak, defeated at Rudnik in early March 1804.
- Poreč-Alija (Serbian: Пореч-Алија; fl. 1804), kabadahija, Dahije mütesellim (mayor) of Valjevo. An Arnaut, former member of Pazvanoglu's army in the 1790s. Succeeded Asan-aga as mayor of Valjevo. Infamous as an evildoer. Guested Mehmed-aga Fočić when he captured Aleksa Nenadović, Ilija Birčanin and Milovan Grbović in January 1804. He escaped Valjevo when it was attacked in March 1804. He was defeated in battle at Dživdžibare by Petar Dobrnjac and Paulj Matejić in 1806. Survived the destruction of the Dahije and based himself at Poreč, from where he was pushed out in 1807 by Milenko Stojković, then lived at Adakale.
- Kara-Mustafa (Serbian: Кара-Мустафа; fl. 1804), kabadahija, Dahije mütesellim (mayor) of Kragujevac, later became Vizier Sulejman Pasha Skopljak's kapi-binbaşı and participated in the Second Serbian Uprising.
- Kučuk-Sali-aga Arslanović (Serbian: Кучук-Сали-ага; fl. 1801–04), kabadahija, Dahije mütesellim (mayor) of Požarevac, commander during the 1804 siege.
- Abd-aga, Dahije mütesellim (mayor) of Jagodina, appointed by Kučuk-Alija in place of Mahmud-aga.
- Tosun-aga (fl. 1801–04), Janissary commander. Led a Janissary detachment from the Sanjak of Vidin that took over Ćuprija in 1800. He tried to rule Jagodina as an equal to the quartet but failed. He was sent with 500 cavalry by Kučuk-Alija to Batočina to lift a siege, survived Kijevo assault in late March 1804.
- Ibrahim-aga (fl. 1804), brother of Mula-Jusuf, fell in skirmish near Ćirikovac against Milenko Stojković.
- Omer-aga (fl. 1804), active in Požarevac nahiya.
- Mula Nožina or Nožin-aga (Serbian: Мула Ножина, Ножин-ага fl. 1804), kabadahija, active in Šabac, originally kırcalı (bandit mercenary) from Bosnia, born in Maoča. Participated at Čokešina (1804).
- Uzun-Mehmed (Serbian: Узун-Мехмед, Узун-Мемед, Узун-Кавеџија), kabadahija, Janissary commander and coffehouse owner (kafedžija), and Kara-Husein (Кара-Усеин), sent with 12 men by Mehmed-aga Fočić to kill Karađorđe in Topola, failed, all were assailants were killed.
- Bego Novljanin (Serbian: Новљанин-бег), kabadahija from Bosanski Novi, Bosnia. Moved to Šabac in the early 1790s despite restrictions, where he and Ćurt-oglija (Ћуртоглија, Ћурт-оглија), kabadahija, from Zvornik were known as evildoers. Ottoman commander in Šabac during the tenure of Hadji Mustafa Pasha. Novljanin and Ćurt-oglija murdered knez Ranko Lazarević in 1800, upon which knez Aleksa Nenadović protested to Mustafa Pasha who had Novljanin pursued by 600 soldiers, who caught and executed 36 of his men, while Novljanin fled to Bosnia. Returned to the Belgrade Pashalik after the murder of Mustafa Pasha. The duo not only murdered and robbed Serbs, but also Muslims who they blamed for the expulsion of Janissaries from the Pashalik. Novljanin surrendered at Užice (1 August 1805) and was allowed to leave for Bosnia. Ćurt-oglija was killed alongside Musaga Fočić in Zvornik, in 1805 by Mehmed-paša Vidajić after he was tricked into doing so, and their heads were sent to Travnik.
- Osman-aga Fočić, Janissary agha. Brother or cousin of Mehmed-aga and Mus-aga. He surrendered at Užice (1 August 1805) and was allowed to leave for Bosnia.
- Omer-aga Nišlija, Janissary agha. From Niš. Sent to Užice by Hafiz Agha of Niš, or moved from Bosnia to Užice during the Dahije reign with Bego Novljanin. Stayed at Užice with Janissaries from the Sanjak of Vidin. He surrendered at Užice (1 August 1805) and was allowed to leave for Bosnia.
- Foča-oglu-aga (Serbian: Фоча-оглу-ага), Fočo Efendija (Фочо Ефендија), or simply Foča, the father of Dahije leader Mehmed-aga and kabadahija Mus-aga, advisor to the Dahije. From the Sanjak of Herzegovina. He served as the kadi (Muslim judge) official in Loznica prior to the Dahije takeover of Belgrade in 1801. According to the Zemun Memoirs, he advised the murder of Vizier Hadji Mustafa Pasha. He argued against the Dahije's continued oppression against the Serbs following outbreak of rebellion.

=== Kırcalı ===
- Alija Gušanac (Serbian: Гушанац-Алија, "Alija from Gusinje"), kırcalı (bandit mercenary) from Gusinje, hence his byname. He was ranked binbaşı and joined Kučuk-Alija in Jagodina with 800–900 mercenaries (made up of mostly Turks and Albanians, but also some Christians). When the Dahije leaders escaped Belgrade, Gušanac took control of Belgrade.
- Husein Ganić, kırcalı (bandit mercenary) from İpek nahiya, commander of 250 Arnauts in Kučuk-Alija's service, fell at Kijevo in late March 1804.

=== Bosnian allies ===
- Osman Pazvantoğlu, Vizier of the Sanjak of Vidin, long-time Janissary supporter.
- Ali Pasha Vidajić, bey in the Sanjak of Zvornik, Mehmed's nephew.
- Mehmed-kapetan Vidajić, bey in the Sanjak of Zvornik, Ali's uncle.

== Legacy ==
There are many Serbian epic poems regarding the Dahije, such as Početak bune protiv dahija ("Beginning of the Revolt against the Dahije"), performed by blind bard Filip Višnjić (1767–1834) and collected by philologist Vuk Karadžić (1787–1864).

The first feature film in Serbia and the Balkans, The Life and Deeds of the Immortal Leader Karađorđe (1911), included the Dahije, with Sava Todorović playing several of them. The Dahije and beginning of the uprising are depicted in the Serbian TV comedy series Crni Gruja (2003–2007), with Nikola Pejaković playing Aganlija.

== See also ==
- Ottoman coups of 1807–08

== Annotations ==
1. The renegade janissary leaders were called dahije, from Ottoman Turkish dayı, meaning "uncle". The lesser janissary commanders were called kabadahije (s. kabadahija), referring to the Turkish phrase "kabadayı", since becoming a colloquial Serbo-Croatian phrase for bullies.
2. Also spellt Fočali, Фочали, Fočo-oglu, Фочо-оглу. His brother's name is spellt Musaga, Mus-aga or Musa-aga.

== Sources ==
- Batalaka, Lazar Arsenijević (1898). Историја српског устанка: део први [History of the Serbian Uprising: Part One]. Vol. I. Izd. Batalakinoga fonda – via Google Books.
- Bodrožić, Đuro (2019). "Nacionalna država u Prvom srpskom ustanku". Politička revija. 62 (4): 87–107.
- Đurić, Janićije; Samardžić, Dragana (1980). Kazivanja o Srpskom ustanku 1804. Srpska književna zadruga.
- Gavrilović, Andra (1904). "Сеча кнезова". Црте из историје ослобођења Србије. Belgrade: Издање дворске књижаре Мите Стајића у Београду. pp. 7–42 – via Archive.org.
- Janković, Dragoslav (1983). "ПРЕДИСТОРИЈА СТВАРАЊА СРПСКЕ ДРЖАВЕ ПРВОГ УСТАНКА". Анали Правног факултета у Београду. 31 (1–4). Правни факултет Универзитета у Београду: 371–385 – via CEEOL.
- Jovanović, Dobrivoje (2014) [2009]. "ПРВЕ БОРБЕ СА ТУРЦИМА И ОСЛОБОЂЕЊЕ ЈАГОДИНЕ 1804.ГОДИНЕ" (PDF). Прошлост. 3. Историјски архив Јагодина.
- Jovanović, Dragoljub K. (1883). "Црна река" [Crna Reka]. Glasnik Srpskog učenog društva. 54: 187–256 – via Google Books.
- Jovanović, Vladimir M. (2017). "Видин и Србија почетком 19. века". Историјски часопис. 66: 293–319 – via CEEOL.
- Ljubojević, Ratko Lj.; Radović-Stojanović, Jelena V. (2022). "Терор османских власти над српским народом". Тематски зборник „СТРАХ У НАУЧНОМ И УМЕТНИЧКОМ СТВАРАЛАШТВУ“. Лепосавић: Институт за српску културу Приштина: 495–510. ISBN 978-86-89025-80-4.
- Nedeljković, Slaviša D.; Đorđević, Miloš Z. (2015). "Политичке прилике у београдском пашалуку у предвечерје српске револуције (1787-1804)". Teme. XXXIX (3). Niš: 965–969.
- Nedeljković, Slaviša D.; Đorđević, Miloš Z.; Popović, Aleksa M. (2022). "ИСТОЧНО ПИТАЊЕ И ФАКТОРИ ИНТЕГРАЦИЈЕ СРПСКОГ НАРОДА У ПЕРИОДУ ОД 1774. ДО 1807. ГОДИНЕ". Лесковачки зборник. 62: 73–90.
- Nenadović, Matija (1893). Kovačević, Ljubomir (ed.). Мемоари Матије Ненадовића [Memoirs of Matija Nenadović]. Srpska književna zadruga – via Archive.org.
- Nenadović, Konstantin N. (1884). Живот и дела великог Ђорђа Петровића Кара-Ђорђа [Life and Deeds of Great Đorđe Petrović Kara-Đorđe]. Vol. II (1 ed.). Vienna: У Штампарији Јована Н. Вернаја – via Google Books.
- Nenadović, Konstantin N. (1903) [1883]. Живот и дела великог Ђорђа Петровића Кара-Ђорђа [Life and Deeds of Great Đorđe Petrović Kara-Đorđe]. Vol. I (2 ed.). Belgrade: Штампа Савића и Комп. – via Archive.org.
- Novaković, Stojan (1904). Устанак на дахије 1804 [Uprising against the Dahije]. Штампано у Државној штампарији – via Archive.org.
- Novaković, Stojan (1906). Tursko carstvo pred srpski ustanak, 1780–1804. Beograd Davidović – via Archive.org.
- Pantelić, Dušan (1949). Београдски пашалук пред Први српски устанак: 1794-1804. Belgrade: Научна књига.
- Perović, Dušan (1976). "Osnovni ciljevi prvog ustanka". Историјски часопис. 23. Istorijski institut: 51-.
- Protić, Kosta (1893). "Ратни догађаји из првога српског устанка под Карађорђем Петровићем 1804—1813". Годишњица Николе Чупића. XIII. Državna štamparija.
- Šabanović, Hazim (1956). Турски извори о српској револуцији, 1804 [Turkish sources on the Serbian Revolution, 1804]. Istorisko društvo Narodne Republike Srbije. pp. 244–245, 295, 314.
- Stojančević, Vladimir (1957). "Борбе за ослобођење Београда 1804–1806 године" (PDF). ГОДИШЊАК. IV. Музеј града Београда: 111–142.
- Vukićević, Milenko M. (1907). Карађорђе (1752–1804) [Karađorđe]. Vol. 1. Државна штампарија Краљевине Србије – via Archive.org.
- Živojinović, Dragoljub R. (2004). "Прилике у Београдском пашалуку и почетак Првог српског устанка 1790-1804. године". Братство. 8: 9–16. ISSN 1451-2386.
