= Momir of Lučica =

Momir of Lučica (Serbian Cyrillic: Момир из Лучице; fl. 1804–13) was a Serbian Revolutionary commander who participated in the First Serbian Uprising (1804–13).

He was born in Lučica, at that time part of the Požarevac nahiya in the Sanjak of Smederevo ("Belgrade Pashaluk").

He was a knez before the uprising. He joined the uprising at the beginning, in 1804, and rallied people in the Morava and Stig regions. He participated in the Siege of Požarevac (1804), besieging the town from Morava to Salakovac. His trench was situated in Gornja Mala. Momir and Milenko Stojković cleansed the southern part of the Požarevac district from Ottoman forces. After the liberation of Požarevac, Karađorđe appointed him the knez of Morava (Moravska knežina).

Paulj Matejić begged for the hand of Momir's daughter for his son Budimir, and they married.

Momir had a mansion in Lučica, fenced by palisade.

His son Ivo Momirović (fl. 1812–13) was a vojvoda.

Momir is regarded the third, after Milenko Stojković and Petar Dobrnjac, most important revolutionary in the First Serbian Uprising from the Požarevac area, based on courage, reputation and participation.

== See also ==
- List of Serbian Revolutionaries

== Sources ==
- Janićije Đurić; Dragana Samardžić (1980). Kazivanja o Srpskom ustanku 1804. Srpska književna zadruga. pp. 38, 235, 257, 258.
- Milićević, Milan (1888). Поменик знаменитих људи у српскога народа новијега доба. Srpska kraljevska štamparija. p. 392. ( Public domain)
- Manojlović, Miroljub (2005). Пожаревац од турске касабе до српске вароши: 1804-1858. Народни музеј. pp. 22, 24, 25, 27, 91. ISBN 978-86-84147-05-1.
- Novaković, Stojan (1954). Ustanak na dahije 1804: ocena izvora, karakter ustanka, volevanje 1804. Srpska književna zadruga. pp. 109, 155, 210.
- Perović, Radoslav (1954). Прилози за историју првог српског устанка: необјављена грађа. Народна књ. p. 102.
