= Meetings at Drlupa and Palanka =

Events in the First Serbian Uprising

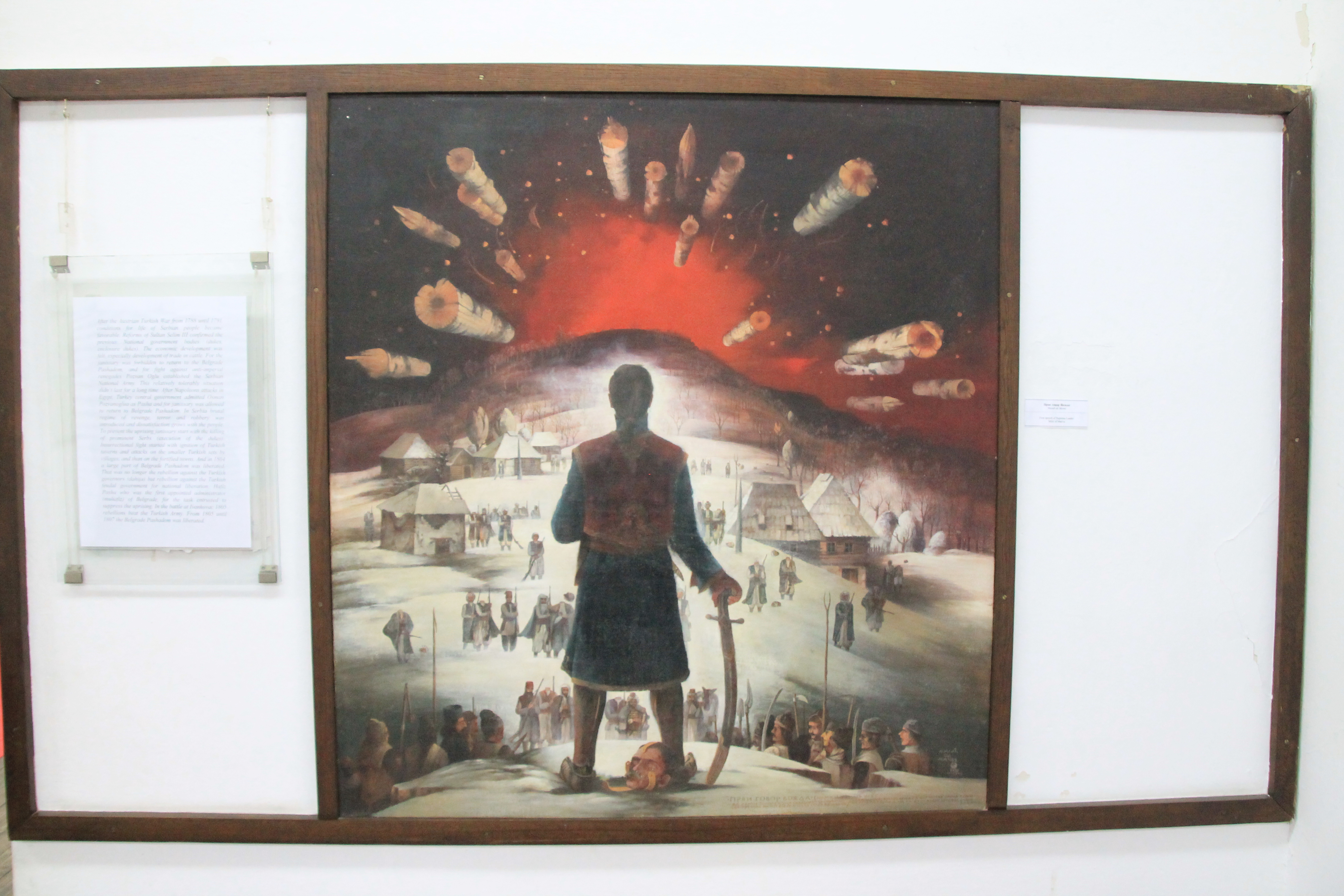
- Painting depicting Karađorđe at Drlupa.
- Date: Second half of February 1804
- Location: Drlupa and Smederevska Palanka, Ottoman Empire (now Serbia)
- Type: Peace talks
- Cause: Burning of the Inns (First Serbian Uprising)
- Organised by: Dahije
- Participants: Karađorđe (Serbian rebels); Aganlija (Dahije)
- Outcome: Failed

The First Serbian Uprising broke out in February 1804 following the Slaughter of the Knezes conducted by the Dahije (renegade Janissaries) that had wrested the Belgrade Pashalik and ruled in tyranny. After the Burning of the Inns, the Dahije sent one of their leaders to negotiate with the rebels under supreme commander Karađorđe. They met in Drlupa, where the meeting became a battle, and then tried negotiating again at Smederevska Palanka. The negotiations failed and the uprising continued to expand.

== Background ==
After the Orašac Assembly held on 14 February 1804, Karađorđe's rebels went to Šumadija villages where they burnt down the Turk inns, killed the Dahije followers (handžije) and collected men. The Dahije sent monk Mata, the protosynkellos of Metropolitan Leontios Lambros, with four elder Belgrader Turks to Topola to get Karađorđe to stop the uprising through promising a huge sum of money. Karađorđe declined, saying that the Serbs would no longer endure Turk inns, Janissaries and their henchmen, nor their disgrace and evil, and that only a warranty with the Habsburg emperor would be accepted. Karađorđe threatened Kučuk-Alija, the worst of the Dahije, and exchanged 19 Turks for his imprisoned friend Mladen Milovanović. The Dahije sent Aganlija to negotiate peace with Karađorđe.

== Meeting at Drlupa ==
The Dahije chose the Kolubara knežina, which was not yet caught up in rebellion, as the meeting place between Aganlija and Karađorđe. Apart from 60 Janissaries and 200 Turks collected on the way, the Dahije suggested that Aganlija also gather armed Serbs in Kolubara with whom he would partake in the negotiation. Aganlija was the chiflik-holder of the villages Konatice, Vranić and Drlupa. Apart from the concessions from the previous meeting at Topola, the Dahije wanted to bribe Karađorđe with 200,000 groschen for him to stop the uprising.

Aganlija arrived with 200 men of Kolubara (Batalaka claimed 500–600) at Drlupa. Karađorđe wanted to have the meeting at Ranilović instead, but Aganlija insisted on Drlupa. With 200 chosen men, Karađorđe arrived at Rogača. It is believed the Dahije wanted to bribe Karađorđe to stop the uprising and then to continue their tyranny and murders. Karađorđe was untrusting and wanted to destroy Aganlija and his followers, and thus sent some men to Drlupa to inform the Kolubara men of his intent and have them join in the attack, at the same time telling Aganlija that the meeting would be held the next day at rifle-distance with a smaller number of participants. The Kolubara men under knez Aksentije declined, as he didn't believe that the uprising would succeed.

The next day, a meeting was held either on the road between Rogača and Drlupa, according to Gavrilo Kovačević at Sibnica below the Kosmaj (a village next to Drlupa), or at Drlupa itself. Batalaka and Janićije Đurić dated the meeting at Drlupa to 24 February [O.S. 12 February] 1804, while S. Novaković concluded that the meeting at Drlupa took place within 16–18 February, using all available sources. Karađorđe's entourage was made up of prominent people and the most prominent commanders, numbering ten momci ("lads") according to K. Protić, while Aganlija's entourage was made up of twenty or twenty-something chosen Turk elders, while the troops of both sides were behind them at half a rifle distance. Among notables in Karađorđe's entourage were Janićije Đurić and Stanoje Glavaš. Aganlija promised the previous concessions and that the Dahije would stop all zulum ("injustice"), close down the Turk inns in Serb villages, remove the subaşi and chiflik, and also proclaim and recognize Karađorđe the obor-knez of all of the Belgrade Pashalik. The Dahije wouldn't interfere in Serb affairs and give all the collection of taxes, haraç, tobacco, and all other dation meant for the empire, to Karađorđe and his knezes, to hand over to the Dahije, and in return Karađorđe would receive 200 bags of yearly payment (ajluk). Karađorđe was to have no involvement in the Dahije handling of the collection meant for the empire. The Dahije was to negotiate with the emperor, and the rayah (commoners) would then either give the collection to the Belgrade Pasha or the Dahije. According to some, Aganlija proposed a retirement in Austria to Karađorđe.

Karađorđe demanded a warranty of the points to be concluded with any state, which Aganlija declined, as the Dahije had no diplomacy. At this moment, according to several testimonies, a Turk musket went off, and the Serb delegation thought Karađorđe was targeted. The shot came from the village or from among the entourage, depending on testimony. The Serbs proceeded to shoot at Aganlija, wounded him in the foot, wounded several more, and killed his associate, an Arab Janissary. The Turks killed Jovan Đaurović from Baroševac and Panta from Kragujevac, and wounded Stanoje Glavaš in the head. Karađorđe ordered his men to stand down, exchanged a few words with the wounded Aganlija, and decided to continue negotiations the next day. The two sides retreated to Drlupa and Rogača. There are different versions on the events; another theory is that there was first a negotiation in day-time and then a battle in the evening. The Turks had 36 dead men and 15 dead horses, and 14 wounded, according to a report which describes the event as a Serb attack and makes no mention of a negotiation, by Zemun archpriest Mihailo Pejić to Metropolitan Stefan Stratimirović.

Aganlija, wounded, and according to Batalaka, informed on Karađorđe's real intentions from a Kolubara man, did not wait for dawn and returned to Belgrade. The Serbs learnt of his pain and return to Belgrade in the morning. Aganlija returned humiliated to Belgrade, which greatly excited the rayah, from which the rebels drew more volunteers, surprising the Ottomans who sought to suppress the uprising. At Belgrade, the Dahije accused Aganlija for failing the negotiation due to lack of skills, and didn't believe that Karađorđe intended to attack them. Fearing Serb escalation and the threat from the empire, the Dahije decided for a third delegation to Karađorđe.

== Meeting at Palanka ==
The Dahije chose 20 of their best Janissaries and Metropolitan Leontios Lambros, who succeeded as metropolitan upon the Dahije murder of Methodios, to negotiate with Karađorđe at Hasan-pašina Palanka (now Smederevska Palanka). According to K. Protić the Dahije sent ten-something elder Turk yerli ("natives") with Leontios. They again sent monk Mata to inform Karađorđe of this, and he ensured their safe passage there. Karađorđe moved from Ratari and arrived at Palanka with the Dahije delegation already there. Batalaka dated the Palanka meeting to after 28 February [O.S. 16 February] 1804, however, S. Novaković placed it 7–8 days after Drlupa, that is, in the period of 24–27 February; V. Stojančević dated the Palanka meeting to 5 March 1804. Karađorđe had forty men with him, while the rest of his army was near Palanka. The Dahije promised the past concessions, with the addition of the Dahije calling upon the metropolitan's trust in them. Karađorđe had a clear goal, and reiterated that the Serbs wouldn't lay down their weapons unless the Dahije came with a warranty with any of the foreign powers (or Porte) as guarantor. The negotiation once again failed. Leontios feared that he would be blamed for the failure and sent monk Mata to Karađorđe asking him to take Leontios under his protection. Karađorđe declined.

== Aftermath and legacy ==
After Drlupa, the rebels went throughout Šumadija, and Karađorđe established firm cooperation with the rebels commanders in the nahiyas of Belgrade. During the meeting at Drlupa, the Smederevo nahiya Serb notables gathered at Selevac where they elected Đuša Vulićević their leader.

Karađorđe was informed by Milan Obrenović, Petar Kara, Lazar Mutap and Arsenije Loma, who set up ambuscades around Rudnik, that the Dahije leader Sali-aga received reinforcements of 500 Turk cavalry from various places and that this posed a problem. As more troops gathered around Karađorđe, he set out for Rudnik to liberate the area from the Dahije. Next, Rudnik was attacked, held by the infamous Dahije Sali-aga, the brother of Kučuk-Alija.

The fight at Drlupa is counted as the first armed conflict of the uprising.

== See also ==
- Timeline of the Serbian Revolution

== Annotations ==
1. The events are known as the "second delegation" (druga deputacija), "meeting" (sastanak) and "battle of Drlupa" (bitka kod Drlupe); "meeting at Palanka" (sastanak u Palanci), "third delegation" (treća deputacija).

== Sources ==
- Batalaka, Lazar Arsenijević (1898). Историја српског устанка. Vol. I. Izd. Batalakinoga fonda.
- Đorđević, Miroslav R. (1967). Ослободилачки рат српских устанака, 1804–1806. Војноиздавачки завод. ISBN 9788633501545.
- Đurić, Janićije; Samardžić, Dragana (1980). Kazivanja o Srpskom ustanku 1804. Srpska književna zadruga.
- Milićević, Milan Đ. (1888). Поменик знаменитих људи у српског народа новијега доба. Издање Чупићеве задужбине – via Archive.org.
- Nenadović, Konstantin N. (1903) [1883]. Живот и дела великог Ђорђа Петровића Кара-Ђорђа. Vol. I (2 ed.). Belgrade: Штампа Савића и Комп. – via Archive.org.
- Nenadović, Konstantin N. (1884). Живот и дела великог Ђорђа Петровића Кара-Ђорђа. Vol. II (1 ed.). Vienna: У Штампарији Јована Н. Вернаја – via Google Books.
- Novaković, Stojan (1904). Устанак на дахије 1804. Штампано у Државној штампарији – via Archive.org.
- Protić, Kosta (1893). "Ратни догађаји из првога српског устанка под Карађорђем Петровићем 1804—1813". Годишњица Николе Чупића. XIII. Državna štamparija.
- Stojančević, Vladimir (1957). "Борбе за ослобођење Београда 1804–1806 године" (PDF). ГОДИШЊАК. IV. Музеј града Београда: 111–142.
- Vukićević, Milenko M. (1912). Karađorđe: Istorija ustanka od 1804–1807. Štampano u Državnoj štampariji Kraljevine Srbije.
- Zlatković, Branko (2010). "Дахија Аганлија у традицијском памћењу" (PDF). Фолклор – Поетика – Књижевна периодика: зборник радова посвећен Миодрагу Матицком. Београд: Институт за књижевност и уметност: 345–368.
