= Israel Behor Haim =

Israel Behor Haim (Hebrew: ישראל בכ״ר חיים) was a Serbian Jewish author and translator.

== Biography ==
Israel Behor Haim was born in Belgrade, Serbia, the eldest son of Haim de David. In 1813, he left his homeland due to the invasion of the Dahjas and relocated to Vienna. There he undertook the task of editing Ladino translations of the Bible, daily prayers, other ritual works, and school textbooks.

Around 1838, Haim returned to Belgrade and dedicated himself to the realm of Jewish literature, especially in Ladino. Regrettably, a many of his stories and poems were lost in 1866.

== Selected publications ==
- Ḥokhmat Yehoshuaʻ ben Sira: neʻtaḳ mi-leshon ʻIvri li-leshon Sefaradi. Vienna. 1818.
- Sefer Ḥovot ha-levavot. Vienna: Ant. Schmid. 1822.
- Ḥanokh la-naʻar ʻal pi darko Maestro de Creaturas. Vienna. 1828.
- Otsar ha-ḥayim. Vienna: Ant. Schmid. 1822.
