= Maoča =

Maoča Маоча
- Village
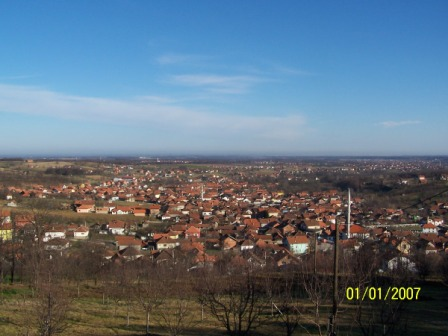

- Location within Bosnia and Herzegovina
- Coordinates: 44°46′06″N 18°39′25″E
- Country: Bosnia and Herzegovina
- Entity: Brčko District

Area
  - Total: 7.34 sq mi (19.00 km^{2})

Population (2013)
  - Total: 3,030
  - Density: 413/sq mi (159/km^{2})
- Time zone: UTC+1 (CET)
  - Summer (DST): UTC+2 (CEST)

Maoča (Serbian Cyrillic: Маоча) is a village in the municipality of Brčko, Bosnia and Herzegovina.

== Demographics ==
According to the 2013 census, its population was 3,030.

Ethnicity in 2013
Ethnicity	Number	Percentage
Bosniaks	2,999	99.0%
Croats	4	0.1%
other/undeclared	27	0.9%
Total	3,030	100%
