= Ostoja Spuž =

Vojvoda Ostoja Spuž-Spužić (c. 1765—1814) was a Serbian voivode in Karađorđe's Serbia during the Serbian Revolution of 1804.

The prince and duke of Mačva, Ostoja Spuž, moved from Spuž (Montenegro) to Serbia and settled in Šabac. According to the family tradition of Ostoja Spuž, when he came to Serbia from Spuž from today's Montenegro, he brought a lot of weapons, rifles, and sabers. Before the First Serbian Uprising, he had a band of hajduks, then he was the first elder of Šabac, before Duke Luka Lazarević. was appointed commander of Šabac.

Duke Ostoja Spuž, was later a member of the magistrate in Šabac, in the court title of a prince, a knyaz.

Ostoja Spuž(ić) took part in the battles around Šabac, in the siege of Belgrade and in the conquest and liberation of Požarevac. During the first capture of Šabac, he settled with his family in the town of Šabac, actually, the Šabac Fortress in 1804, according to the Matija Nenadović's Memoari (Memoirs).

Ostoja Spužić died on the eve of the Second Serbian Uprising.

His war trophies, sabers, holsters, and rifles were preserved with his son Jovan Spužić.

Around 1800, when he was thirty, Ostoja Spuž married Vasilija Urošević from the village of Grušić. Ostoja and Vasilija Spužić had two sons, Jovan and Đorđe, and two daughters, Milica and Andjelija

Slobodan Jovanović's grandfather was Ostoja Spuž.
