= The Beginning of the Revolt against the Dahijas =

Serbian epic poem

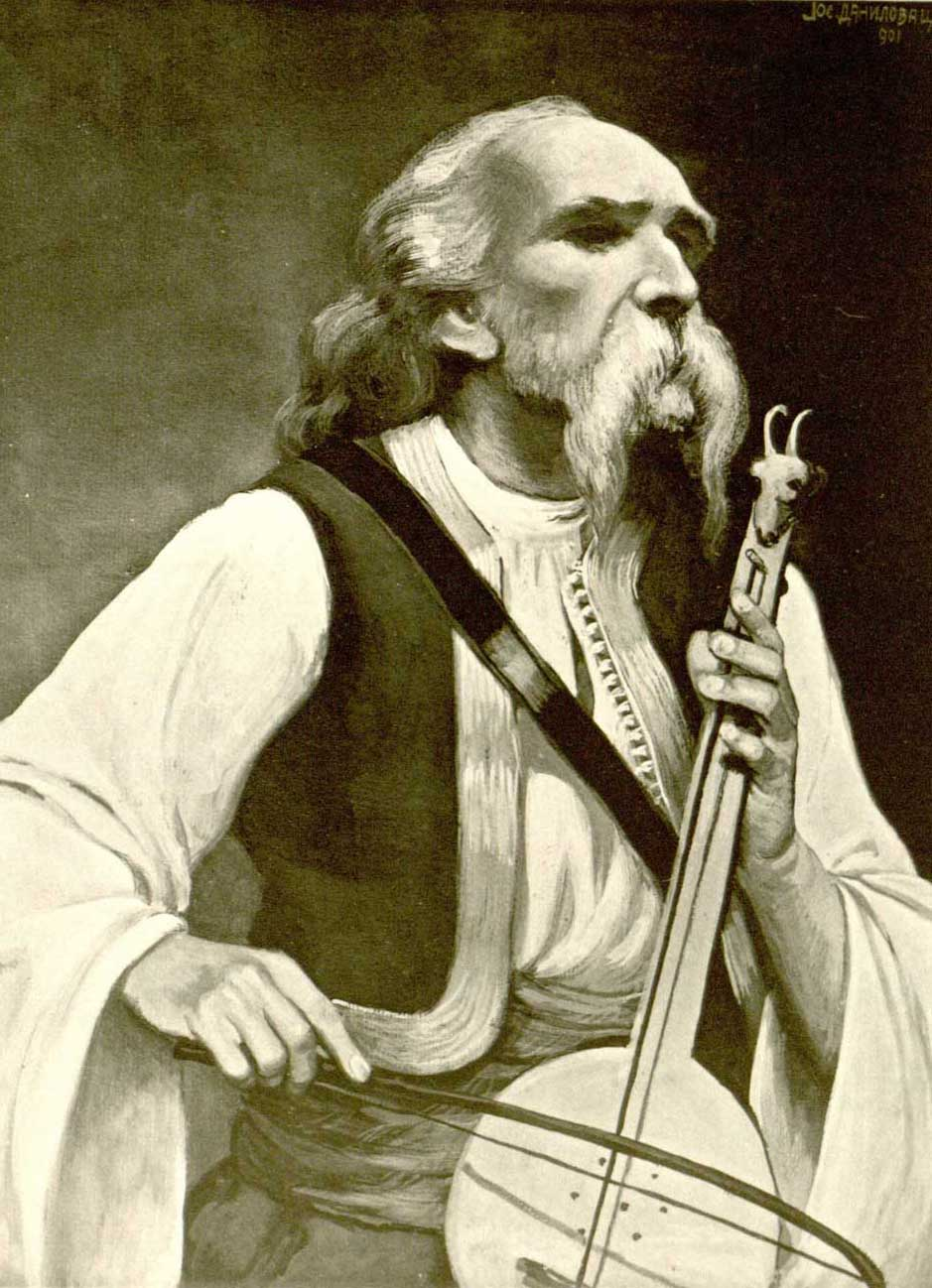
Filip Višnjić, the author of the poem.

The Beginning of the Revolt against the Dahijas (Serbian: Почетак буне против дахија/Početak bune protiv dahija), a Serbian epic poem, is one of the best known poems about the liberation of Serbia. It was recited by Filip Višnjić, a blind gusle player. Linguist Vuk Karadžić heard it from Višnjić and wrote it down in 1815 while he was in Šišatovac monastery.

== Summary ==
The poem recounts chronologically the events that led to the Uprising against the Dahije and the First Serbian Uprising in 1804.

In the opening part of the poem, the poet sends an artistic message about the imminent rebellion by describing rare natural events. Solar eclipse, comets and lunar eclipse are all signs which indicate the start of the rebellion against Turks, and it is the ordinary people who will start the uprising.

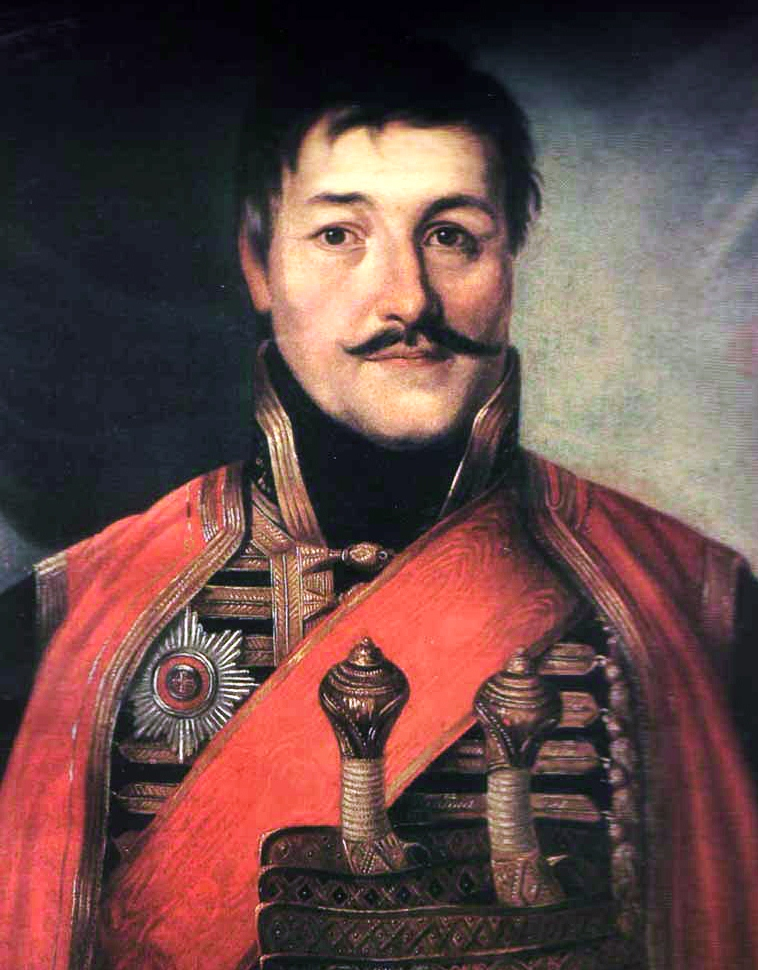
Karađorđe Petrović

Meanwhile, Turks are also watching these occurrences. For Serbian people, the signs mean they should fight the Turks, and for Dahiyas, Turkish leaders, they are bad omens that need to be interpreted. Dahiyas use traditional divination methods: hydromancy and interpreting holy prophet books. All signs indicate the downfall of the Turks. Dahiyas were cruel to the Serbian people and thereby they offended their fallen Sultan’s legacy.

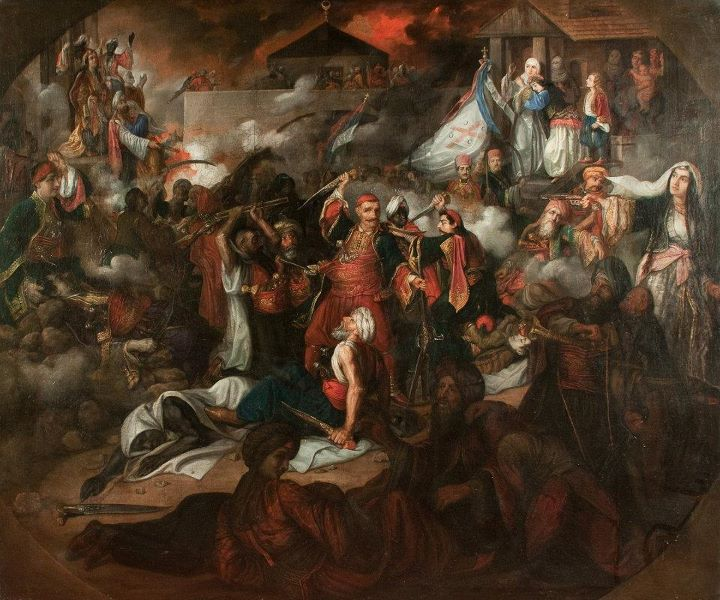
Liberation of Belgrade

The sin is as great as the punishment that will befall them. They didn’t listen to Sultan Murad on his deathbed nor to the wise old man Fočo (one of the seven Dahiyas). Anxiety and fear become obvious in an argument between father and son – the old man Fočo and Fočić Mehmed aga. That argument represents the conflict of wisdom and hotheadedness.

The Slaughter of the Knezes will ensue after the young Fočić arrogantly rejects his father’s advice. The Serbs are infuriated when Turks come to Topola to execute Karađorđe (the leader of the First Serbian Uprising). Filip Višnjić gives the role of the hero to the people and Karađorđe’s victorious speech by the Drina river marks the final revenge of the oppressed.
