= Serbian Revolution =

Revolution of Serbia against the Ottomans

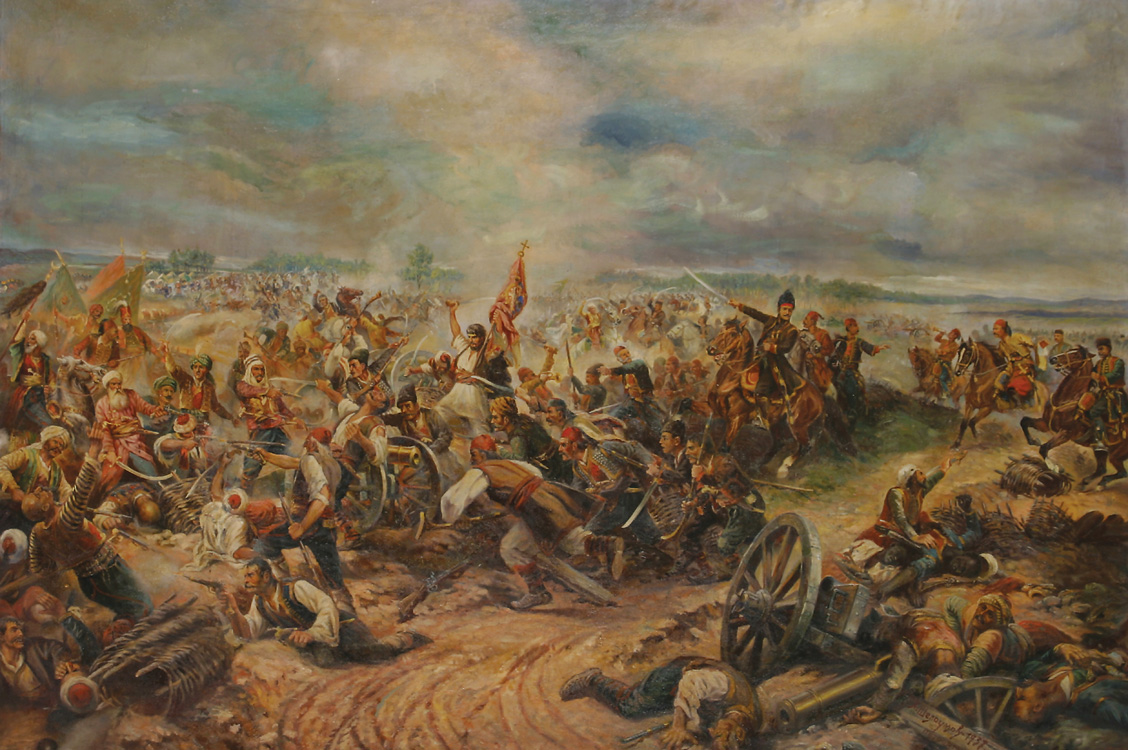
- Battle of Mišar (1806), painting by Afanasij Šeloumov
Date	First Serbian Uprising: 14 February 1804 – 7 October 1813 (9 years, 7 months, 3 weeks and 2 days); Hadži-Prodan's rebellion: 27 September – 30 December 1814 (3 months and 3 days); Second Serbian Uprising: 23 April 1815 – 26 July 1817 (2 years, 3 months and 2 days)
Location	The Balkans (Central Serbia and partially Bosnia)
Result	First Serbian Uprising: Ottoman victory; Abolishment of Serbian rebel government; Hadži-Prodan's rebellion: Ottoman victory; Second Serbian Uprising: Serbian victory; Establishment of the autonomous Principality of Serbia
Territorial changes	The Ottoman Empire loses direct control of the Sanjak of Smederevo

Belligerents
First Serbian Uprising (1804–1813); Revolutionary Serbia; Supported by: Russian Empire (1807–12) Wallachia	First Serbian Uprising (1804–1813); Dahijas (1804) Ottoman Empire (from 1805): Bosnia Eyalet; Pashalik of Scutari; Pashalik of Yanina; Supported by: France
Hadži-Prodan's rebellion (1814) (Revolutionary Serbia) Serbian rebels	Hadži-Prodan's rebellion (1814); Ottoman Empire
Second Serbian Uprising (1815–1817); Serbian rebels Wallachia	Second Serbian Uprising (1815–1817); Ottoman Empire: Bosnia Eyalet; Pashalik of Scutari; Pashalik of Yanina

Commanders and leaders
First Serbian Uprising (1804–1813); (Revolutionary Serbia) Karađorđe; (Revolutionary Serbia) Matija Nenadović; (Revolutionary Serbia) Jakov Nenadović; (Revolutionary Serbia) Mladen Milovanović; (Revolutionary Serbia) Milenko Stojković; (Revolutionary Serbia) Stanoje Glavaš; (Revolutionary Serbia) Vasa Čarapić †; (Revolutionary Serbia) Hajduk-Veljko †; (Revolutionary Serbia) Miloš Obrenović (WIA); (Revolutionary Serbia) Petar Dobrnjac; (Revolutionary Serbia) Tomo Milinović; (Revolutionary Serbia) Zeka Buljubaša †; Hadži-Prodan's rebellion (1814); (Revolutionary Serbia) Hadži-Prodan; (Revolutionary Serbia) Stanoje Glavaš (executed); Second Serbian Uprising (1815–1817); Miloš Obrenović; Jovan Obrenović; Milić Drinčić †; Jovan Dimitrijević Dobrača; Petar Nikolajević Moler; Stojan Čupić †; Sima Nenadović †; Sima Katić; Toma Vučić Perišić; Tanasko Rajić †	First Serbian Uprising (1804–1813); Mehmed-aga Fočić †; Aganlija †; Kučuk-Alija †; Mula Jusuf †; (Ottoman Empire) Selim III (Sultan; until 1807); (Ottoman Empire) Mustafa IV (Sultan; 1807–08); (Ottoman Empire) Mahmud II (Sultan; from 1808); (Ottoman Empire) Sulejman-paša Skopljak; (Ottoman Empire) Hurshid Pasha; (Ottoman Empire) Receb Ağa; (Bosnia Eyalet) Bekir Pasha; (Bosnia Eyalet) Sinan-paša Sijerčić †; (Bosnia Eyalet) Osman Gradaščević †; (Bosnia Eyalet) Mehmed-beg Kulenović †; Ibrahim Bushati; Muhtar Pasha; Veli Pasha; Hadži-Prodan's rebellion (1814); (Ottoman Empire) Mahmud II (Sultan); (Ottoman Empire) Sulejman-paša Skopljak; Second Serbian Uprising (1815–1817); (Ottoman Empire) Mahmud II (Sultan); (Ottoman Empire) Maraşlı Ali Pasha; (Ottoman Empire) Sulejman-paša Skopljak; (Ottoman Empire) Hurshid Pasha; (Ottoman Empire) Ibrahim-Pasa; (Ottoman Empire) Osman-beg †; (Ottoman Empire) Seuchesmu; (Ottoman Empire) Caja-Imšir †; (Ottoman Empire) Kara-Mustafa †

The Serbian Revolution (Serbian: Српска револуција, romanized: Srpska revolucija) was a national uprising and constitutional change in Serbia that took place between 1804 and 1835, during which this territory evolved from an Ottoman province into a rebel territory, a constitutional monarchy, and modern Serbia.

In 1804, the Ottoman Janissary decided to execute all prominent nobles throughout Central Serbia, a move known as the Slaughter of the Knezes. The heads of the murdered Serbian nobles were put on public display in the central square to serve as an example to those who might plot against Ottoman rule. The event triggered the start of the Serbian Revolution aimed at putting an end to the 370 years of Ottoman occupation. The first part of the period, from 1804 to 1817, was marked by a violent struggle for independence from the Ottoman Empire with two armed uprisings taking place, ending with a ceasefire. The later period (1817–1835) witnessed a peaceful consolidation of political power of the increasingly autonomous Serbia, culminating in the recognition of the right to hereditary rule by Serbian princes in 1830 and 1833 and the territorial expansion of the young monarchy.

The adoption of the first written Constitution in 1835 abolished feudalism and serfdom, and made the country suzerain. The term Serbian Revolution was coined by a German academic historiographer, Leopold von Ranke, in his book Die Serbische Revolution, published in 1829. These events marked the foundation of modern Serbia.

The period is further divided as follows:

- First Serbian Uprising (1804–13), led by Karađorđe Petrović
- Hadži-Prodan's rebellion (1814)
- Second Serbian Uprising (1815–17), led by Miloš Obrenović
- Official recognition of the Serbian state (1815–1833)
- Official Serbian Constitution (1835)

The Proclamation (1809) by Karađorđe in the capital Belgrade represents the probable peak of the first phase. It called for national unity, drawing on Serbian history to demand the freedom of religion and formal, written rule of law, both of which the Ottoman Empire had failed to provide. It also called on Serbs to stop paying taxes to the Porte, deemed unfair as based on religious affiliation. Apart from dispensing with poll tax on non-Muslims (jizya), the revolutionaries also abolished all feudal obligations in 1806, only 15 years after the French Revolution, peasant and serf emancipation thus representing a major social break with the past.

The rule of Miloš Obrenović consolidated the achievements of the Uprisings, leading to the proclamation of the first constitution in the Balkans and the establishment of the first Serbian institution of higher learning still in existence, the Great Academy of Belgrade (1808). In 1830 and again in 1833, Serbia was recognized as an autonomous principality, with hereditary princes paying annual tribute to the Porte. Finally, de facto independence came in 1867, with the withdrawal of Ottoman garrisons from the principality; de jure independence was formally recognized at the Congress of Berlin in 1878.

== Background ==
New circumstances, such as the Austrian occupation of Serbia, rise of the Serbian elite across the Danube, Napoleon's conquests in the Balkans, and reforms in the Russian Empire, exposed Serbs to new ideas. They could now clearly compare how their compatriots made progress in Christian Austria, the Illyrian provinces and elsewhere, while the Ottoman Serbs were still subjects to a religion-based tax that treated them as second class citizens.

During the Austrian occupation of Serbia (1788–91), many Serbs served as soldiers and officers in Habsburg armies, where they acquired knowledge about military tactics, organization and weapons. Others were employed in administrative offices in Hungary or in the occupied zone. They began to travel in search of trade and education, and were exposed to European ideas about secular society, politics, law and philosophy, including both rationalism and Romanticism. They met with the values of the French Revolution, which would affect many Serbian merchants and educated people. There was an active Serbian community in the southern Habsburg Empire, from where ideas made their way southwards (across the Danube). Another role model was the Russian Empire, the only independent Slavic and Orthodox country, which had recently reformed itself and was now a serious menace to the Turks. The Russian experience implied hope for Serbia.

Other Serbian thinkers found strengths in the Serbian nation itself. Two top Serbian scholars were influenced by Western learning to turn their attention to Serbia's own language and literature. One was Dositej Obradović (1743), a former priest who left for Western Europe. Disappointed that his people had so little secular literature which was mainly written not in the vernacular but either in Old Church Slavonic or in newly emerging Russo-Serbian hybrid language called Slavo-Serbian, he decided to bring written language closer to vernacular Serbian language common people spoke and thus assembled grammars and dictionaries, wrote some books himself and translated others. Others followed his lead and revived tales of Serbia's medieval glory. He later became the first Minister of Education of modern Serbia (1805).

The second figure was Vuk Karadžić (1787). Vuk was less influenced by Enlightenment rationalism like Dositej Obradović and more by Romanticism, which romanticized rural and peasant communities. Vuk collected and published Serbian epic poetry, work that helped to build Serbian awareness of a common identity based in shared customs and shared history. This kind of linguistic and cultural self-awareness was a central feature of German nationalism in this period, and Serbian intellectuals now applied the same ideas to the Balkans.

In 1804, the Janissary that ruled Serbia at the time, having taken power in the Sanjak of Smederevo in defiance of the Sultan, feared that the Sultan would make use of the Serbs to oust them. To forestall this they decided to execute all prominent nobles throughout Central Serbia, a move known as the Slaughter of the Knezes. According to historical sources of the city of Valjevo, the heads of the murdered men were put on public display in the central square to serve as an example to those who might plot against the rule of the Janissaries. The event triggered the start of the Serbian Revolution with the First Serbian Uprising aimed at putting an end to the 370 years of Ottoman occupation of modern Serbia.

== First Serbian Uprising (1804–1813) ==
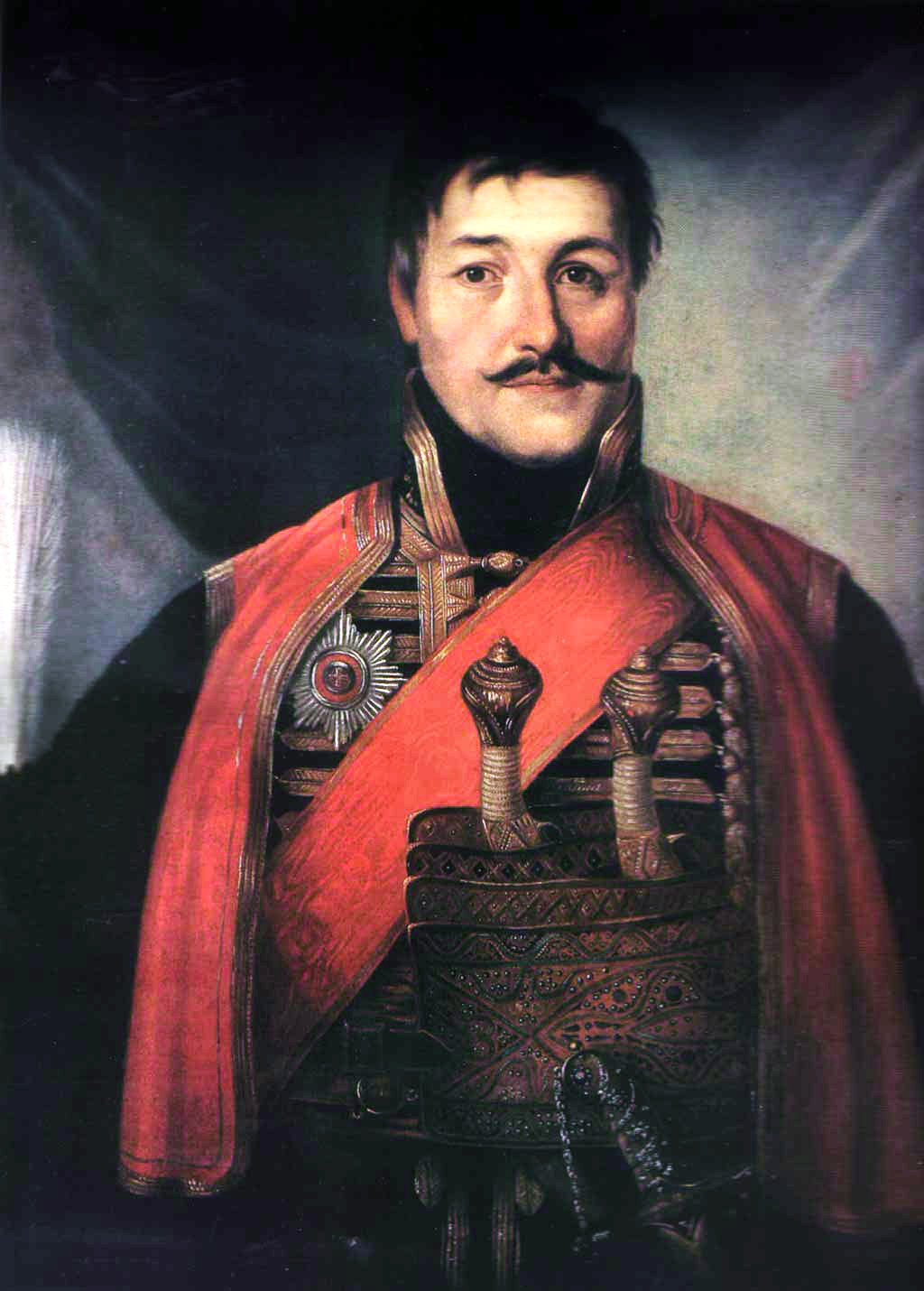
Karađorđe Petrović (Black George) leader of the First Serbian Uprising

During the First Serbian Uprising (1804–1813), Serbia perceived itself as an independent state for the first time after 400 years of Ottoman and short-lasting Austrian occupations. Encouraged by the Russian Empire, the demands for self-government within the Ottoman Empire in 1804 evolved into a war of independence by 1807. Combining patriarchal peasant democracy with modern national goals the Serbian revolution was attracting thousands of volunteers among the Serbs from across the Balkans and Central Europe. The Serbian Revolution ultimately became a symbol of the nation-building process in Southeast Europe, provoking peasant unrest among the Christians in both Greece and Bulgaria. Following a successful siege with 25,000 men, on 8 January 1807 the charismatic leader of the revolt, Karađorđe Petrović, proclaimed Belgrade the capital of Serbia.

Serbs responded to Ottoman brutalities by establishing separate institutions: Governing Council (Praviteljstvujušči Sovjet), the Velika škola, the Theological Academy (Bogoslovija) and other administrative bodies. Karađorđe and other revolutionary leaders sent their children to the Great Academy, which had among its students Vuk Stefanović Karadžić (1787–1864), the reformer of the Serbian alphabet. Belgrade was repopulated by local military leaders, merchants and craftsmen, but also by an important group of enlightened Serbs from the Habsburg Empire who gave a new cultural and political framework to the egalitarian peasant society of Serbia. Dositej Obradović, a prominent figure of the Serbian Enlightenment, the founder of the Great Academy, became the first Minister of Education of Serbia in 1811.

Following the Treaty of Bucharest (May 1812) and French invasion of Russia in June 1812, the Russian Empire withdrew its support for the Serb rebels; unwilling to accept anything less than independence, a quarter of Serbia's population (at the moment around 100,000 people) were exiled into Habsburg Empire, including the leader of the Uprising, Karađorđe Petrović. Recaptured by the Ottomans in October 1813, Belgrade became a scene of brutal revenge, with hundreds of its citizens massacred and thousands sold into slavery as far as Asia. After the Pashalik of Belgrade fell back to the Ottoman rule, various acts of violence and confiscation of people's properties took place. Islamized Serbs and Albanians especially took part in such actions. Direct Ottoman rule also meant the abolition of all Serbian institutions and the return of Ottoman Turks to Serbia.

=== Hadži-Prodan's Revolt (1814) ===
Despite losing the battle, tensions nevertheless persisted. In 1814 an unsuccessful Hadži Prodan's revolt was launched by Hadži Prodan Gligorijević, one of the veterans of the First Serbian Uprising. He knew the Turks would arrest him, so he decided to resist them. Miloš Obrenović, another veteran, felt the time was not right for an uprising and did not provide assistance.

Hadži Prodan's Uprising soon failed and he fled to Austria. After a riot at a Turkish estate in 1814, the Turkish authorities massacred the local population and publicly impaled 200 prisoners at Belgrade. By March 1815, Serbs had held several meetings and decided upon a new revolt.

== Second Serbian Uprising (1815–1817) ==
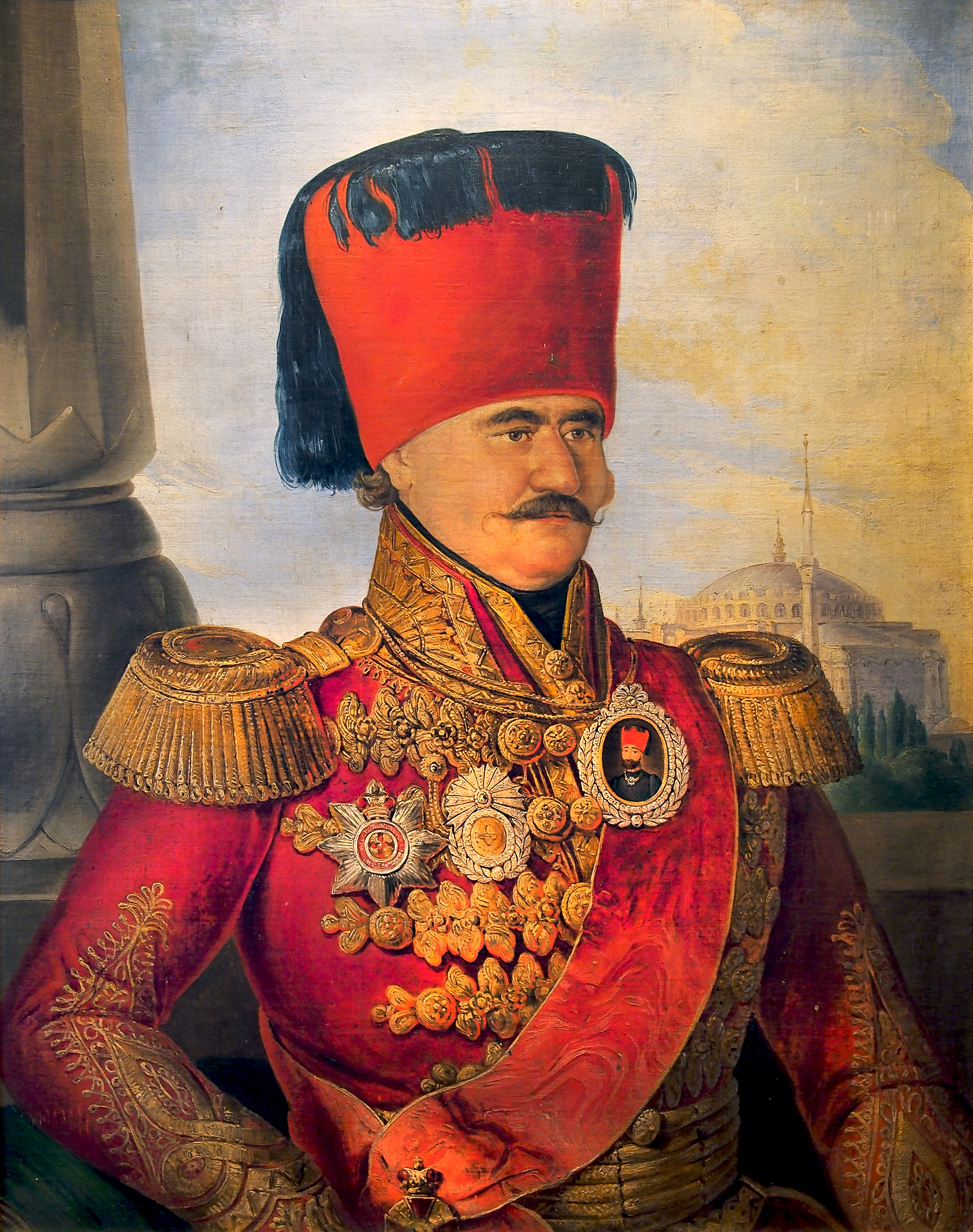
Miloš Obrenović, leader of the Second Serbian Uprising and the first Prince of Serbia

The Second Serbian Uprising (1815–1817) was a second phase of the national revolution of the Serbs against the Ottoman Empire, which erupted shortly after the brutal annexation of the country to the Ottoman Empire and the failed Hadži Prodan's revolt. The revolutionary council proclaimed an uprising in Takovo on April 23, 1815, with Miloš Obrenović chosen as the leader (while Karađorđe was still in exile in Austria). The decision of the Serb leaders was based on two reasons. First, they feared a general massacre of knezes. Secondly, they learned that Karađorđe was planning to return from exile in Russia. The anti-Karađorđe faction, including Miloš Obrenović, was anxious to forestall Karađorđe and keep him out of power.

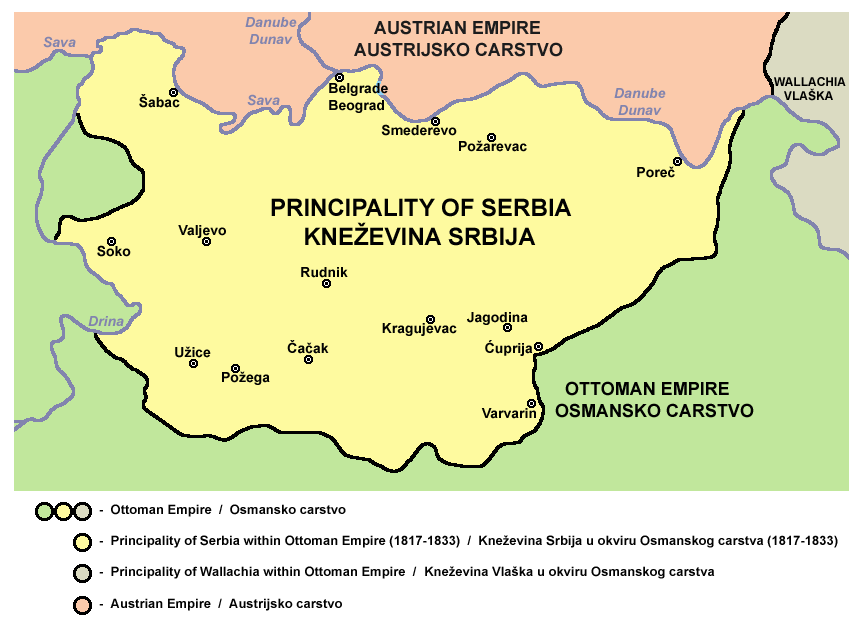
Principality of Serbia in 1817

Fighting resumed at Easter in 1815, and Miloš became supreme leader of the new revolt. When the Ottomans discovered this they sentenced all of its leaders to death. The Serbs fought in battles at Ljubic, Čačak, Palez, Požarevac and Dublje and managed to reconquer the Pashaluk of Belgrade. Miloš advocated a policy of restraint: captured Ottoman soldiers were not killed and civilians were released. His announced goal was not independence but an end to abusive misrule.

Wider European events now helped the Serbian cause. Political and diplomatic means in negotiations between the Prince of Serbia and the Ottoman Porte, instead of further war clashes coincided with the political rules within the framework of Metternich's Europe. Prince Miloš Obrenović, an astute politician and able diplomat, in order to confirm his hard won loyalty to the Porte in 1817 ordered the assassination of Karađorđe Petrović. The final defeat of Napoleon in 1815 raised Turkish fears that Russia might again intervene in the Balkans. To avoid this the sultan agreed to make Serbia a vassal state, semi-independent but nominally responsible to the Porte.

== Legal status of Serbia (1815–1830) ==
In mid-1815, the first negotiations began between Obrenović and Marashli Ali Pasha, the Ottoman governor. The result was acknowledgment of a Serbian Principality by the Ottoman Empire. Although a vassal state of the Porte (yearly tax tribute), it was, in most respects, an independent state. By 1817, Obrenović succeeded in forcing Marashli Ali Pasha to negotiate an unwritten agreement, thus ending the Second Serbian uprising. The same year, Karađorđe, the leader of the First Uprising (and Obrenović's rival for the throne) returned to Serbia and was assassinated by Obrenović's orders; Obrenović subsequently received the title of Prince of Serbia.

During the intermezzo period ("virtual autonomy" – the negotiation process between Belgrade and Constantinople 1817–1830) Prince Miloš Obrenović I secured a gradual but effective reduction of Turkish power and Serbian institutions inevitably filled the vacuum. Despite opposition from the Porte, Miloš created the Serbian army, transferred properties to the young Serbian bourgeoisie and passed the "homestead laws" which protected peasants from usurers and bankruptcies.

New school curriculum and the re-establishment of the Serbian Orthodox Church reflected the Serbian national interest. Unlike the Serbian medieval tradition, Prince Miloš separated education from religion, on the grounds that he could oppose the Church through independent education (secularism) more easily. By that time the Great Academy in Belgrade had been in operation for decades (since 1808).

The Akkerman Convention (1828), the Treaty of Adrianople (1829) and finally, the Hatt-i Sharif (1830), formally recognized the Principality of Serbia as a vassal state with Miloš Obrenović I as its hereditary Prince.

== Gallery ==
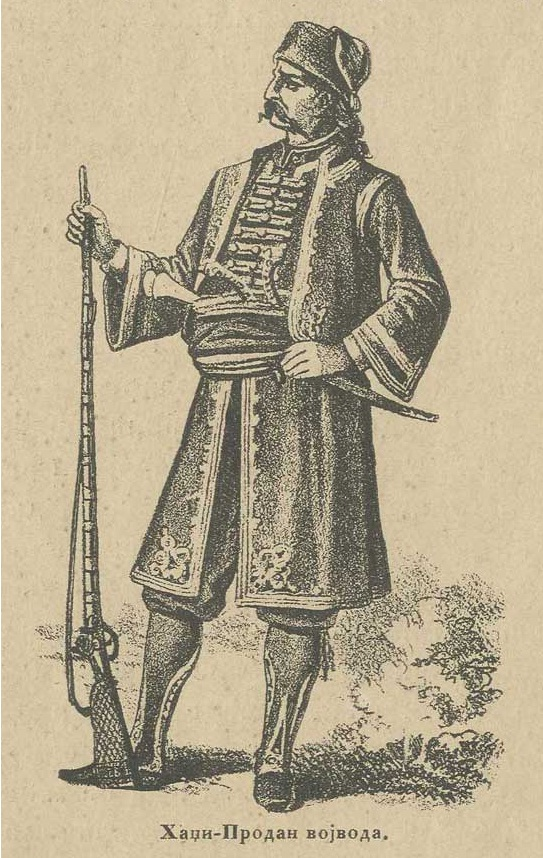
Hadži-Prodan

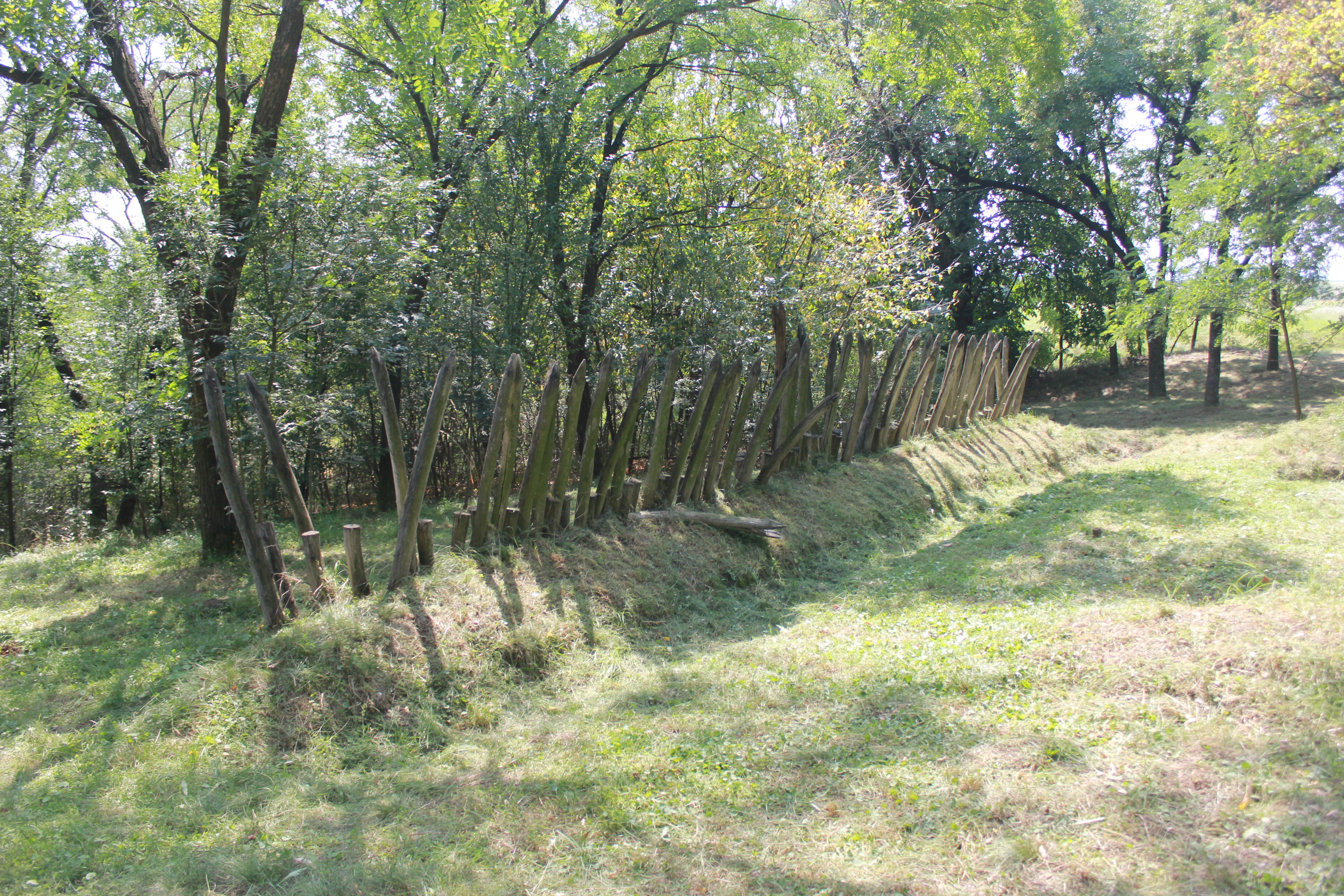
The remains of sconce of battle of Ivankovac

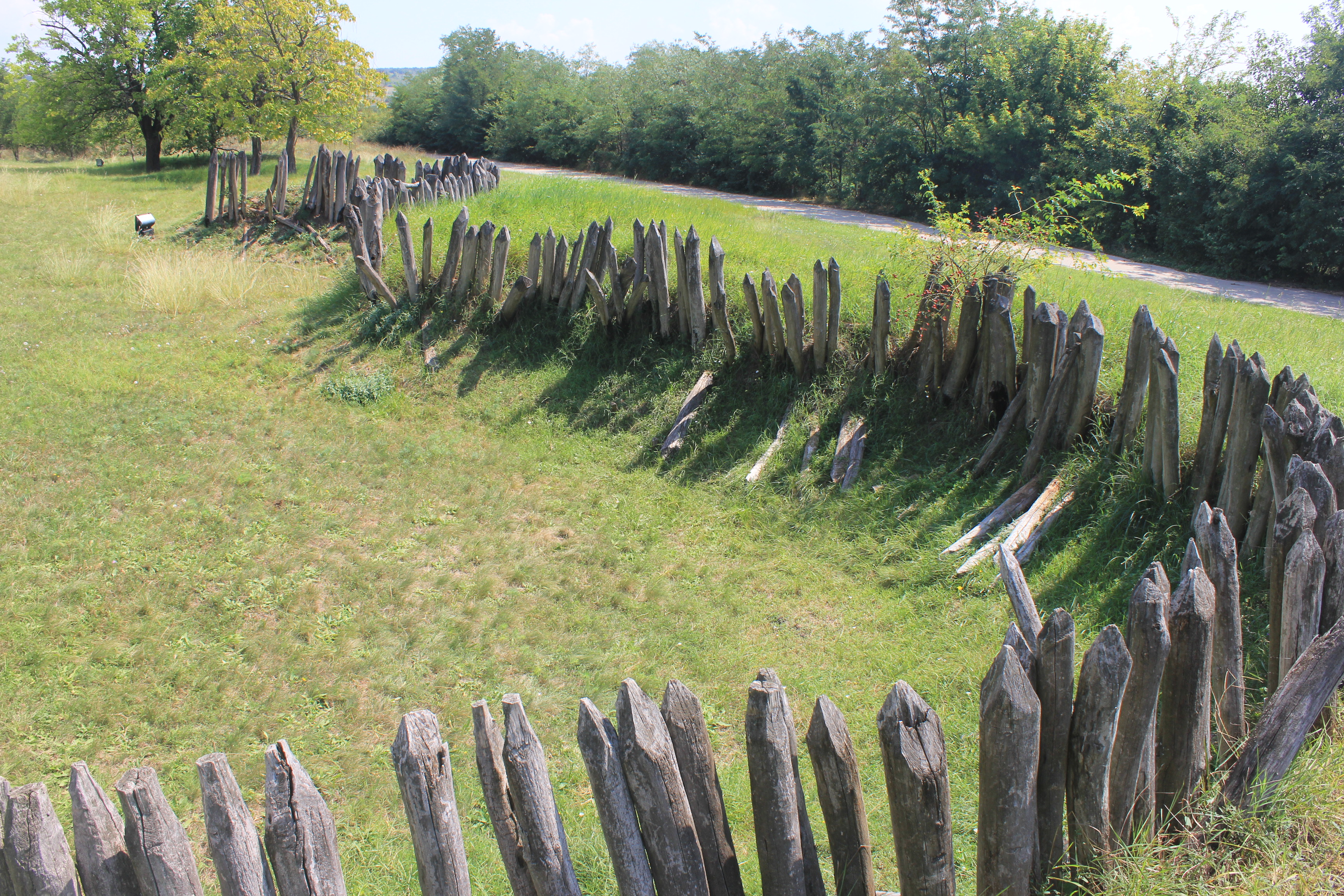
Deligrad battle sconce remains

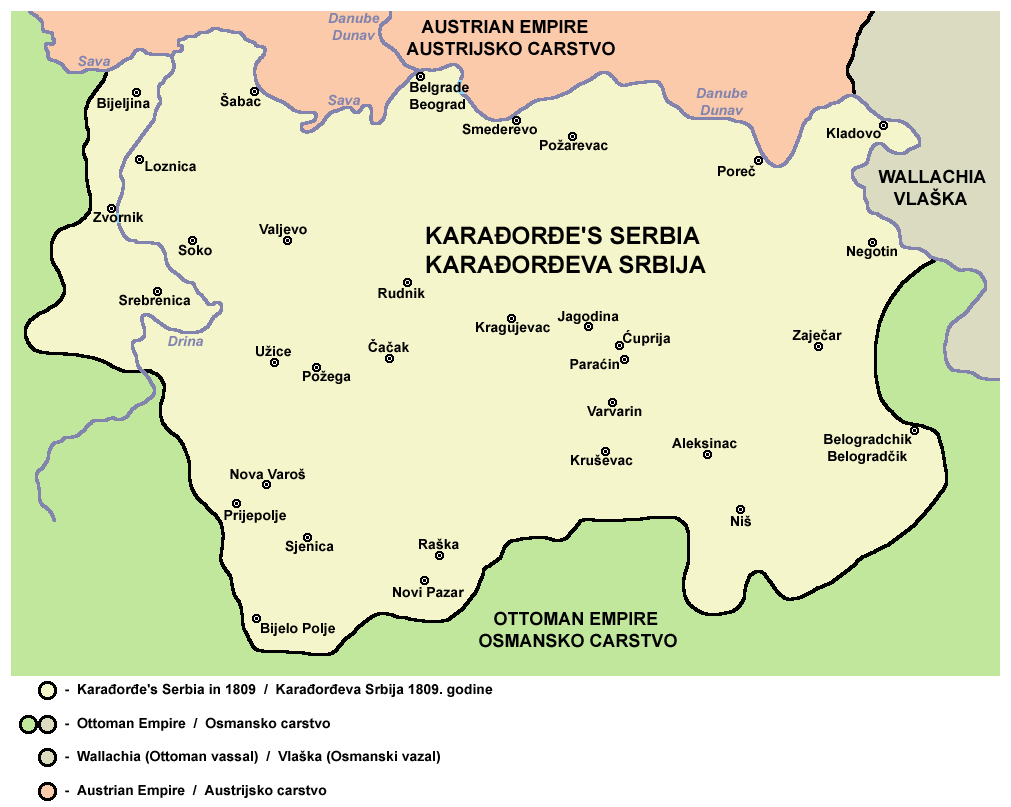
Revolutionary Serbia in 1809

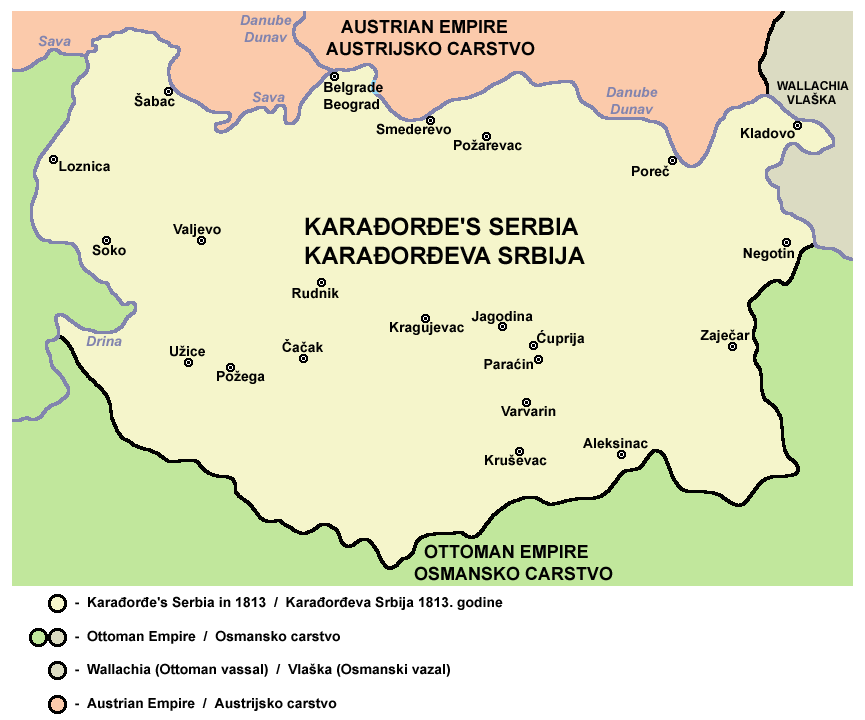
Revolutionary Serbia in 1813

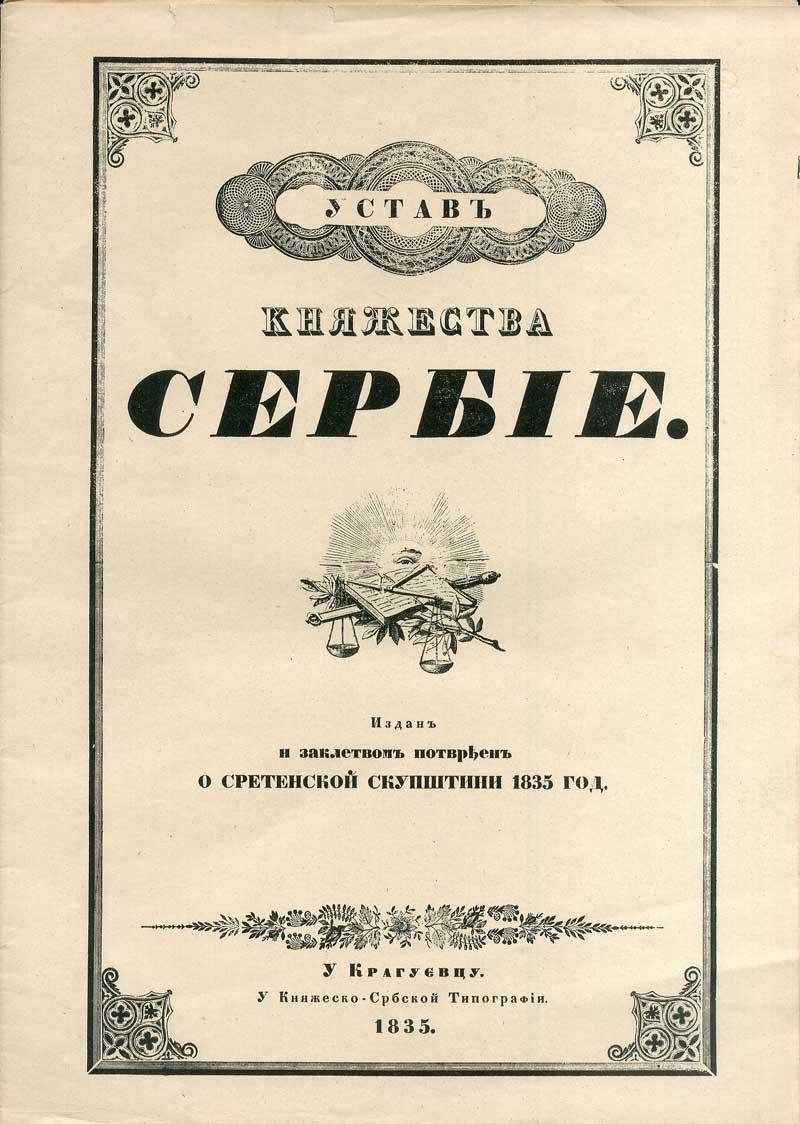
Constitution of 15 February 1835.

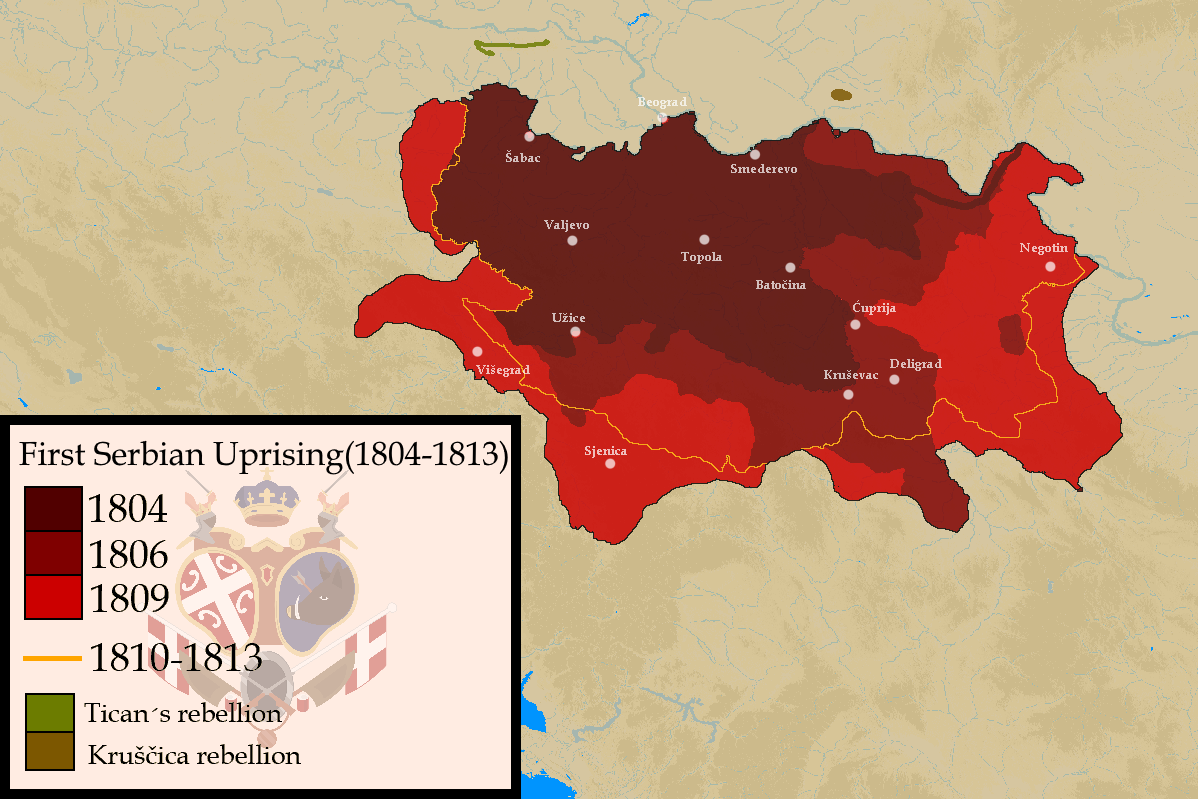
First Serbian Uprising(1804-1813)

== See also ==
- Timeline of the Serbian Revolution
- Principality of Serbia
- Military history of Serbia
- List of Serbian–Ottoman conflicts
- Battles of Batočina and Jagodina (23–27 March 1804)
- Battle of Drlupa (April 1804)
- Battle of Ivankovac (August 1805)
- Battle of Mišar (12–15 August 1806)
- Battle of Deligrad (December 1806)
- Siege of Belgrade (November–December 1806)
- Liberation of Belgrade (1807)
- Ičko's Peace (13 July 1806 – January 1807)
- Battle of Loznica (1807)
- Russian–Serbian Alliance (10 July 1807)
- Kruščica Rebellion (12 July 1808)
- Battle of Čegar (31 May 1809)
- Battle of Suvodol (late May 1809)
- Battle of Varvarin
- Battle of Loznica (17–18 October 1810)
- Hadži Prodan's Revolt (mid–September 1814)

== Sources ==
- Bataković, Dušan T., ed. (2005). Histoire du peuple serbe [History of the Serbian People] (in French). Lausanne: L'Age d'Homme. ISBN 9782825119587. Archived from the original on 2023-01-23.
- Bataković, Dušan T. (2006). "A Balkan-Style French Revolution? The 1804 Serbian Uprising in European Perspective" (PDF). Balcanica (36). Archived (PDF) from the original on 2015-09-23.
- Ćirković, Sima (2004). The Serbs. Malden: Blackwell Publishing. ISBN 9781405142915.
- Jelavich, Barbara (1983). History of the Balkans: Eighteenth and Nineteenth Centuries. Vol. 1. Cambridge University Press. ISBN 9780521252492. Archived from the original on 2023-01-23.
- MacKenzie, David (1996). "The Serbian Warrior Myth and Serbia's Liberation, 1804–1815". Serbian Studies: Journal of the North American Society for Serbian Studies. 10 (2): 133–148. Archived from the original on 2023-01-23.
- Pavlowitch, Stevan K. (2002). Serbia: The History behind the Name. London: Hurst & Company. ISBN 9781850654773. Archived from the original on 2023-01-23.
