= Donja Livadica =

- Village (Selo)
- Location within Serbia
- Coordinates: 44°21′02″N 21°08′27″E
- Country: Serbia
- District: Podunavlje District
- Municipality: Velika Plana
- Elevation: 300 ft (90 m)

Population (2011)
  - Total: 1,709
- Time zone: UTC+1 (CET)
  - Summer (DST): UTC+2 (CEST)

Donja Livadica (Serbian: Доња Ливадица), formerly known as Livadice, is a village in the municipality of Velika Plana, Serbia. According to the 2002 census, the village had a population of 2053 people.
