= Milenko Stojković =

Serbian revolutionary (1769–1831)

Milenko Stojković Миленко Стојковић
- Миленко Стојковић
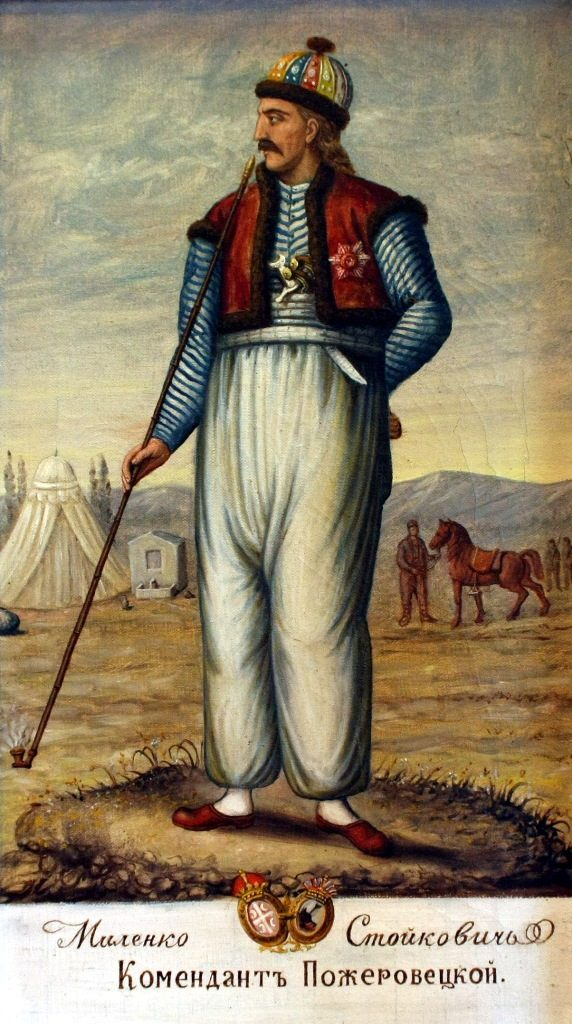
- Milenko Stojković
- Born: Milenko Stojković; 1769; Dobrnje, Sanjak of Smederevo, Ottoman Empire
- Died: 1831
- Military career
- Allegiance: Revolutionary Serbia
- Rank: Bimbaša; Voivode
- Conflicts: Battle of Ivankovac

Milenko Stojković (Serbian Cyrillic: Миленко Стојковић; 1769 – 1831) was a Serbian revolutionary and bimbaša in the First Serbian Uprising early in the 19th century. He is most famous for executing four Dahije (renegade Janissaries) tyrants during the start of the First Serbian Uprising, in vengeance for the "Slaughter of the Knezes".

== Biography ==
Stojković was born in Kličevac, Požarevac. Having apprehended and, while running away, Milenko executed the Turkish tyrants Aganlija, Kučuk Alija, Mula Jusuf, and Mehmed Fočić, responsible for the killing of Serbian Princes that triggered the First Serbian Uprising, on the island of Ada Kaleh on the River Danube. He was also known for keeping a harem of Muslim women who were widows of slain Ottoman Turks.

He distinguished himself in the Battle of Ivankovac, and Battle of Malajnica and Štubik.

In 1810, Stojković and Petar Dobrnjac led a failed revolt against uprising leader Karađorđe, leading them to be banished from Serbia a year later.

He died in Bakhchysarai, Crimea, Russia.

== See also ==
- List of Serbian Revolutionaries
