= Sibnica (Sopot) =

Sibnica Сибница
- Village
- Location within Serbia
- Coordinates: 44°27′N 20°27′E
- Country: Serbia
- District: Belgrade District
- Municipality: Sopot

Population (2022)
  - Total: ▼532
- Time zone: UTC+1 (CET)
  - Summer (DST): UTC+2 (CEST)

Sibnica (Serbian Cyrillic: Сибница) is a village in the municipality of Sopot, Serbia. According to the 2022 census, the village has a population of 532 people.

According to the 2002 census, the village had a population of 686 people.
