= Kličevac =

- Village
- Location within Serbia
- Coordinates: 44°45′N 21°17′E
- Country: Serbia
- District: Braničevo District
- City: Požarevac

Population (2002)
  - Total: 1,329
- Time zone: UTC+1 (CET)
  - Summer (DST): UTC+2 (CEST)
- Website: Klicevac

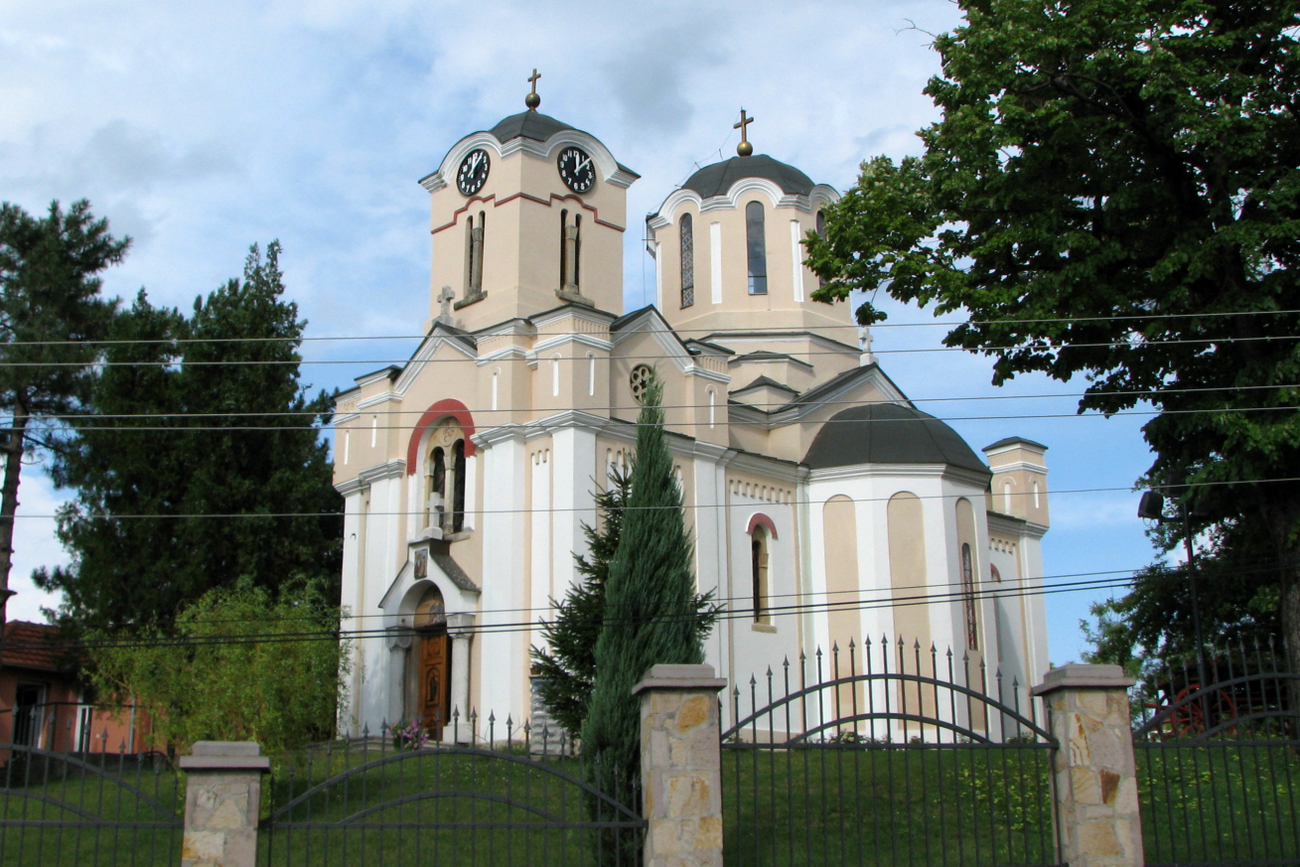
Church of St Trifun, Kličevac, Serbia

Kličevac (Serbian Cyrillic: Кличевац) is a village in the municipality of Požarevac, Serbia. According to the 2002 census, the village had a population of 1,329 people. The population is mainly ethnically Serbian, and the main occupations are agriculture and trade. Many of the Kličevac residents have moved out, becoming year-round guest-workers in Austria, Germany, Switzerland and Italy. Kličevac has a school, for grades K-8, which also serves children from the nearby village of Rečica as well.

== Etymology ==
One legend states that the village derives its name from the word "ključ", meaning "key." Legend has it that a dignitary of the Ottoman government lost the keys to his harem while passing through this previously unnamed village. As these keys meant quite a bit to him, his entourage raised quite an alarm, enlisting the local population to find the keys. Another version of this legend attributes the name to the verb "kliče," meaning "to shout," presumably in reference to the same lost harem keys.

== History ==
The location of Kličevac, along a branch of the river Danube was attractive to Romans. The area is still ripe with thousand-year old Roman remnants, from less significant ones like Roman road bricks, to more interesting ones but rarer, like coins, jewelry, and pottery shards. The villagers have been known to unearth Roman relics while working their fields.

A Bronze Age figurine "The Idol of Kličevac" was found in a grave in the village. It was destroyed during World War I.

A dedicatory monument to Jupiter Dolichenus, inscribed by a priest from Coele Syria, was discovered at this site. Dating back to the 3rd century AD, it represents the most recent monument to this deity known to scholars.

One notable resident of Klicevac was Vojvoda (Duke) Milenko Stojkovic, a guerrilla commander during the First Serbian Uprising against the (Ottoman) Turks.
