= Petar Dobrnjac =

Serbian commander (1771–1831)

- Петар Теодоровић
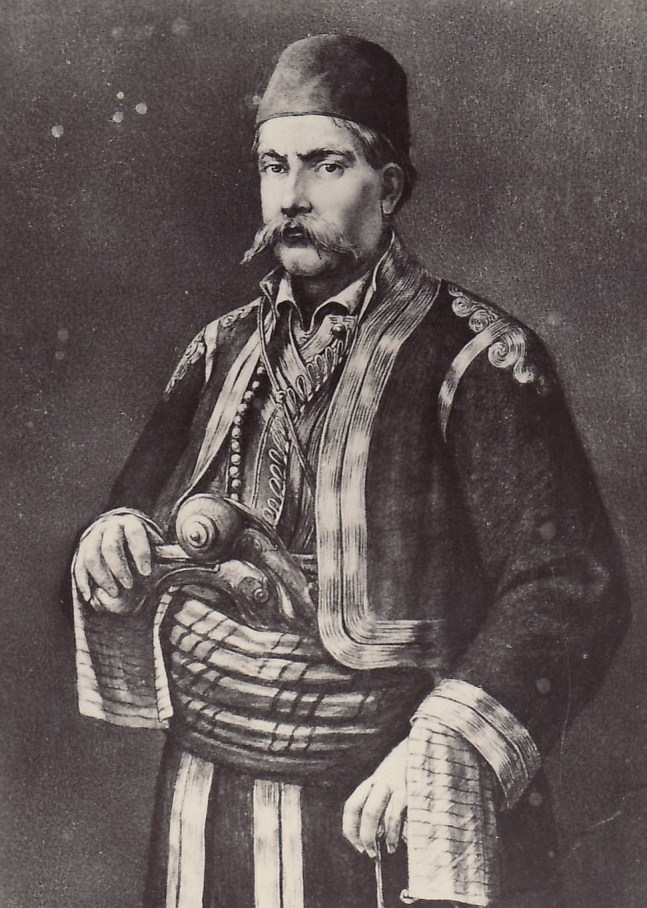
- Petar Dobrnjac
- Born: Petar Teodorović; 1771; Dobrnje, Sanjak of Smederevo, Ottoman Empire
- Died: 1831 (aged 60)
- Other name: Petar Dobrnjac
- Military career
- Allegiance: Revolutionary Serbia
- Rank: buljubaša, bimbaša, vojvoda
- Conflicts: Serbian Revolution: Battle of Ivankovac; Battle of Deligrad; Battle of Čegar

Petar Teodorović (Serbian Cyrillic: Петар Теодоровић; 1771–1831), known as Petar Dobrnjac (Петар Добрњац) was a Serbian Vojvoda in the First Serbian Uprising. He was born in the Požarevac nahija, in the village of Dobrnje, Petrovac. In his youth, he was a hajduk, and later a trader in farm animals. He had a brother Stevan Dobrnjac who with Marko Todorović launched a short-lived revolt against Miloš Obrenović in 1821.

== Role in the Uprising ==
In 1804, the year of the First Serbian Uprising, he was a buljubaša, the commander of a četa (company), under Milenko Stojković. In 1805 he took part in the Battle of Ivankovac against Hafiz Pasha. On his initiative Serbs came to the idea to fortify themself in the battle which proved crucial for Serbian victory. Afterwards, the Governing Council-Soviet (Правитељствујушчи совјет) awarded him the rank of bimbaša (a commander of 1000 men) and Vojvoda.

After the Battle of Deligrad in 1806 against Ibrahim Bushati, pasha of Scutari, he became one of the most important men in Serbia.

== See also ==
- List of Serbian Revolutionaries
