= Lučica, Požarevac =

Village in the Braničevo District, Serbia

Lučica Лучица
- Village
- Location within Serbia
- Country: Serbia
- Region: Southern and Eastern Serbia
- District: Braničevo
- City: Požarevac

Population (2022)
  - Total: 1,913
- Time zone: UTC+1 (CET)
  - Summer (DST): UTC+2 (CEST)

Lučica (Serbian Cyrillic: Лучица) is a village near the city of Požarevac in the Braničevo District of Serbia. As of the 2022 census, it has a population of 1,913.

== See also ==
- List of populated places in Serbia
