= Dobrnje =

- Village
- Consecration of the monument to Voivoda Petar Dobrnjac in Dobrnje, 2004

- Location within Serbia
- Coordinates: 44°20′17″N 21°20′59″E
- Country: Serbia
- District: Braničevo
- Municipality: Petrovac na Mlavi

Area
  - Total: 5.40 sq mi (13.99 km^{2})

Population (2022)
  - Total: 447
  - Density: 82.8/sq mi (31.95/km^{2})
- Time zone: UTC+1 (CET)
  - Summer (DST): UTC+2 (CEST)

Dobrnje is a village situated in Petrovac na Mlavi municipality in Serbia.
