= Blockade of Belgrade (First Serbian Uprising) =

Military operation part of the first Serbian uprising

- Part of First Serbian Uprising
- Type: blockade
- Location: Belgrade, Ottoman Empire
- Planned: April 1804
- Commanded by: Karađorđe, Janko Katić, Vasa Čarapić, Sima Marković
- Objective: Blockade and capture of Belgrade
- Date: April 1804–December 1806
- Executed by: Serbian rebel army, combined nahija units
- Outcome: siege of Belgrade

The blockade or encirclement of Belgrade refers to the Serbian rebel blockade of Belgrade, the capital of the Sanjak of Smederevo (or "Belgrade Pashalik"), initially in the hands of the Dahije (renegade Janissaries) that had wrested the power in the province, and then against the Ottoman Empire itself, during the First Serbian Uprising. It included a range of skirmishes in the years of 1804–1806, culminating in the assault and final siege of Belgrade.

== Background ==
The Dahije (renegade Janissaries) wrested the Belgrade Pashalik and murdered the Vizier Hadji Mustafa Pasha in 1801, and instead of the Porte dealing with the tyranny or sending an investigative commission, it sent pashas according to the Dahije's wishes. The Slaughter of the Knezes in late January prompted the Serbs to rise up against the Dahije. After the burning of the Inns and wounding of Dahije leader Aganlija at Drlupa, Karađorđe went with his rebel army to meet with Sima Marković and Janko Katić in the Belgrade nahiya on 25 February and at the Lipe Assembly, the first siege line towards Belgrade was set up with Sima holding Železnik with his knežina army, Katić holding Kneževac with his Turija knežina army, and Vasa Čarapić holding Avala with his Grocka knežina army. The plan was to block the city, stop the Dahije from entering Serb villages, and preventing resupply. Karađorđe then went to the Smederevo nahiya where the blockade of Smederevo was organized. After the takeover of Rudnik and Valjevo by 18 March, and the tight blockade of Šabac and Smederevo, the strategical encirclement of Belgrade could be said to have been finalized.

At Belgrade, the Vizier was Agha Hasan Pasha, who the Serbs pretendedly recognized as such. The Dahije were the true rulers of the Belgrade Pashalik, and Hasan Pasha had no powers nor influence. Hasan Pasha informed the Grand Vizier about events in the Serb uprising against the Dahije.

== March–April 1804 ==
The rebel Belgrade defensive line was not uniform, and Dahije dispatches crossed it at times, such as on 3 March when a Janissary unit clashed with a rebel army numbering 500 towards Ostružnica and was partly destroyed with prisoners, according to a Semlin military command report. A retaliatory Dahije expedition was made on 14 March, resulting in 1,000 Serb refugees crossing over to Habsburg-held territory around Jakovo. In the following days, Dahije units of 200–400 men sortied each day, and Dahije leader Mula Jusuf led a unit of 300 cavalry that killed a number of civilians at Železnik and then went to Ostružnica, from where the rebels retreated into the woods, and where the church was burnt down and all movable property looted, with seven heads put on spears and paraded into Belgrade. Another Dahije attack on a 30-man-unit at Avala gained them more trophy heads. On 19 March the Belgrade cavalry exited the Fortress and went for Ritopek and Vrčin, where they found a rebel trench and were reinforced with 300 men. That same day, kabadahija Tosun-aga went with 80 men by boat to Grocka, which was about to be attacked by the rebels. These Dahije sorties were made to pressure the rebels and disperse them from the environs of Belgrade. At that time, the Dahije awaited reinforcements of mercenaries (kircali) who were located in the Sanjak of Niš, to the southeast of the Pashalik. The Dahije sent another of their leaders, Kučuk-Alija, with 600 cavalry to gather reinforcements, mercenaries and supplies, towards Kragujevac and Jagodina.

Bad weather resulted in a failed siege of Jagodina in which the Serbian rebels were defeated and dispersed, around the last day of March. Karađorđe inspected the Ostružnica–Višnjica line and a 40-men rebel cavalry unit surprise attacked a Belgrade Turk contingent near Mokri Lug on 1 April. The Serbian rebels then retreated towards Žarkovo and Kneževac, from where a detachment attacked a Dahije meyhane at Boleč. 1,000 rebels remained in the encirclement of Belgrade, controlling all major crossings and destroying river bridges near Belgrade. The encirclement of Belgrade was strengthened with Vasa Čarapić at Avala, Đorđe Milovanović at Železnik, Miloje Trnavac and Ranko Marković around Ostružnica. Muhasil Suleyman Agha wrote to the Porte on 6 April about the harsh position of besieged Belgrade. Čarapić defeated a Janissary unit of 230 men under Mula-Jusuf near Mirijevo on 15 April. After the first battle at Jagodina, the Serbian rebels mustered a new army and planned for a better attack, and succeeded with an assault on Jagodina on 16 April led by Karađorđe, killed 300, captured many, and forced Kučuk-Alija to flee. By now, only Belgrade, Smederevo and Požarevac were among important cities held by the Janissaries, all blocked by the rebels. After the victory at Jagodina, smaller rebel units pursued Kučuk-Alija through Šumadija, successfully ambushing twice in 17–18 April. A French report speaks of a Serbian provocation on 17 April that ended with an ambush of 300–400 Janissaries likely near Mokroluški Creek, leaving at least 50 dead. Upon the return of Kučuk-Alija to Belgrade, he improved the defense of the city by cleaning the trenches and setting up parapets, among other things. The rebels evacuated the Serb civilians in the Belgrade environs to the hinterland, mainly Ostružnica, by now an important rebel camp. A rebel incursion into Vračar failed on 20 April, with one dead and 12 captured. An Austrian newspaper reported on the defeat of 40 Turks who looted outside the Belgrade city, with 30 of them killed, on 24 April. It was believed that by late April, there were outposts outside Belgrade numbering some 4,000 rebels. The Belgrade yerli (native Muslims) contemplated settling relations with the Serbs; Gavrilo Kovačević claimed that they twice sent secret letters to the Serbs asking them take over the city, but they were unable to do so, as they were unready and Karađorđe engaged Kučuk-Alija at Jagodina.

== May–July 1804 ==
According to Karađorđe's captain Petar Jokić, Čarapić was ordered to set up a trench at Rakovica, Katić at Resnik, while Sima was at Železnik where there were several smaller trenches, in the days prior to Karađorđe's and his Jasenica troops' stay at Ostružnica during Orthodox Easter (6 May [O.S. 24 April] 1804). At the Zemun Meeting (10 May), mediated by the Habsburg military command in Syrmia, the rebels and Dahije–Sanjak representatives failed to come to an agreement; at the end of discussions the Serbs made clear that they would all rather die than let the Dahije stay in Belgrade, and that they soon, with 20,000 men would assault Belgrade to deal with the Dahije once and for all. Karađorđe supported the siege of Požarevac in May, during which the Turk Belgrade garrison attacked the Valjevo nahija army at Careva Ćuprija in Topčider, but was repelled by commanders Matija Nenadović and Luka Lazarević who proceeded to attack the Muslim-inhabited Savamala that was abandoned for the trench at Varoš-kapija during the garrison's retreat from Topčider. After the takeover of Požarevac (late May) and Smederevo (4 June), only Belgrade remained outside rebel control in the north of the Belgrade Pashalik. Karađorđe, Jakov Nenadović and Milenko Stojković went to Vračar. Karađorđe organized a tighter blockade and reinforced the troops at Topčider and set up two cannons there. A camp and military church was set up at Topčider. On the road to the Stambol Gate, another camp was set up under the command of Čarapić. The Valjevo army at Topčider paid for Austrian intelligence in Semlin (Zemun) on Turk attacks, and were warned through burning of straws and bulrush, and were also informed by Zemun merchants who worked in Belgrade.

In mid-June 1804, a large Serbian rebel army with the most important commanders mustered outside Belgrade. There are claims of up to 16,000 rebels, out of which 6,000 planned to assault the city. At this point, the Sultan issued a ferman (decree) to Karađorđe to not attack the city, as the Sultan had sent for an Ottoman Bosnian army to aid the rebels against the Dahije. The rebels aborted the assault. Vizier Bekir Pasha of Bosnia was given the mission to stop the fighting between the Dahije and Serbs, to bring peace and security to the Belgrade Pashalik and Ottoman frontier.

Bekir Pasha mustered an army of over 3,000, 3,500 or 4,600 Ottoman Bosnian soldiers and various sipahi and from Zvornik sent a mühür-sahib (official seal carrier) to Karađorđe and the Serbian leadership at Vračar, and a letter to the Dahije in Belgrade, that he brought the Sultan's ferman and was commissioned to make peace between the Dahije and Serbs. The mühür-sahib stayed at Vračar for five days, and was hosted nicely by the Serbs, while the Dahije refused to meet with him. Karađorđe approved of Bekir Pasha's arrival into Serbia, also on the advice of Hadji Sali Bey of Srebrenica, who was a pen pal of Matija Nenadović and had informed the Porte about the Dahije abuse and helped its decision in sending this commission.

Karađorđe sent knez Milovan Grbović with some Šabac kmets (serfs) and 50 cavalry to meet with Bekir at the Drina on 24 June [O.S. 12 June] 1804, or many Mačva kmets welcomed Bekir at the Drina and Grbović welcomed him at Šabac on 26 June [O.S. 14 June] 1804. Grbović escorted Bekir's army to Palež (Obrenovac) where Jakov Nenadović, Sima Marković and Janko Katić with 500 or 600 cavalry welcomed Bekir Pasha and let him spend the night. The trio escorted him, arriving at Žarkovo and Bekir Pasha made camp at a mansion in Bele Vode. The Serbian leadership decided that Bekir Pasha stay at Bele Vode until the matter with the Dahije was handled. The four Dahije leaders had escaped Belgrade on chaikas down the Danube to Adakale, as they feared a conspiracy by mercenary leader Alija Gušanac and not knowing Bekir Pasha's intention with them. The dating of their escape is unclear in historiography. The historian K. Nenadović believed that Bekir had in fact allowed the four leaders to secretly leave. Upon hearing of the Dahije leaders' flight, Alija Gušanac looted their mansions, and took control of Belgrade. Karađorđe ordered for a parade with 4,000 men at Topčider, for Bekir to see. From Vračar, Karađorđe took Matija Nenadović and 200 of the best cavalry with him to Bele Vode, where outside Bekir's camp, these with Katić's cavalry encircled from three sides. According to K. Protić, there were 2,000 Serb cavalry at Bele Vode, as to protect from a potential attack. Karađorđe, Matija, Jakov, Sima and Katić entered Bekir's tent. Bekir promised improvements on the Serbs' status, while Karađorđe stressed that they would not stop until the Dahije were caught dead or alive, and knowing that the Dahije could muster an army of the Vidin Pashalik and attack at any time, both sides agreed for them to be assassinated. Bekir had insufficient troops to defend against a potential Serb attack, witnessing the strength in the rebel camps in the area, and wanted to enter the Belgrade Fortress as soon as possible. Milenko Stojković carried out the mission, besieging the house at Adakale where the Dahije stayed, shooting them and having their heads cut off and sent to Belgrade where they were put on stakes.

Karađorđe ordered the army to escort and parade Bekir into Belgrade, with gun, and cannon salute from two iron cannons. According to K. Nenadović the sight of the Serbian army and cannon salute visibly scared Bekir and his army.

== Ceasefire ==
Bekir Pasha entered the Lower City of Belgrade and Karađorđe sent representatives with demands made earlier at the failed Zemun Meeting. Alija Gušanac did not let Bekir Pasha into the Upper City, where he stayed with his mercenaries. Upon Bekir's arrival, the skirmishes around Belgrade and Vračar stopped, and Serbs were allowed into the city market to trade. In mid-August, the former muhasil (Porte contact) in Belgrade, Suleiman Agha (now Suleiman Pasha), was appointed the Vizier of Belgrade, replacing Agha Hasan Pasha. An Austrian report dated 25 August noted that the Porte now believed that the cause of the Serbian uprising had ended with the deaths of the Dahije leaders and that the Porte would ensure peace through righteous and gentle treatment towards the Serbs. One of Bekir Pasha's letters was saved in the Nenadović family, and in it he promises that the Serbs would have a better life than during even Hadji Mustafa Pasha's tenure, but a review shows that no real guarantees were made. The Serbs did not want to return under Ottoman rule and wanted no interference in their affairs; the rebel leadership secretly sent delegations to Austria and Russia to ask for aid and for Serbia to become a protectorate. The delegation to Russia was sent on 13 September [O.S. 1 September] 1804. The Serbs were unfortunately forced to supply Bekir's army, Gušanac's mercenaries, and Suleiman's servants, but this was not the case for long. As Bekir believed he had suppressed the rebellion, he asked Karađorđe to disperse the rebels and go home in peace. The rebel leadership sent a delegation to Bekir with conditions for peace and progression in the Pashalik, which Bekir promised to do his best with at the Porte. The rebels further demanded that apart from an Ottoman guarantee, they wanted an Austrian guarantee, which Bekir took as an insult against the Ottoman Empire and refused. The Serbs decided to continue the fight for liberation. Gušanac's mercenaries, numbering some 1,000, were still present and posed a threat, as they were capable of doing the same damage to the Serbs as the Dahije had done earlier.

Bekir was extorted by Gušanac, who wanted pay for warring against the Serbs and would not let him leave Belgrade; Bekir had no money to pay and instead asked the Serbs to pay Gušanac some 200,000 groschen, of which half was paid up front and the rest was vouched for by Recep Agha, the nephew of commander Ibrahim Agha of Adakale, in the name of the Serbs. The rebel leadership loaned money from Austrian merchants and planned to tax the population to the amount of 500,000 groschen, to pay off that loan, and ammunition and other war necessities bought in the summer. Bekir Pasha returned to Bosnia by the winter, staying until October. The Serbian rebels continued the blockade of Belgrade. Bekir Pasha left Belgrade and made camp at the Palež mansion on 28 October [O.S. 16 October] 1804 (dated by K. Nenadović), being escorted by Jakov, whom he asked to transport his cannons and ammunition to Bosnia "if you are, as you say, the Sultan's rayah", and "if not ... here you have it ... do with it as you wish"; the Serbian rebels transported and gave over the equipment as to show the Porte that they fought only against the Empire's enemies and evildoers. Gušanac remained in Belgrade, holding the real power in the city, with Suleiman Pasha having no power nor influence (as the Dahije before, towards Agha Hasan Pasha), also having been tricked that the Serbs would help in making him the Pasha of Belgrade. It was clear that the Ottoman Empire had no sovereignty in the Pashalik.

Karađorđe ordered Katić and Čarapić to monitor Belgrade and Turk movement, and they continued to camp around Belgrade until springtime 1805, while most of the rebel army were given leave, except for some bands in the frontiers. Karađorđe set up armed bands outside Belgrade to watch Gušanac's mercenaries. Smaller number of troops were set up outside Smederevo, Šabac, by the Drina, towards Užice, Čačak, and Karanovac, while the rest was sent to rest. In the winter of 1804–05, Gušanac's mercenaries had risen sharply in numbers, and the sipahi (noble cavalry) began to assemble. Karađorđe did not fear for the urban Turks, but was watchful on the neighbouring sanjaks. In December, the leadership received information that Mus-aga Fočić mustered troops in Bosnia, Bekir Pasha mobilized 8,000 planning to cross the Drina again, and that Hafiz Mustafa Agha had mustered 20,000 in the Sanjak of Niš, with the bey of Leskovac. The ceasefire stretched to 1 January 1805 and Karađorđe ordered the day after Orthodox Christmas (7 January 1805) for the resting army to assemblages. Belgrade was peaceful until February 1805.

== 1805 ==
According to K. Nenadović, Karađorđe organized on 23 January [O.S. 11 January] 1805 the army in the following way:

- 4000 men by the Drina, under Jakov Nenadović.
- 2000 men by the Morava, under Milenko Stojković.
- 5000 men in the blockade of Belgrade, under Janko Katić and Vasa Čarapić.
- 3000 men at Ostružnica and 500 at Grocka, under Sima Marković.
- Smaller detachments outside untaken towns and cities.

In the meantime, according to Batalaka, as Karađorđe had promised Gušanac that he would support his elevation to Pasha of Belgrade, he did the same to Recep Agha, who had helped in the assassination of the Dahije leaders, on the premise that he get rid of Gušanac. Karađorđe's promise to the other was unbeknownst to them, respectively, and was made to cause disorder. Recep Agha managed to set against some commanders in Gušanac's army, who left the city into the town with their men, but Gušanac remained the more powerful. Thus, seeing that he couldn't win, Recep readied to leave Belgrade for Adakale with part of Gušanac's deserters, which Gušanac learnt and became enraged with, and immediately had Katić informed of this and that he would let the Serbs do whatever they wanted in relation to this. Karađorđe gave instructions to attack these on their way, with one detachment of 300–400 men to attack at Kulič, a Morava bridge to Adakale. Seeing Katić at the head of such a unit, the ones bound to Adakale figured it out, and one of them shot and missed Katić. This played into the Serbs' hand, who fusilladed and dispersed them. According to K. Nenadović, Karađorđe destroyed the 300 kircali at Batočina in early February and he makes no mention of Recep's conspiracy. Milenko Stojković destroyed a binbaşı and his men at the Mlava confluence. Those captured were taken to Smederevska Palanka and executed. These events made it clear that Serbs and Turks could not make peace, and the Turks were now in unison to fight the Serbs; Bekir Pasha informed the Porte and commented that "the Serbs are no longer rayah".

The Russian delegation returned in February with good news, foreign minister Czartoryski deciding to take up the Serbian cause at the Porte, although it was made clear that Russia sought good relations with the Porte and wouldn't aid in the uprising. Meanwhile, the Porte tasked Wallachian ruler Constantine Ypsilantis to work on making peace with the Serbs.

The Serbian rebel leadership held an assembly at Pećani on 29 April [O.S. 17 April] 1805 where 500,000 groschen were collected to pay for Bekir Pasha, the kircali, and ammunition and war necessities. The kircali sent two agents who gave over a false ferman claiming the Sultan would severely punish the Serbs, which strengthened the decision to fight to the death. The 9-point demands were sent to Sultan Selim I and a delegation set out on 13 May [O.S. 1 May] 1805 for Constantinople, being escorted via Wallachia by Ypsilantis, arriving on 9 June [O.S. 28 May] 1805. As the Porte had problems elsewhere in the empire, such as Ali Pasha in northern Greece and civil war in Egypt, it met the delegation favourably, but in reality planned for the attack on Serbia as soon as possible. Deputy Stefan Živković returned from Constantinople and told the people that the Sultan supported their demands, in order to not alarm them, but warned Karađorđe that Hafiz Pasha set out to destroy them, as Karađorđe already knew and planned for.

== See also ==
- Timeline of the Serbian Revolution
- Assemblies of the Serbian Revolution
- Serbian Army (revolutionary)
- List of Serbian Revolutionaries

== Annotations ==
1. According to K. Nenadović the Dahije's escape was the same night as Bekir arrived at Bele Vode (around 25 June [O.S. 13 June] 1804), and Batalaka too recorded it as that night, but did not give a date. According to K. Protić, Bekir arrived at Šabac on 26 June [O.S. 14 June] 1804, but did not date his arrival at Bele Vode. According to D. Perović, the Dahije escaped on 17 July 1804. According to V. Stojančević, Bekir arrived at the Belgrade Fortress on 12 July 1804.

== Sources ==
- Batalaka, Lazar Arsenijević (1898). Историја српског устанка [History of the Serbian Uprising]. Vol. I. Izd. Batalakinoga fonda.
- Jovanović, Dobrivoje (2014) [2009]. "ПРВЕ БОРБЕ СА ТУРЦИМА И ОСЛОБОЂЕЊЕ ЈАГОДИНЕ 1804.ГОДИНЕ" (PDF). Прошлост. 3. Историјски архив Јагодина.
- Nenadović, Konstantin N. (1884). Живот и дела великог Ђорђа Петровића Кара-Ђорђа [Life and Deeds of Great Đorđe Petrović Kara-Đorđe]. Vol. II (1 ed.). Vienna: У Штампарији Јована Н. Вернаја – via Google Books.
- Nenadović, Konstantin N. (1903) [1883]. Живот и дела великог Ђорђа Петровића Кара-Ђорђа [Life and Deeds of Great Đorđe Petrović Kara-Đorđe]. Vol. I (2 ed.). Belgrade: Штампа Савића и Комп. – via Archive.org.
- Novaković, Stojan (1904). Устанак на дахије 1804 [Uprising against the Dahije]. Штампано у Државној штампарији – via Archive.org.
- Perović, Dušan (1976). "Osnovni ciljevi prvog ustanka". Историјски часопис. 23. Istorijski institut: 51-.
- Protić, Kosta (1893). "Ратни догађаји из првога српског устанка под Карађорђем Петровићем 1804—1813". Годишњица Николе Чупића. XIII. Državna štamparija: 114–116.
- Stojančević, Vladimir (1957). "Борбе за ослобођење Београда 1804–1806 године" (PDF). ГОДИШЊАК. IV. Музеј града Београда: 111–142.
