= Zemun Meeting =

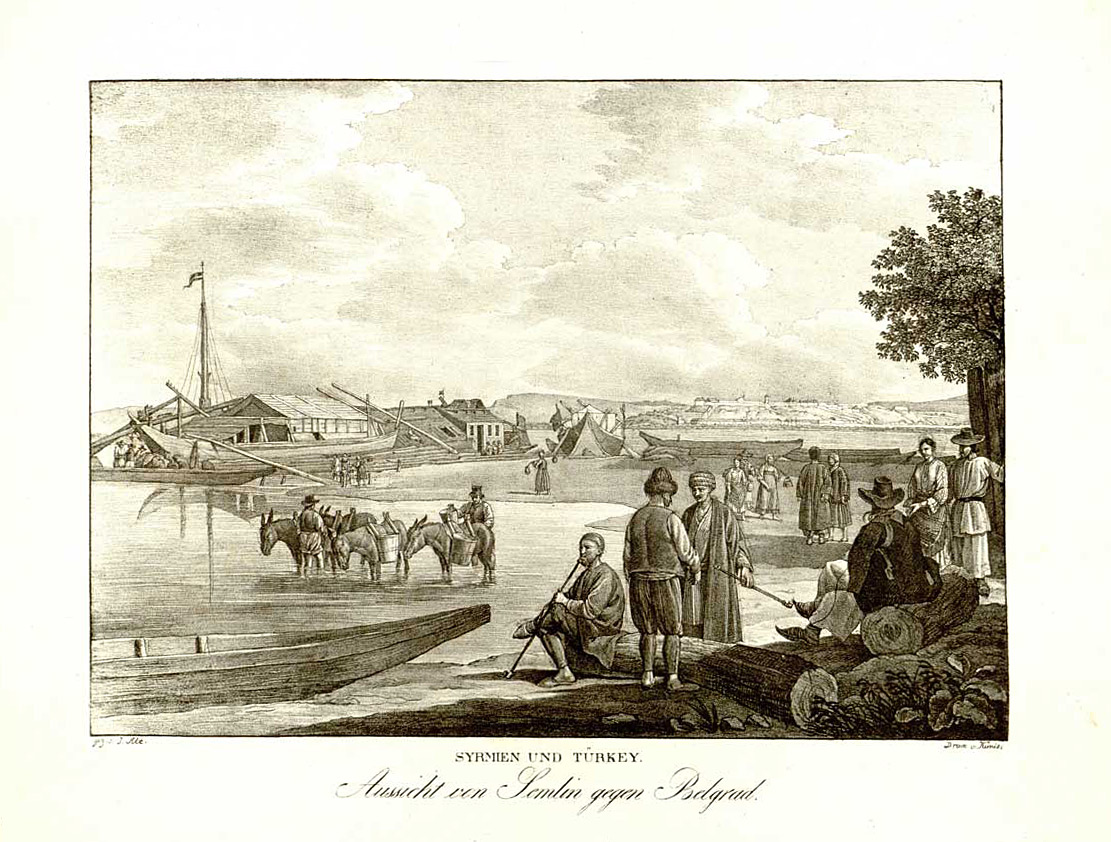
- "View of Belgrade from Zemun", by A. Kunike (1826)
- Date: 10 May 1804
- Location: Semlin (Zemun), Habsburg monarchy (now Serbia)
- Type: Mediation
- Theme: First Serbian Uprising
- Organised by: Slavonian Military Frontier, general Geneyne
- Participants: Serbian rebel leadership and Dahije/Belgrade Pashalik representatives
- Outcome: Failed

The Zemun Meeting was a negotiation between the Serbian rebel leadership and the Dahije (renegade Janissaries) regarding matters in the Sanjak of Smederevo ("Belgrade Pashalik"), mediated by the Austrian military command in Semlin (Zemun) in May 1804.

The neighbouring Military Frontier government had friendly relations with the Serbs in the beginning of the uprising, allowing refugees and overlooking arms smuggling. In the early days, the archpriest Matija Nenadović bought ammunition and petitioned Habsburg Serb metropolitan Stefan Stratimirović and the commander of Peterwardein (Petrovaradin), Geneyne, to aid the uprising with ammunition, a cannon, or officers, which was declined, as there was peace between the Ottoman Empire and the Habsburg monarchy. Following the rebel victory at Jagodina, the pursuit of Kučuk-Alija, and takeover of Šabac, only Belgrade, Smederevo and Požarevac remained outside rebel control in the northern part of the Pashalik. The Habsburg monarchy ("Austria") was alarmed with the rebellion expanding into a war in the south of its borders. The Austrian Peterwardein (Petrovaradin) general-command (of the Slavonian Military Frontier) declined archpriest Matija's petition of aiding the Serbian uprising, answering that the Austrian government was in friendship with the Porte and could not aid in any way, except to mediate between the Serbs and the Dahije. Matija had worked on gaining Austrian aid or mediation since the beginning of March 1804. The Austrian command sent general Geneyne, the commander of Petrovaradin, to Zemun to try to settle the affairs or at least gain knowledge on what was really happening. Back in the Belgrade Pashalik, the Serbian rebels organized a blockade of Belgrade. In April, supreme commander Karađorđe asked the Military Frontier government to put Serbia under its protection.

== Delegations ==
Geneyne called both Dahije and the Serbian leadership to discuss peace. The Dahije declined to come in person and instead sent 20 representatives (in a group of 30–40), including:

- Suleyman Agha, the former muhasil (Porte contact).
- Ibrahim Agha, the current muhasil and customs officer.
- Ibrahim Bey, kethüda (assistant) of Vizier Hasan Pasha.
- Ibrahim-Foč Efendi, Janissary efendi (elder).
- Rustem Efendi, kadi (judge) in Belgrade.
- The divan-efendi (chief clerk) of Vizier Hasan Pasha.
- The alaibey (sipahi commander).
- The cebecibaşı (arsenal commander) of Belgrade.
- Many chosen Belgrade yerli (natives) and elders.

The Serbian rebel leadership first assembled at Ostružnica, where it was decided to begin negotiations. Matija had received a letter at the end of the siege of Šabac from Karađorđe to appear. The delegation sent to Zemun was decided at the Ostružnica assembly. Among the Serbian leadership present were:

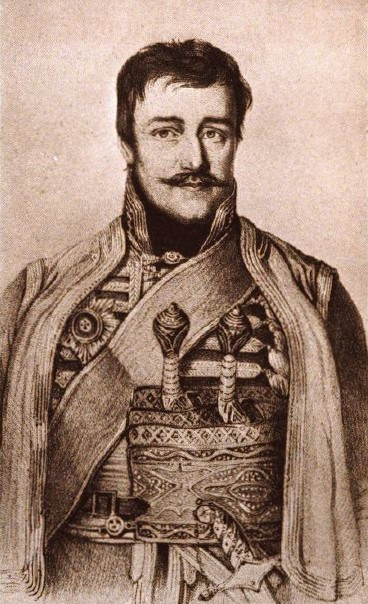
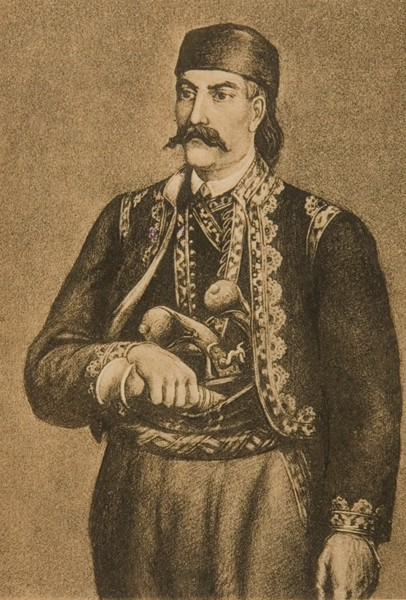
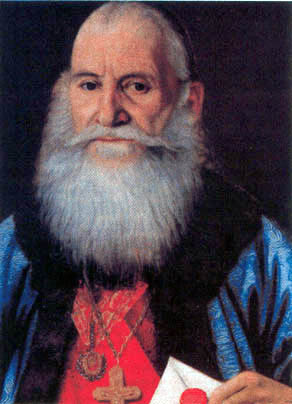
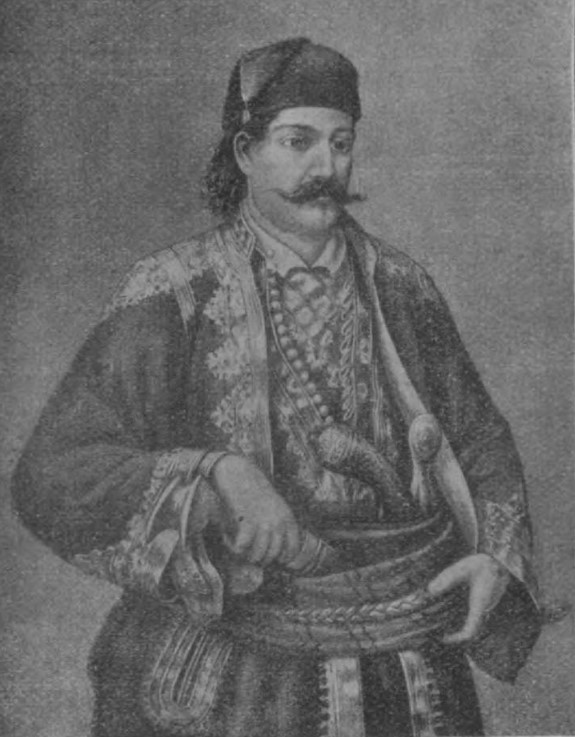
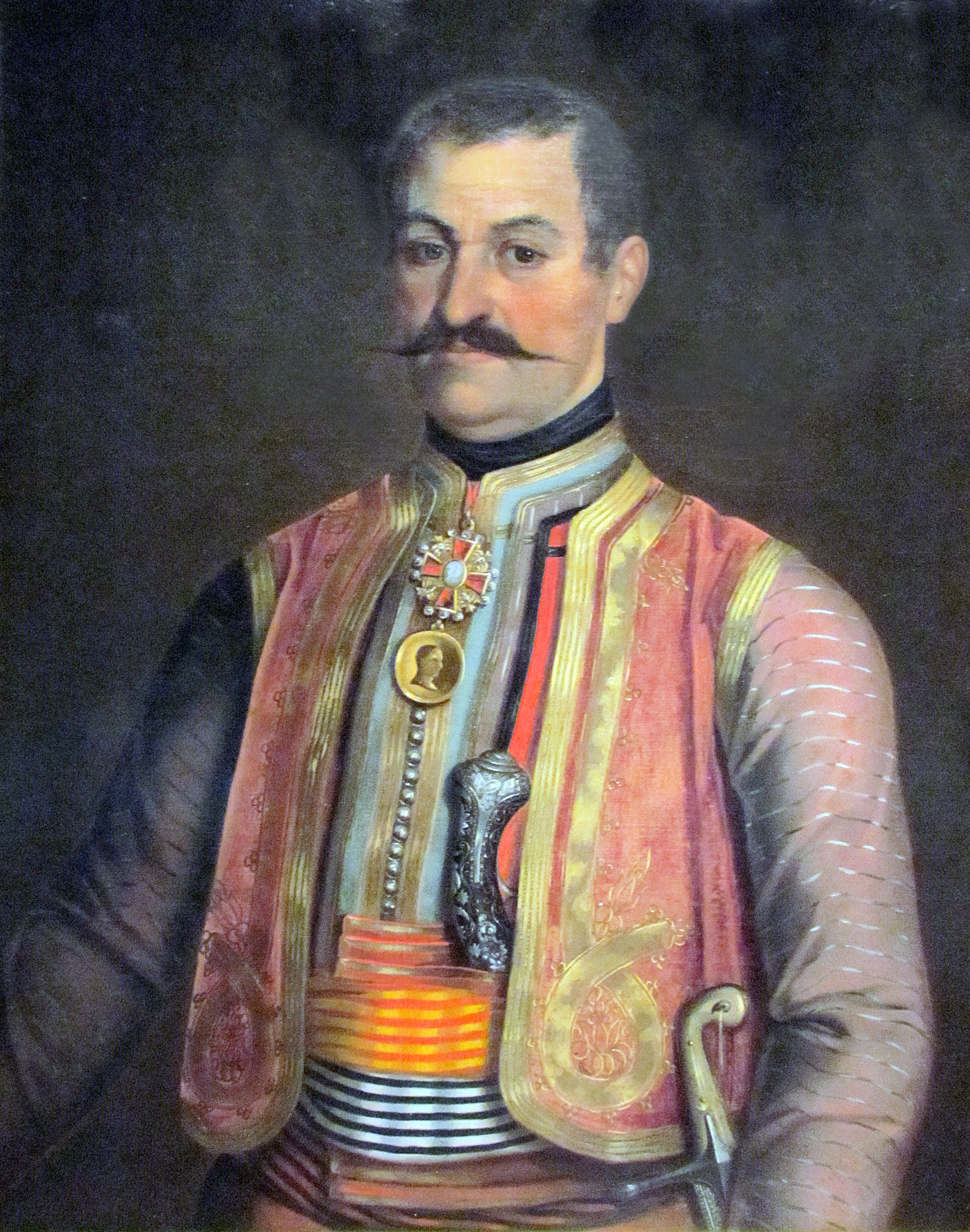
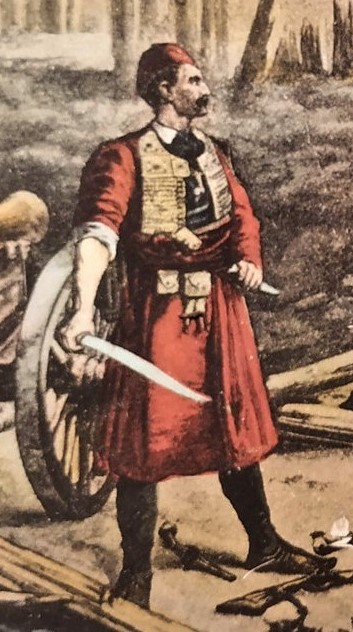
Several of the most important rebel leaders were present.
- Karađorđe, supreme commander.
- Janko Katić, second-in-command.
- Matija Nenadović, commander in Valjevo nahiya.
- Sima Marković, commander in Belgrade nahiya.
- Mladen Milovanović, influential merchant.
- Aleksa and Mihailo Lazarević from Šopić.
- Pavle Popović from Vranić.
- Juriša Mihailović from Grabovac.
- Petar Erić from Zvečka.
- Đorđe Milovanović from Železnik.
- Radoje Trnavac from Ranilović.
- Rista Radoičić from Blaznava.
- Tanasko Rajić from Stragari.
- Ranko Radić from Nemenikuće.
- Raka Levajac from Čačak.
- According to Matija Nenadović, also Antonije Ristić-Pljakić participated, and according to Batalaka, Vasa Čarapić, but these are not mentioned in the Austrian protocol.

== Meeting ==
The meeting took place on 10 May [O.S. 28 April] 1804 in the courtyard of the Zemun Military Command. Austrian officers mediated in the discussions, including oberst Andra Stojićević, major Paul von Mitesser, oberst Georg Tomerlin, quarantine director Inercil and translator Fleischhackel. The Dahije delegation entered the courtyard first, and Geneyne spoke of the friendship of the Austrian and Ottoman courts. According to the protocol of the meeting, 16 Serbian representatives then entered the meeting and condescendingly greeted the "Turk" delegation. Geneyne stressed good intent and the need for agreement, upon which the Serb delegation withdrew. It returned and declared that the Serbs were loyal subjects only to the Sultan and that the Dahije's abuse had forced them to take up arms. They spoke of the made-up fines (globa) that impoverished them, the abuse by subaşi (village henchmen) and innkeepers (handžije), the rapes of their women and girls, the murder of around 1,000 leaders (starešine) and clergy, without basis. Katić, whose brother was murdered in the Slaughter of the Knezes, berated the delegation on the terror endured by the Serbs at the hands of the Dahije. A document was handed over which spoke of the abuse in detail. Karađorđe and Matija presented an armistice plan with 9 or 10 conditions, including Serbian autonomy. The points have been variously described in historiography, and include:

- Abolishment of chiflik (private land holdings) and chiflik-holders (as in Dahije abusers); the execution or expulsion of the four Dahije leaders.
- Election of a supreme knez "of all Serbs" as an intermediary between the Porte and the Serbs, with a permanent seat in the Porte.
- The Ottoman cities be garrisoned with the army and not Janissaries, and until then, the Pasha would have 1,500 Serbs under his command.
- Return of 1793–94 haraç (non-Muslim land tax) to the state and feudal tolls to the sipahi, and no extra fees. A total of 400,000 groschen. Collection of taxes through the knezes and supreme knez.
- The rayah (Christians) be allowed to trade throughout the nahiyas, whatever they like.
- Return of 1793–94 self-governing rights (internal autonomy).
- Election of knezes as representatives of the rayah, recognized by the Vizier, with the right to intervene at the kadi (Muslim judge).
- Fair trial according to law, all fines and jailtime only according to court decision. Amnesty for all Serb rebels.
- Respect for religious and national tradition, right to erect churches and monasteries, and church body autonomy. Clergy be judged by the Serb archiereus, and not Islamic judges.

Ibrahim Bey and the muhasils acknowledged that the Serbs had endured abuse, but said that this could have been discussed at the sharia courts instead of taking up weapons. They promised that the Dahije would stop the abuse and that the Serb demands from the meeting at Palanka would be met, with a ferman (decree) from the Sultan. The kadi (judge) read from a Turkish-language document (given to the Military Command) that spoke of these points, upon which the Serb delegation in unison asked who would guarantee this, and the answer was "the Pasha, all of us present, and all citizens of Belgrade". The Serbs then said "how could you give such an assurance, when you ... are under their rule ... and today when the Dahije ... unthrustworthy ... send 400 Turks to burn down Christian villages and kill Serbs ... bare beliefs are to no benefit". The Serbs would not back down until the four Dahije leaders be executed; according to Batalaka, Karađorđe and Janko demanded that the city give up the Dahije, and explicitly said that there would be no peace with the Dahije. The Turk delegation again read the points, but the Serbs did not back down on the demand that the Dahije be executed (German: exterminieren). Geneyne reappeared and suggested that the Dahije and their followers be allowed to settle in Niš or elsewhere, and the Serbs supported this, but the Turk delegation refused, it is believed (as written in the protocol), because the Dahije would not accept this. Geneyne spoke with the Serb delegation on the side and told them that their war wouldn't endure shortage of ammunition, money and food, and that their enemy could receive aid from somewhere and reverse the situation to their misfortune. The Serb delegation then made official their decision that their Belgrade blockade detachments line would set up two hours from the Sava towards the Danube, until a Sultan's ferman acknowledged the points, and that anyone crossing that line, or known to work against this, would be seen as an enemy. This was also refused by the Turk delegation. According to Batalaka, the Turk delegation condemned the Serbs, for them in a despicable manner, and a verbal conflict followed. Geneyne tried to mediate, but the Turks increasingly began to speak negatively about the Serbs, upon which the Serbs made clear that they would all rather die than let the Dahije stay in Belgrade, and that they soon, with 20,000 men would assault Belgrade to deal with the Dahije once and for all.

As no agreement could be met, Geneyne stopped the discussion, upon which the Turk delegation excused themselves to Belgrade. The Serb delegation then prepared to leave and the negotiations thereby ended, as the protocol. Karađorđe, Sima Marković and Janko Katić asked for an audience with Geneyne which they received, and they were warned to not make any disorder on Austrian soil, which they promised.

The Austrian protocol describes the end of the negotiations as the failure to reach an agreement on giving up the Dahije leaders. There are other accounts in historiography, such as according to Batalaka and Vuk Karadžić: while the meeting took place, the Dahije in Belgrade took the opportunity to attack the rebels at Vračar, and this stopped the meeting; at the end of the meeting Janko allegedly threatened the delegation with "Turks, you will see what will happen tomorrow at Vračar". According to K. Protić, the Serbs had put hay on fire at Topčider and blamed the Turks, in order to refrain from making any agreement. According to G. Desnica, in the same day, the Serbian leadership presented new conditions in negotiations at Smederevska Palanka, in 21 paragraphs. In either case, the negotiations failed and the Turk delegation returned to Belgrade while the Serbian delegation went via Austrian territory and Jakovo back to Ostružnica. The Austrian mediators were held to have very correctly treated the Serbian side, as equals.

The copy of the protocol of the meeting was held at the Serbian Royal Academy as #371.

== Aftermath ==
Karađorđe did not arrive at Zemun to negotiate, but used the opportunity at Zemun to gain friends and followers. Karađorđe and Janko were respected in the Military Frontier as Free Corps veterans and warriors. The Austrian officer corps had considerable numbers of Serbs and other South Slavs. Karađorđe petitioned the Zemun magistrate to pardon Stefan Stanošević, imprisoned since 1802, and the Slavonian–Banat appeal court eventually agreed, seen in a 14 November decision. The Serbs continued the blockade of Belgrade and other cities still in Turk hands.

In mid-June 1804, a large Serbian rebel army with the most important commanders mustered outside Belgrade. There are claims of up to 16,000 rebels, out of which 6,000 planned to assault the city. At this point, the Sultan asked the rebels to not attack and sent Vizier Bekir Pasha of Bosnia to stop the fighting between the Dahije and Serbs. Negotiations followed. The same demands given at the Zemun Meeting were given to Bekir Pasha.

== See also ==
- Timeline of the Serbian Revolution
- Assemblies of the Serbian Revolution
- Serbian Army (revolutionary)
- List of Serbian Revolutionaries

== Annotations ==
1. It is known in Serbian historiography as the "meeting in Zemun" (састанак у Земун/sastanak u Zemun, састанак у Земуну/sastanak u Zemunu).

== Sources ==
- Batalaka, Lazar Arsenijević (1898). Историја српског устанка: део први [History of the Serbian Uprising: Part One]. Vol. I. Izd. Batalakinoga fonda – via Google Books.
- Desnica, Gojko (1974). "Zemun 1804—1807" (PDF). ГОДИШЊАК. XXI. Музеј града Београда.
- Karadžić, Vuk Stefanović (1898). Jovanović, Lj. (ed.). Скупљени историски и етнографски списи Вука Стеф. Караџића, књига прва: Грађа за српску историју нашега времена: и животи најзнатнијих поглавица овога времена. Штампарија краљевине Србије.
- Nenadović, Konstantin N. (1884). Живот и дела великог Ђорђа Петровића Кара-Ђорђа [Life and Deeds of Great Đorđe Petrović Kara-Đorđe]. Vol. II (1 ed.). Vienna: У Штампарији Јована Н. Вернаја – via Google Books.
- Nenadović, Konstantin N. (1903) [1883]. Живот и дела великог Ђорђа Петровића Кара-Ђорђа [Life and Deeds of Great Đorđe Petrović Kara-Đorđe]. Vol. I (2 ed.). Belgrade: Штампа Савића и Комп. – via Archive.org.
- Novaković, Stojan (1904). Устанак на дахије 1804 [Uprising against the Dahije]. Штампано у Државној штампарији. pp. 170- – via Archive.org.
- Perović, Dušan (1976). "Osnovni ciljevi prvog ustanka". Историјски часопис. 23. Istorijski institut: 51-.
- Protić, Kosta (1893). "Ратни догађаји из првога српског устанка под Карађорђем Петровићем 1804—1813". Годишњица Николе Чупића. XIII. Državna štamparija.
- Stojančević, Vladimir (1957). "Борбе за ослобођење Београда 1804–1806 године" (PDF). ГОДИШЊАК. IV. Музеј града Београда: 111–142.
