= Hafiz Mustafa Agha =

Ottoman soldier

- Born: Mustafa; 1770; Niš
- Died: August 18, 1805; Niš
- Military career
- Allegiance: Ottoman Empire (1788–1805)
- Rank: mutesellim in Niš, kapıcıbaşı
- Units: Sanjak of Kruševac (1790s); Sanjak of Niš (–1805)
- Conflicts: Austro-Turkish War (1788–1791); Janissary revolt (1790s); First Serbian Uprising (1804–1805)

Hafiz Mustafa Agha (Turkish: Hafız Mustafa Ağa, Serbian: Хафиз Мустафа-ага; 1770–August 1805), known in historiography as Hafiz-Pasha (Hafız Paşa, Хафиз-паша, Хафис-паша), was an Ottoman commander of the Sanjak of Niš, notable for participating in the suppression of rebel Janissaries in the Sanjak of Smederevo in the 1790s and appointed the titular Vizier of the Belgrade Pashalik in 1805 in order to suppress the Serbian rebels in the First Serbian Uprising (1804–13).

Mustafa was born into a very poor Muslim family in Niš. As a young man he participated in the Austro-Turkish War (1788–1791), distinguishing himself through courage and appropriate military demeanor. He quickly advanced during the revolt of the Janissaries (who were supported by Osman Pazvantoglu) in the Sanjak of Smederevo in the 1790s, during which he served in the Ottoman unit under the command of Şaşit Pasha of Leskovac (Шашит-паша Лесковачки). He was appointed mutesellim in Niš and was also promoted to kapıcıbaşı of the Porte, a lower-ranking honorific given to frontier officers. In August 1801, Vali of Rumelia Hakki Pasha suggested that Hadji Mustafa Pasha be transferred to Niš while in his place Hafiz be put as temporary governor until the coming of an able Vali, which shows that Hafiz had great trust, but this was not done.

In March 1804, the Ottoman sultan, on the suggestion of Grand Vizier Yusuf Ziya Pasha, ordered that Bekir Pasha's mission in the Belgrade Pashalik also include Hafiz, whose mission was to cut communications between the Belgrade janissaries and Vidin and to also pacify the Serbs. In 1804, the Serb rebels had great successes and Bekir Pasha failed the mission to pacify the Belgrade Pashalik. According to some accounts, Hafiz protected the Timok–Morava roads and successfully prevented any help to the Dahije from the Vidin Pashalik. After Bekir Pasha asked to be removed from the mission to pacify the Belgrade Pashalik in April 1805, the Porte turned to Hafiz. According to descriptions, he was very energetic and ambitious, and loyal to the Ottoman Empire. He enjoyed great reputation among both Turks and Serbs, as he did not behave as a bully and ayan. If Hafiz managed to return the Belgrade Pashalik to Ottoman rule, maintain order, and pacify the Serbs, he was promised the title of Vizier of Belgrade by the sultan. On 17 April 1805 Hafiz answered the Porte about his military plans and that he accepted the mission and title. On 24 April 1805 he was titled the muhafiz of Belgrade with the rank of Vizier. He then mustered the army of the Sanjak of Niš.

Hafiz set out with a large army (according to K. Nenadović, 45,000 troops) from Niš that clashed with vojvoda Milenko Stojković near Paraćin. The reinforcements of Serbian supreme commander Karađorđe attacked the next day and the Serbs decisively defeated Hafiz Pasha, with great Ottoman casualties, at the Battle of Ivankovac (August 1805). He was wounded in the leg and retreated to Niš where he died shortly afterwards (some allege he, disgraced, poisoned himself).

== Sources ==
- Jovanović, Dragoljub K. (1883). "Црна река". Glasnik Srpskog učenog društva. 54: 187–256.
- Milosavljević, Petar (1979). "Бој на Иванковцу 1805.". Бој на Иванковцу 1805 [La bataille à Ivankovac en 1805]. Belgrade: SANU. pp. 11–66.
- Mirčetić, Dragoljub (1994). Vojna istorija Niša. Vol. 2. Prosveta.
- Nenadović, Konstantin N. (1903) [1883]. Живот и дела великог Ђорђа Петровића Кара-Ђорђа. Vol. I (2 ed.). Belgrade: Штампа Савића и Комп. pp. 101, 106, 110–111.
- Nenadović, Konstantin N. (1884). Живот и дела великог Ђорђа Петровића Кара-Ђорђа. Vol. II (1 ed.). Vienna: У Штампарији Јована Н. Вернаја – via Google Books.
- Protić, Kosta (1893). "Ратни догађаји из првога српског устанка под Карађорђем Петровићем 1804—1813". Годишњица Николе Чупића. XIII. Državna štamparija.
- Stanojević, Milica (2005). Бој на Иванковцу (PDF). Jagodina: Завичајни музеј Јагодина.

Preceded by Suleyman Pasha	Vizier of Belgrade; 24 April–18 August 1805	Succeeded by Suleyman Pasha
