= Bekir Pasha (Bosnia) =

Ottoman governor of Bosnia

Vali of the Bosnia Eyalet
- In office September 1801 – 6 January 1805
- Monarch: Selim III
- Preceded by: Vanli Mehmed Pasha
- Succeeded by: Mustafa Pasha Ismailpašić

Personal details
- Born: Ottoman Empire
- Party: Reformist

Bekir Pasha (fl. 1800–07) was an Ottoman governor with the rank of pasha who notably governed the Bosnia Eyalet as Vali from September 1801 to January 1805. He was sent by the Porte to pacify the Sanjak of Smederevo ("Belgrade Pashalik") which was caught up in armed conflict between the Serbs and the Dahije, the renegade Janissaries that had wrested the Pashalik in 1801 and ruled in tyranny.

== Career ==
Bekir spoke Turkish. He served as the muhafiz of Agriboz prior to becoming the Vali of Bosnia.

Bekir was appointed the Vali of Bosnia, with the sanjak of Herzegovina, in the first half of September 1801. He was sent with a Bosnian army to the Sanjak of Niš due to the Yamak coup (the Dahije) and murder of muhafiz Hadji Mustafa Pasha in Belgrade, in order to close the roads for food influx to Belgrade and prevent the Yamak joining up with the Vidin rebels of Osman Pazvantoglu. After some time he returned to Bosnia. He replaced Sarajevo kadi (judge) Mehmed Seid-efendija Sulejmanefendić with Selanikli Hasan-efendija on 12 July 1801. Bekir was transferred as mutesarrif of the Sanjak of Trikala in May 1802, however, his replacement for Bosnia, Gurci Hadji Osman Pasha, was afraid to go to Bosnia and was also deterred to do so, thus, Bekir remained (or was re-instated) as Vali of Bosnia in June 1802.

=== Serbian uprising ===
When the Serbian uprising against the Dahije broke out in the Sanjak of Smederevo ("Belgrade Pashalik"), Bekir Pasha was the Vizier of Bosnia. In 1804, the titular Ottoman governor in Belgrade was Agha Hasan Pasha, who was pretendedly recognized as such by the Serbian rebel leadership. The Dahije were the true rulers of the Belgrade Pashalik, and Hasan Pasha had no powers nor influence. Among exiled Ottoman officials of Hadji Mustafa Pasha's office (the Belgrade Vizier who treated the Serbs good and was murdered by the Dahije), the former sipahi (noble cavalry) in Serbia, were defterdar (financial minister) Hasan Bey, kethüda (assistant) Veli Efendi and Ibrahim Bey Vidajić from Zvornik, who wrote accusations to the Porte regarding the Dahije. The Dahije in turn sent Muhasil Suleyman Agha to the Porte to defend them and accuse the Serbs.

Bekir was given the mission to pacify the Pashalik, to stop the fighting between the Dahije and Serbs. In March 1804, the Ottoman sultan, on the suggestion of Grand Vizier Yusuf Ziya Pasha, ordered that Bekir Pasha's mission in the Belgrade Pashalik also include Hafiz Mustafa Agha, a mutesellim (mayor) in Niš, whose mission was to cut communications between the Belgrade janissaries and Vidin (held by Osman Pazvantoglu) and to also pacify the Serbs. After the Serbian conquest of Požarevac (late May 1804), Bekir Pasha crossed the Drina from Bosnia and fought with Đorđe Ćurčija's unit in Mačva and West Serbia, according to M. Milićević. In mid-June 1804, a large Serbian rebel army with the most important commanders mustered outside Belgrade. There are claims of up to 16,000 rebels, out of which 6,000 planned to assault the city. At this point, the Sultan issued a ferman (decree) to supreme commander Karađorđe to not attack the city, as the Sultan had sent for an Ottoman Bosnian army to aid the rebels against the Dahije. The rebels aborted the assault.

=== Mission in Belgrade ===
Bekir met with the Serbian leadership and promised Karađorđe improvements and agreed to have the Dahije leaders assassinated. Fearing conspiracy, the Dahije leaders had escaped Belgrade on chaikas down the Danube to Adakale. According to K. Nenadović, it was believed that Bekir had in fact allowed the four leaders to secretly leave. Bekir arrived at Belgrade on 12 July 1804. One of Bekir Pasha's letters was saved in the Nenadović family, and in it he promises that the Serbs would have a better life than during even Hadji Mustafa Pasha's tenure, but a review shows that no real guarantees were made. After his arrival, Muhasil Suleyman Agha (now Suleyman Pasha) arrived from Constantinople and replaced Agha Hasan Pasha as Vizier of Belgrade. A ceasefire followed Bekir's arrival, and Bekir stayed for four months and returned to Bosnia in October 1804. The Serbs were unfortunately for them forced to supply Bekir's army, Gušanac's mercenaries, and Suleiman's servants, but this was not the case for long. As Bekir believed he had suppressed the rebellion, he asked Karađorđe to disperse the rebels and go home in peace. The rebel leadership sent a delegation to Bekir with conditions for peace and progression in the Pashalik, which Bekir promised to do his best with at the Porte. The rebels further demanded that apart from an Ottoman guarantee, they wanted an Austrian guarantee, which Bekir took as an insult against the Ottoman Empire and refused. The Serbs decided to continue the fight for liberation. Gušanac's mercenaries, numbering some 1,000, were still present and posed a threat to the Serbs, as they were capable of doing the same damage to them as the Dahije had done earlier. Bekir was extorted by Gušanac, who wanted pay for warring against the Serbs and would not let him leave Belgrade; Bekir had no money to pay and instead asked the Serbs to pay Gušanac some 200,000 groschen, of which half was paid up front and the rest was vouched for by Recep Agha, the nephew of commander Ibrahim Agha of Adakale, in the name of the Serbs.

In early November 1804 Bekir told the Serbian leadership that he would forward their requirements to the Porte and support them. Due to strained relations in the Bosnian–Serbian frontier, Bekir Pasha was ordered in December 1804 to muster an army against the Serbs. Bekir served as Vizier of Bosnia until 6 January 1805. He was succeeded by Mustafa Pasha Ismailpašić (t. 6 January 1805 – 25 March 1806).

=== 1805–1807 ===
The new Vizier Ismailpašić ordered for the mobilization of all of the Ottoman Bosnian army at Podrinje. Ismailpašić appointed Mustafa Pasha, the mutesarrif of Zvornik, as the general of the campaign, with deputies Hadji Sali Bey of Srebrenica, Sinan Pasha Sijerčić of Goražde, Mehmed Agha of Višegrad, and Sarajevo Janissary başağa Memiš-aga Mačković. They were subsequently accompanied by Hasan Pasha of Banja Luka, Bayraktar Ali from Prusce, the mutesarrif of Klis Suleyman Pasha, Ibrahim Agha from Kobaš, and Mahmud Agha from Jezero. Bekir appointed Sulejman Pasha Skopljak his deputy and set out with 3,000 troops in springtime 1805 from Zvornik into Serbia, tasked with opening the Contantinople–Sarajevo road and prevent the connection between the Serbian rebels and the rebels in the Sarajevo area. In the beginning of 1805, when the Bosnian Serbs awaited a Serbian rebel attack to join in on, the Serbian army was concentrated towards the Drina area.

In 1804, the Serb rebels had great successes and Bekir Pasha failed the mission to pacify the Belgrade Pashalik. After Bekir Pasha asked to be removed from the mission to pacify the Belgrade Pashalik in April 1805, the Porte turned to Hafiz, who accepted the mission and was made titular muhafiz of Belgrade with the rank of Vizier on 24 April 1805.

His tenure as Vali of Bosnia ended on 6 January 1805 and he was replaced by Mustafa Pasha Ismailpašić. He next governed the Sanjak of Selanik.

Bekir Pasha was pensioned in early 1807 according to Milićević.

== See also ==
- Sulejman Pasha Skopljak, Vizier of Belgrade (1813–1815)
- Marashli Ali Pasha, Vizier of Belgrade (1815–1821)

== Annotations ==
1. Turkish: Bekir Paşa. He is known in Serbian historiography as "Bećir-paša" (Бећир-паша). Muvekkit named him Ebubekir-paša.
2. According to Stojančević he arrived on 12 July. Batalaka claimed that he arrived at the end of July.

== Sources ==
- Batalaka, Lazar Arsenijević (1898). Историја српског устанка: део први [History of the Serbian Uprising: Part One]. Vol. I. Izd. Batalakinoga fonda – via Google Books.
- Gavrilović, Andra (1904). "Сеча кнезова". Црте из историје ослобођења Србије. Belgrade: Нздање дворске књпжаре Мпте Стајпћа у Београду. pp. 7–42.
- Milićević, Milan Đ. (1888). Поменик знаменитих људи у српског народа новијега доба. Издање Чупићеве задужбине – via Archive.org.
- Milosavljević, Petar (1979). "Бој на Иванковцу 1805.". Бој на Иванковцу 1805 [La bataille à Ivankovac en 1805]. Belgrade: SANU. pp. 11–66.
- Muvekkit, Salih Sidki Hadžihuseinović (1999b). Povijest Bosne (Tarihi Diyari Bosna). Vol. 2. El Kalem, Sarajevo.
- Nenadović, Konstantin N. (1884). Живот и дела великог Ђорђа Петровића Кара-Ђорђа [Life and Deeds of Great Đorđe Petrović Kara-Đorđe]. Vol. II (1 ed.). Vienna: У Штампарији Јована Н. Вернаја – via Google Books.
- Nenadović, Konstantin N. (1903) [1883]. Живот и дела великог Ђорђа Петровића Кара-Ђорђа [Life and Deeds of Great Đorđe Petrović Kara-Đorđe]. Vol. I (2 ed.). Belgrade: Штампа Савића и Комп. – via Archive.org.
- Novaković, Stojan (1904). Устанак на дахије 1804 [Uprising against the Dahije]. Штампано у Државној штампарији – via Archive.org.
- Perović, Dušan (1976). "Osnovni ciljevi prvog ustanka". Историјски часопис. 23. Istorijski institut: 51-.
- Protić, Kosta (1893). "Ратни догађаји из првога српског устанка под Карађорђем Петровићем 1804—1813". Годишњица Николе Чупића. XIII. Državna štamparija.
- Stojančević, Vladimir (1957). "Борбе за ослобођење Београда 1804–1806 године" (PDF). ГОДИШЊАК. IV. Музеј града Београда: 111–142.
- Teinović, Bratislav (2020). "Преглед српско-турског ратовања на Дрини (1804-1815)" (PDF). Vojnoistorijski glasnik. 2: 9–35.

Preceded by Vanli Mehmed Pasha	Vali of Bosnia; September 1801–6 January 1805	Succeeded by Mustafa Pasha Ismailpašić
