= Đorđe Guzonja =

Serbian general in the First Serbian Uprising

Đorđe Milovanović
- Born: 1770s Železnik, Ottoman Empire (now Serbia)
- Died: 1817; Rudnik nahija, Principality of Serbia (now Serbia)
- Cause of death: Murder
- Military career
- Allegiance: Revolutionary Serbia
- Service years: 1804–1813, 1815
- Rank: buljubaša (1804), vojvoda and komandant (1811)
- Nickname: Guzonja ("the Buttock")
- Unit: Belgrade nahija unit
- Commands: Železnik, Belgrade blockade line, Belgrade Fortress
- Known for: Commander of Belgrade Fortress
- Conflicts: First Serbian Uprising; Second Serbian Uprising

Đorđe Milovanović (Serbian: Ђорђе Миловановић; d. 1817), known as Guzonja (Гузоња, "the Buttock"), was Serb revolutionary, a commander active in the First Serbian Uprising, rising from captain in the Belgrade nahija to general (vojvoda) and komandant commanding the Belgrade Fortress between 1811 and 1813. He participated in the Second Serbian Uprising as well, after which he worked as a cattle trader. He was murdered by an unknown assailant.

Guzonja was born in Železnik in the Belgrade nahiya, southwest of Belgrade. He had a brother named Arsenije. Guzonja had associates in Šumadija and among Belgrade Turks, and as Železnik is located by the Sava river, also in Habsburg territory of Syrmia. During the Dahije rule, they were said to have feared him. In early April, the encirclement of Belgrade was strengthened with Vasa Čarapić at Avala, Guzonja at Železnik, Miloje Trnavac and Ranko Marković around Ostružnica. Sima Marković had constructed several smaller trenches at Železnik, put under the command of Guzonja. He participated at the Zemun Meeting (10 May 1804). He was part of the Belgrade nahija army, and was ranked buljubaša (captain). In August 1808 he escorted Russian deputy Rodofinikin to meet with the "Orthodox metropolitan of Vidin" at Miroč, it turned out that it was in fact the Phanariote Soutzos dressed in monk robe. On 4 February 1811 he was appointed the warden of the Belgrade Fortress. He built a well at Dorćol called after him. He served as warden until 21 September 1813, ending with the suppression of the uprising. It is unclear where he took refuge following this. He participated in the Second Serbian Uprising in 1815. After the uprising he worked as a cattle trader. He died in the Rudnik nahija, being murdered while on the road on business, in 1817. The perpetrator was unknown.

== See also ==
- List of people of the First Serbian Uprising
- List of people of the Second Serbian Uprising
- Timeline of the Serbian Revolution
- Serbian Army (revolutionary)

== Annotations ==
1. His surname was Milovanović (Миловановић), but the variant Miladinović (Миладиновић) is also found in historiography.

== Sources ==
- Batalaka, Lazar Arsenijević (1898). Историја српског устанка. Vol. I. Izd. Batalakinoga fonda. pp. 124, 464, 465, 984 – via Google Books.
- Jokić, Petar; Milićević, M. Đ. (1891) [1852]. Причање Петра Јокића о догађајима и људима из првог српског устанка. Споменик XIV. У Државној штампарији Краљевне Србије. pp. 46–56.
- Milićević, Milan Đ. (1888). Поменик знаменитих људи у српског народа новијега доба. Издање Чупићеве задужбине – via Archive.org.
- Nenadović, Konstantin N. (1903) [1883]. Живот и дела великог Ђорђа Петровића Кара-Ђорђа. Vol. I (2 ed.). Belgrade: Штампа Савића и Комп. – via Archive.org.
- Novaković, Stojan (1904). Устанак на дахије 1804. Штампано у Државној штампарији – via Archive.org.
- Stojančević, Vladimir (1957). "Борбе за ослобођење Београда 1804–1806 године" (PDF). Годишњак. IV. Музеј града Београда: 111–142.

Military offices
Preceded by First	vojvoda and warden of Belgrade Fortress; 4 February 1811 – 21 September 1813	Succeeded by ?
