= Recep Agha =

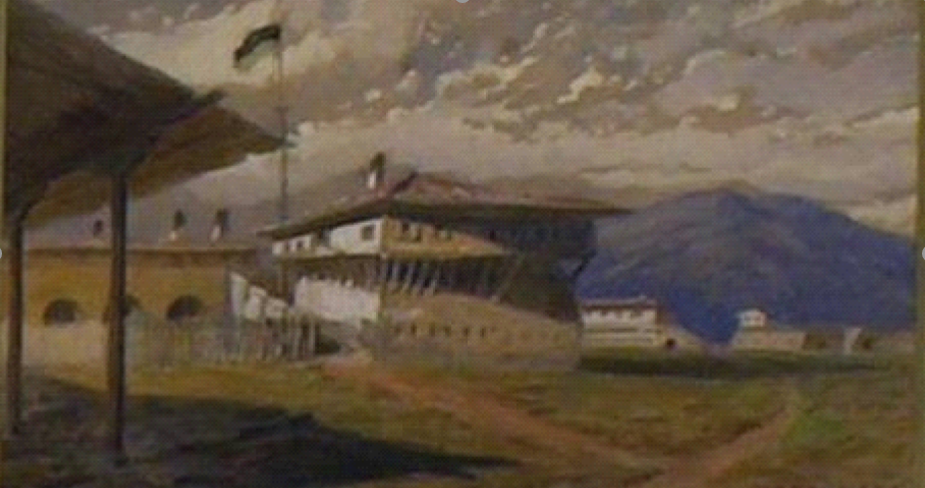
- Recep Agha's house on Ada Kaleh.
- Born: Recep; 1770; Ottoman Empire
- Died: October 1814 (aged 43–44); Ottoman Empire
- Military career
- Allegiance: Ottoman Empire
- Rank: agha, pasha

Recep Agha (Romanian: Regep-Aga, Turkish: Recep Ağa, Serbian: Redžep-aga; c. 1770–d. 1 October 1814) was an Ottoman commander of Ada Kaleh in the 1800s.

== Early life ==
Recep was the nephew of Chiosa Mustafa Agha and Ibrahim Agha, who both held offices in the city of Orsova and the surrounding area until the Austrian-Ottoman war (1788). Recep had three brothers, named Adem, Bekir and Salih. The family moved to Ada Kaleh (also known as "New Orsova") following Austrian takeover.

Ottoman officer Ismail Agha Boşnak (Serbian: Smail-paša) took Recep under his wing and put him through school, and gave his daughter Durduca to be his wife; they had a son named Rifat. He was the favorite nephew of his Uncle Chiosa Mustafa, who gave him his daughter Hakime in marriage; she bore a daughter, Safiye

== Career ==
The First Serbian Uprising broke out in February 1804 in the Sanjak of Smederevo ("Belgrade Pashalik"), when Serbs rose up against the renegade Janissaries known as Dahije. Recep, part of Bosnian Vizier Bekir Pasha's mission in Belgrade to pacify the Pashalik, sent Bekir's order to his uncle Ibrahim Agha, the commander of Ada Kaleh, to support the Serbs in executing the Dahije leaders that took refuge in Ada Kaleh. This was decided after agreement between the Serbian rebel leadership and Bekir. The Dahije leaders were executed by Milenko Stojković. Recep rose in ranks, and befriended Tudor Vladimirescu and Serbian rebel leader Karađorđe.

Ada Kaleh was surrendered to the Serbian-Russian troops on 14 September 1810. It was returned in 1812.

Recep joined the Ottoman counter-operations as a deputy of the Grand Vizier against the Serbian rebels in 1813, participating in the battles for Kladovo and Negotin, which were both retaken by the Ottomans. Serb civilians were massacred, including refugees from six neighbouring villages of Kladovo. Kladovo and Negotin came under Recep's rule, and his province was called "a little pashalik" by Vuk Karadžić. With the suppression of the Serbian uprising, Recep allegedly helped Karađorđe to flee Serbia. In the end, the ambitions of the ruler of Ada Kaleh turned out to surpass his abilities. Recep was arrested on charges of treason, allegedly for aiding Karađorđe in organizing the First Serbian Uprising and was executed by the Ottoman authorities in October 1814. Following his death, his brothers Bekir and Salih took over leadership of Ada Kaleh, resisting the Ottomans and siding with the Second Serbian Uprising. They surrendered the island to Veli Pasha.

== Recep Agha's house ==
Recep lived in a large house on the island of Ada Kaleh. The Institute of Architecture in Bucharest went to Ada Kaleh between 1962 and 1965 when the issue of Ada Kaleh's submersion was raised, as a result of building the accumulation lake from the Iron Gates. They went to evaluate the architectural monuments on the island in order to prepare for the demolition of buildings and reconstruction at the planned relocation site.

One of the monuments that were planned to be moved to the island of Simian was Recep's house, built outside the fort, to the east near the Turkish cemetery, on the north bank of the Danube. It was a two-level brick and wood building, with a large kitchen, many bathrooms, airy verandas, and a hammam (bathhouse). It was the largest house on the island. However, in 1971 the dam was complete, and the island disappeared under the waters of the reservoir. However, before the destruction, a team of scientists, led by C. S. Nicolaescu Plopsor, undertook a scientific research and rescue mission of all vestiges. From the island of Ada Kaleh, the fortifications, the mosque, the old cemetery, Regep Ağa's house, and the tomb of Miskin Baba were expected to be relocated. Only some of the architectural monuments from Ada Kaleh were relocated to the island of Simian under the leadership of C.S. Nicolaescu Plopsor. Because of his death, Regep-aga's house was not moved and ended up being engulfed by the waters of the reservoir. Due to its specific imperial-style architecture, the house became a tourist attraction known as Regep Ağa Pashalik house. Now, nothing remains of the house except a few drawings, photos, and illustrations of it, such as the painting by Austrian painter Kanitz, held at the National Museum of Serbia, in Belgrade.

There was a church in the village of Tufari, near Orsova, where, at the foundation, he was painted together with one of his brothers, wearing a turban or fez. This was the only church in Romania where Ottomans were painted. The church and the village disappeared in the waters of the accumulation lake from the Iron Gates. The writings of Ilie Salceanu reveal that Regep Ağa supported many Romanians and Serbs in the area by giving them loans and protecting them when they were in danger. As an endowment, he gave them money in gold and all the necessary material for the construction of a holy church, which they built after his death in 1815. Until such time as the renovation of this church took place in 1911, an Ottoman with a fez on his head was depicted in the church vestibule. The inhabitants, who had forgotten the story, decided that the "Turk with fez" was pagan and that it should be removed from the holy church.

In an Ottoman magazine from the interwar period, it is stated: “he was very much respected by Emperor Francis I of Austria, whom in 1810 sent him a leading general with a special delegation". Also found from “Reproductions According to the Old Notes from the Various Church Books and Protocols of the Church of Mehadia” of the priest Coriolan Buracu, is further evidence of Regep Ağa's diplomatic skills when dealing with his Austrian counterparts. On this occasion, all conversation was in Romanian, as only Romanians represented both the Ottoman and Austrian sides.

== Sources ==
- Jakovljevic, Ranko (2010). "Ada-Kaleh". Rastko.
- Smeu, Liviu (1980). "Almajul graniceresc 1773-1872" (PDF). Bucharest.
- Şuta, Daniel Grigorie (2015). "RUDĂRENII DIN ADA‑KALEH" (PDF). Revista Almatujana. 55–56 (1–2): 31–34.
- "Lozan ve Sonrasında Adakale Meselesi. 90. Yılında Lozan ve Türkiye Cumhuriyeti Uluslararası Sempozyumu, 2, 2013, 1201-1251". January 2013.
- Tara Almajuli. "Aga Regep din Rudaria" (PDF). Tara Almajuli.
