= Sanjak of Nicopolis =

Administrative division of the Ottoman Empire

Sanjak of Nicopolis Niğbolu Sancağı Никополски санджак
- sanjak of the Ottoman Empire
- 1396–1878
- Coat of arms
- Capital: Nikopol in modern day Bulgaria
- History
  - Battle of Nicopolis: 1396
  - Disestablished: 1878
Preceded by	Succeeded by
Tsardom of Vidin	Principality of Bulgaria
- Today part of: Bulgaria

The Sanjak of Nicopolis (Bulgarian: Никополски санджак Nikopolski sandzhak, Turkish: Niğbolu Sancağı) was a sanjak in the Ottoman Empire, with Nikopol in modern Bulgaria as its administrative centre. It was established out of the territories of the Tsardom of Vidin, after the Battle of Nicopolis in 1396.

== Administration ==
The earliest defter of the Sanjak of Nicopolis is composed in the mid-15th century. One group of scholars dated this defter to 1430 while another group of scholars dated it to 1479/1480. This was the first Ottoman defter which mentioned the Romani people, who lived in 431 households, or 3.5 percent of households in this sanjak.

=== Administrative division ===
In the collected notes of Evliya Çelebi (mid-17th century) the Sanjak of Nicopolis with 20 ziamets and 244 timars and income of 40,000 aspres was mentioned as one of 24 Ottoman sanjaks in Rumelia. In the mid-19th century it had 15 kadiluks.

=== Sanjak-beys ===
Bulgarian historian Rusi Stojkov believed that Skanderbeg was mentioned in 1430 Ottoman defter as a sanjak-bey of the Sanjak of Nicopolis. According to this view he was appointed to this position shortly after being chosen for the position of sanjak-bey of the Sanjak of Dibra. Halil İnalcık explained that for Skanderbeg, "this was a big promotion as Nikopol was one of the largest sanjaks of European Turkey". Strashimir Dimitrov dated this defter to 1479–80 and believed that the Iskander Bey mentioned in it was not Skanderbeg but some other person who was mirliva of Nicopolis.

During the reign of Sultan Murad II the sanjak-bey was Mehmed Bey, a son of Firuz Bey.

In March 1834 Husseyn Pasha was appointed as sanjak-bey of the Sanjak of Nicopolis and Sanjak of Vidin.

== Economy ==
The Sanjak of Nicopolis was one of six Ottoman sanjaks with most developed shipbuilding (besides sanjaks of Smederevo, Vidin, Požega, Zvornik and Mohač).
