= Habsburg-occupied Serbia (1686–1691) =

Period of Serbian history

Habsburg-occupied Serbia Habsburgisch besetztes Serbien (German)
- 1686–1699
- Top: Banner of the Holy Roman Empire (until 1804); Bottom: Habsburg monarchy (until 1804) Coat of arms
- Status: Territory of the Habsburg monarchy
- Capital: Belgrade
- Common languages: Serbian, German
- Religion: Serbian Orthodox; Roman Catholic
- Government: Military administration
- Historical era: Early modern period
  - Habsburg occupation: 1686
  - Great Turkish War: 1683–1699
  - Treaty of Karlowitz: 1699
- ISO 3166 code: RS
Preceded by	Succeeded by
Sanjak of Smederevo; Military Frontier	Sanjak of Smederevo

Habsburg-occupied Serbia refers to the period between 1686 and 1699 of the Great Turkish War, during which various regions of present-day Serbia (which were de jure Ottoman territory) were occupied by the Habsburg monarchy. In those regions, Habsburg authorities have established various forms of provisional military administration, including the newly organized Serbian Militia. By the Treaty of Karlowitz in 1699, some of those regions remained under the permanent Habsburg rule, while others were returned to the Ottoman Empire.

== History ==
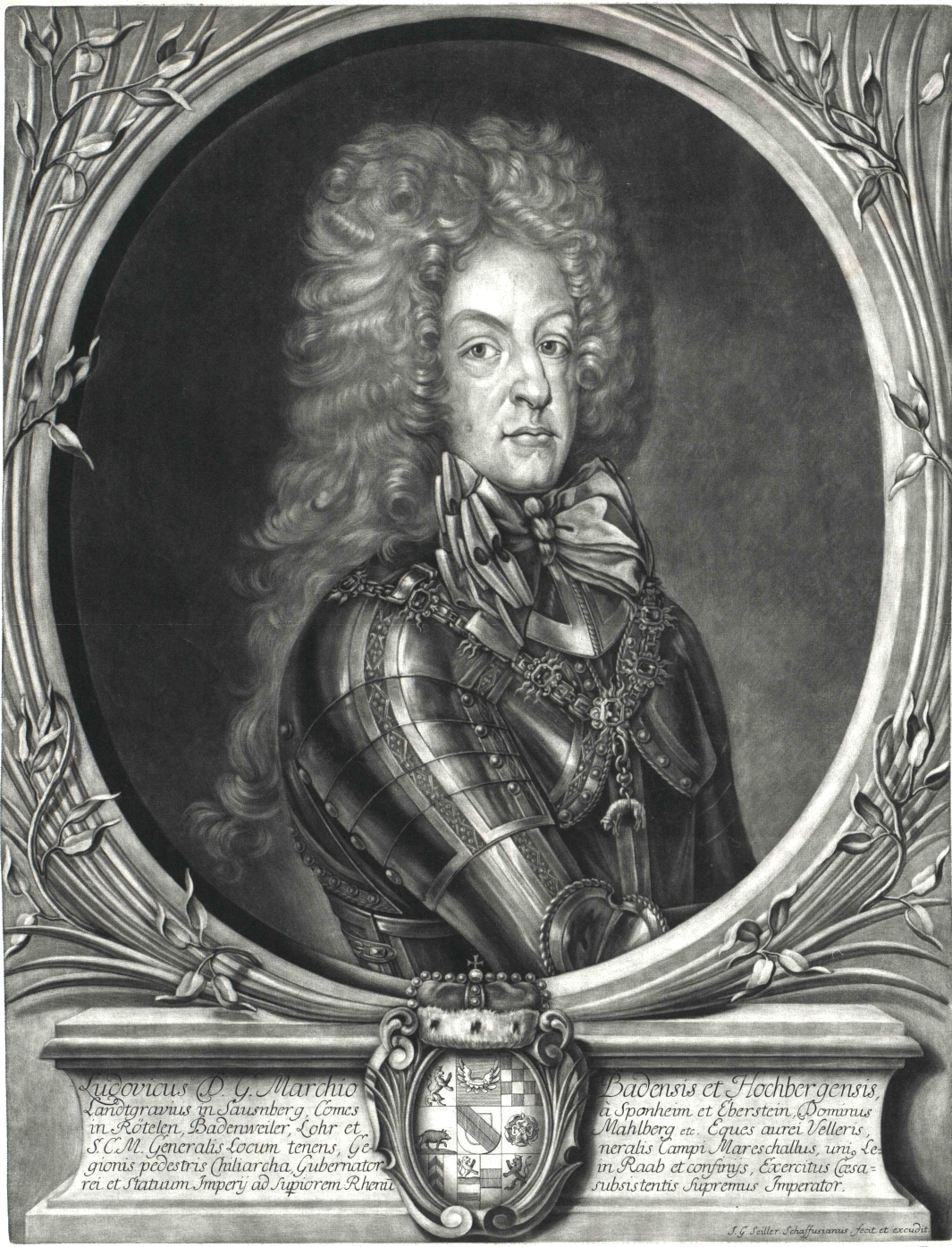
Ludwig Wilhelm von Baden (1655–1707)

In 1683, the Great Turkish War broke out between the Ottoman Empire and the Habsburg monarchy. After the victory in the Siege of Buda (1686), Habsburg forces continued their advance towards south, forcing Ottomans to retreat from the Ottoman Hungary and neighboring regions. At the same time, local Serbs, who were Christians, formed the Serbian Militia and joined with Habsburg forces against Ottomans, driving them out (fully or partially) from regions of Bačka, Banat and Syrmia (corresponding to modern Vojvodina, in Serbia).

In 1688, the Habsburg forces organized a further offensive into Ottoman Serbia, by crossing rivers Sava and Danube. Concurrently, the Serbian Militia operated throughout regions of Šumadija and Raška in central Serbia. After the victory in the Siege of Belgrade (1688), Habsburg forces continued their advance towards south, taking Niš and reaching Prizren and Skopje (1689). The Habsburgs were warmly welcomed by the locals as they saw the Christian troops as liberators. Habsburg-controlled area included much of the territory of present-day Serbia.

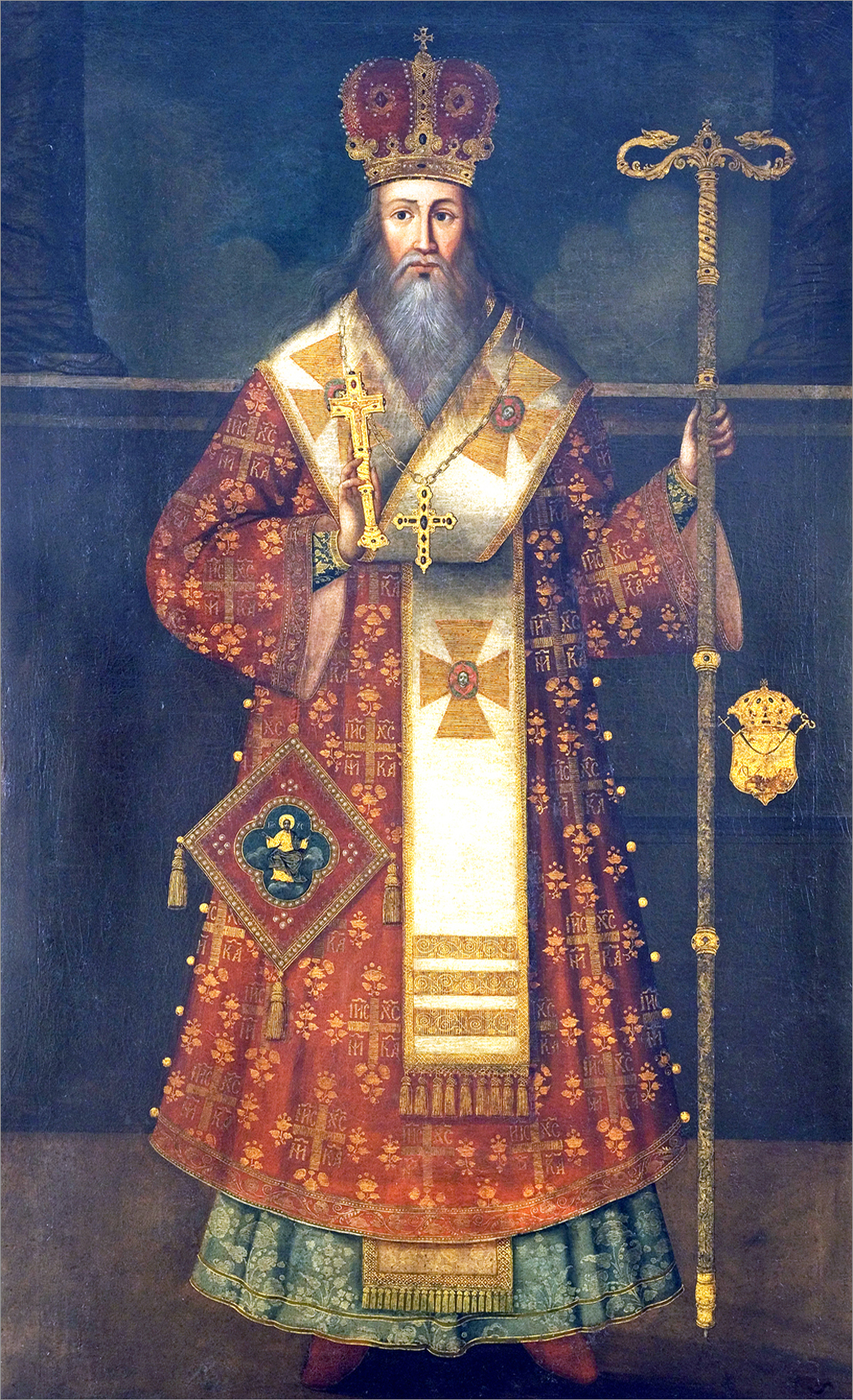
Serbian Patriarch Arsenije III Crnojević (d. 1706)

In 1690, a full-scale Ottoman counter-offensive was launched, forcing Habsburg commanders and the Serbian Militia to retreat to the north. Ottoman atrocities provoked the Great Migration of the Serbs, led by Serbian Patriarch Arsenije III, who left the Patriarchal Monastery of Peć. Arriving to Belgrade, the patriarch presided an Assembly of Serbian ecclesiastical and military leaders, who met in Belgrade in June 1690 and elected emperor Leopold I as King of Serbia. The emperor responded in August 1690, by issuing the first privilegial charter to the Serbs, thus recognizing their religious and other rights and liberties.

Ottomans undertook the Siege of Belgrade (1690) and recaptured the city in September 1690, but were stopped at the Battle of Slankamen (1691) in Syrmia.

In 1693, Habsburg forces decided to recapture Belgrade. An Imperial army, led by duke Charles Eugène de Croÿ, attacked the city and laid siege, but the Ottoman garrison organized a successful resistance and managed to repel the attack. During the next few years, the Ottomans made several attempts to recapture regions of Syrmia and Bačka, but were finally defeated at the Battle of Senta (1697) (modern Senta, in northern Serbia).

The Habsburg withdrawal from the southern territories of present-day Serbia ran in parallel with the Great Serbian Migrations into the northern regions, remaining within the Habsburg monarchy. The war ended with the Treaty of Karlowitz in 1699 (signed in Sremski Karlovci in present-day northern Serbia), under which the territory of present-day Serbia was divided between the Ottoman Empire and the Habsburg Monarchy. According to the Treaty, most of the territory of present-day Serbia remained within the Ottoman Empire, while the region of Bačka and part of the region of Syrmia were assigned to the Habsburg Monarchy.

== Habsburg commanders ==
The main Habsburg commanders in charge of operations on the territory of present-day Serbia were:

- Ludwig Wilhelm von Baden (1655–1707)
- Giovanni Norberto Piccolomini (1640–1689)
- Charles Eugène de Croÿ (1651–1702)

== See also ==
- Holy League (1684)
- Kingdom of Serbia (1718–1739)
- Habsburg-occupied Serbia (1788–1792)
- Serbian Vojvodina

== Sources ==
- Ćirković, Sima (2004). The Serbs. Malden: Blackwell Publishing. ISBN 978-1-4051-4291-5.
- Točanac-Radović, Isidora (2022). "The Great Migration of Serbs and the Question of the Serbian Ethnic and Religious Community in the Habsburg Monarchy". Migrations in the Slavic Cultural Space: From the Middle Ages to the Present Day. Łódź: Łódź University Press. pp. 15–27.
