= Sanjak of Kruševac =

Sanjak of the Ottoman Empire from 1455 to 1830

Sanjak of Kruševac Alacahisar Sancağı Крушевачки санџак
- Sanjak of the Ottoman Empire
- 1455–1830
- Capital: Kruševac
- History
  - Established: 1455
  - Final Ottoman capture of Kruševac: 1830
Preceded by	Succeeded by
Serbian Despotate	Principality of Serbia
- Today part of: Serbia

The Sanjak of Alacahisar (Turkish: Alacahisar Sancağı, Serbian: Aladža-Hisar), known in historiography as the Sanjak of Kruševac (Serbian: Крушевачки санџак), was one of the sanjaks in the Ottoman Empire with Alacahisar (modern-day Kruševac) as its administrative centre. Its Turkish name, Alacahisar, means colorful fortress.

== Background ==
Despot Stefan Lazarević, who was childless, had arranged for his nephew Đurađ Branković to succeed the Serbian throne and enter an alliance with Hungary, however, after his death, Murat invaded Serbia in 1428 claiming the land for himself. Murat took the Serbian capital Kruševac and forced Branković to continue the Ottoman vassalage. In 1451, when Mehmed II became Sultan, Despot Đurađ recaptured Kruševac and its surroundings. Mehmed II campaigned in Serbia from 1454 until 1459, when he conquered and annexed the Serbian Despotate. Kruševac (now known as Turkish Alacahisar) was taken in 1455 and immediately organized into an Ottoman subdivision.

== Administrative division ==
=== Eyalets ===
In period between 1455 and 1541 the Sanjak of Kruševac belonged to the Rumelia Eyalet. After the establishment of the Budin Eyalet in 1541 the Sanjak of Kruševac was merged into it together with several other sanjaks including the Sanjak of Smederevo, Sanjak of Pojega, Sanjak of Vučitrn, Sanjak of Zvornik etc. In 1558 the Sanjak of Kruševac was added to the Temeşvar Eyalet At the beginning of the 17th century the Sanjak of Kruševac was again part of Rumelia Eyalet.

=== Nahiyahs ===
The town of Aleksinac was mentioned for the first time in 1516 defter of the Sanjak of Alaca Hisar. In the same year there were 1,000 voynuks registered in Kruševac.

In the 16th century the Sanjak of Alaca Hișar had following nahiyahs: Kruševac (Alaca Hisar), Medveđa, Ürgüp, Zagrlata, Dubočica, Koznik, Kurşunlu, Petrus, Bovan (near modern Aleksinac), Poljanica, Kislina and Izmornik. In the 17th century this sanjak had the following kadilıks: Kruševac, Prokuplje, Medveđa, Bovan, Paraćin and Koznik.

=== Sanjak-beys ===
In 1493 the sanjak-bey of Kruševac was Ismail Bey, who participated in the Battle of Krbava Field.

Deli Hasan-pasha Suljobašić was a sanjak-bey of Kruševac since the 1720s until 1739. He managed to merge numerous small chifliks into one large estate by killing many local sipahis and zaims (leaders) without being sanctioned, despite many official investigations. In 1793 he was transferred to Prizren and then to Ohrid.

In 1789, during the Russo-Turkish War (1787–1792), Şehsuvar Abdi Pasha from İşkodra (Shkodër) was appointed sanjak-bey of the Sanjak of Kruševac. In period between 1794 and 1830 the sanjak-bey was Sašit-pasha.

== Demographics ==
=== 15th and 16th century ===
In 1455, the sanjak had 170 timars, out of which 27 were in the hands of Christians.

Ottoman sources emphasize that a wave of Vlachs herdsmen settled in the Sanjak of Smederevo and a large part of the Sanjak of Kruševac and Sanjak of Vidin. After the Ottomans conquered territories in the Pannonian Plain many families from the central Balkans move to that area which affected the Vlach-status population of the sanjaks of Kruševac and Smederevo, who lost their earlier privileges. From the beginning of 16th century, the Muslim population in Kruševac, Prokuplje and Leskovac made up 68% of the total population while until the end of the century it increased to almost 85% due to islamisation of Serbs. In smaller urban settlements such as Kuršumlija, Paraćin, Medveđa and Bovan, the Christians made up the majority of the population up until 1536. This ratio changed only by the end of the century, when these groups equalised in terms of their numbers.

In 1516, the sanjak had 320,000 inhabitants, and in 1536 due to depopulation it had 160,000-190,000 inhabitants.

According to defter counts, in 1516 there were 1,155 villages, in 1536: 1,169; in 1570: 1,082; in 1583: 1,104. The 1536 defter included the following nahiyas: Kisilina (12 villages, 153 households); Dubočica (300 villages, 7,000 households); Kruševac (216 villages, 8,000 households); Koznik (116 villages, 1,500-2,000 households); Boban (43 villages, 2,200 households); Petruš (95 villages, 1,300–3,000 households); Prokuplje (264 villages, 13,000 households); Kuršumlija (63 villages); Izmornik (30 villages); Poljanica (24 villages); Zagrlata (74 villages, 976 households).
