= Agha Hasan Pasha (Belgrade) =

- Born: 17XX; Ottoman Empire
- Died: After 1804; Ottoman Empire
- Military career
- Allegiance: Ottoman Empire
- Rank: agha, pasha, vizier

Agha Hasan Pasha (fl. 1804) was the titular Ottoman governor of the Belgrade Pashalik in 1804, during the Serbian uprising against the Dahije.

In 1804, he was the titular Ottoman governor in Belgrade, who was pretendedly recognized as such by the Serbian rebel leadership. The Dahije were the true rulers of the Belgrade Pashalik, and Hasan Pasha had no powers nor influence. He informed the Grand Vizier about events in the Serb uprising against the Dahije. Among those sent to the Zemun Meeting, held on 10 May [O.S. 28 April] 1804, to discuss peace in the pashalik between the Serbs and Dahije with Austrian mediation, were Rustem Efendi, the commander in Belgrade and divan-efendi (chief clerk) of Hasan Pasha. The discussion failed. Among exiled Ottoman officials of Hadji Mustafa Pasha's office, the former sipahi (noble cavalry) in Serbia, were defterdar (financial minister) Hasan Bey, kethüda (assistant) Veli Efendi and Ibrahim Bey Vidajić from Zvornik, who wrote accusations to the Porte regarding the Dahije. The Dahije in turn sent Suleyman Agha to the Porte to defend them and accuse the Serbs.

In mid-June 1804, a large Serbian rebel army with the most important commanders mustered outside Belgrade. There are claims of up to 16,000 rebels, out of which 6,000 planned to assault the city. At this point, the Sultan issued a ferman (decree) to Karađorđe to not attack the city, as the Sultan had sent for an Ottoman Bosnian army to aid the rebels against the Dahije. The rebels aborted the assault. Bekir Pasha was given the mission to stop the fighting between the Dahije and Serbs, and he arrived at Belgrade on 12 July 1804. After Bekir's arrival, Suleyman Agha arrived from Constantinople and replaced Agha Hasan Pasha as Vizier of Belgrade.

== See also ==
- Sulejman Pasha Skopljak, Vizier of Belgrade (1813–1815)
- Marashli Ali Pasha, Vizier of Belgrade (1815–1821)

== Annotations ==
1. Known in Serbian as Aga-Hasan-paša, Hasan-aga, and Asan-paša.

== Sources ==
- Batalaka, Lazar Arsenijević (1898). Историја српског устанка: део први [History of the Serbian Uprising: Part One]. Vol. I. Izd. Batalakinoga fonda – via Google Books.
- Gavrilović, Andra (1904). "Сеча кнезова". Црте из историје ослобођења Србије. Belgrade: Нздање дворске књпжаре Мпте Стајпћа у Београду. pp. 7–42.
- Milićević, Milan Đ. (1888). Поменик знаменитих људи у српског народа новијега доба. Издање Чупићеве задужбине – via Archive.org.
- Nenadović, Konstantin N. (1884). Живот и дела великог Ђорђа Петровића Кара-Ђорђа [Life and Deeds of Great Đorđe Petrović Kara-Đorđe]. Vol. II (1 ed.). Vienna: У Штампарији Јована Н. Вернаја – via Google Books.
- Nenadović, Konstantin N. (1903) [1883]. Живот и дела великог Ђорђа Петровића Кара-Ђорђа [Life and Deeds of Great Đorđe Petrović Kara-Đorđe]. Vol. I (2 ed.). Belgrade: Штампа Савића и Комп. – via Archive.org.
- Novaković, Stojan (1904). Устанак на дахије 1804 [Uprising against the Dahije]. Штампано у Државној штампарији. pp. 170- – via Archive.org.
- Protić, Kosta (1893). "Ратни догађаји из првога српског устанка под Карађорђем Петровићем 1804—1813". Годишњица Николе Чупића. XIII. Državna štamparija.
- Stojančević, Vladimir (1957). "Борбе за ослобођење Београда 1804–1806 године" (PDF). ГОДИШЊАК. IV. Музеј града Београда: 111–142.

Vacant Title last held by Hadji Mustafa Pasha	Vizier of Belgrade; 1804–12 July 1804	Succeeded by Suleyman Pasha
