= Hadji Mustafa Pasha =

Ottoman-Greek commander and politician

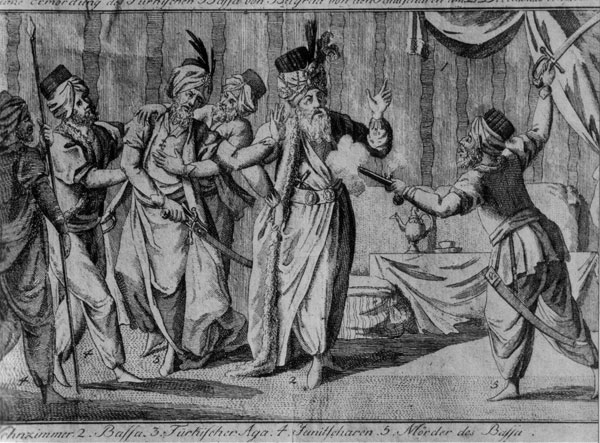

Vizier of the Sanjak of Smederevo
- In office July 1793 – 1797
- Monarch: Selim III

Beylerbey of the Rumelia Eyalet
- In office 1797–1797
- Monarch: Selim III
- Preceded by: ?
- Succeeded by: ?

Vizier of the Sanjak of Smederevo
- In office 1797 – 27 December 1801
- Monarch: Selim III
- Preceded by: ?
- Succeeded by: Hasan Pasha

Personal details
- Born: 1733 Ottoman Empire
- Died: 1801 (aged 67–68) Belgrade, Ottoman Empire
- Party: Reformist

Hadji Mustafa Pasha (1733–27 December 1801) was the Vizier of the Sanjak of Smederevo ("Belgrade Pashalik", modern-day central Serbia) from 1793 to 1801. He was murdered on 27 December 1801 by the renegade Janissaries known as the Dahije who had taken control of the sanjak.

== Life ==
Mustafa was born in c. 1733 (he was mentioned as being 60 years old in 1793). He was of Greek Muslim origin. He was surnamed Şiniklioğlu or Şinikoğlu. He fought in the Russo-Turkish War (1768–1774) and distinguished himself at the Battle of Patras (1772).

After the Austro-Turkish war (1791), the Porte sent "Mustafa Efendi" as bina-emin (construction supervisor) to the Belgrade Pashalik to renovate destroyed buildings. He befriended diplomatic translator Petar Ičko, a Greek merchant. As bina-emin, he bought wood from the Serbian knezes of the Valjevo and Belgrade nahiyas, and became acquainted. Following the Austro-Turkish war, Ebubekir Pasha governed the Sanjak of Smederevo ("Belgrade Pashalik") and in 1792 he set up the Porte's directives of getting rid of the Janissaries and holding Belgrade with sipahi and regular troops. As per old traditions, Ebubekir re-established the Christian self-governing in the knežina, a kind of Serb semi-autonomy. The Sultan and Porte wished to reform and introduce a European-styled army in place of the independent Janissaries, who went from soldiers to criminals. The rebel Pasha in the Sanjak of Vidin, Osman Pazvantoğlu, put himself as the head of the Janissary movement against reforms. Mehmed Pekmezci Pasha succeeded as Vizier of Belgrade in July 1792, when Ebubekir was transferred to the Sanjak of Bitola. Topal Ahmed Pasha was appointed the new Vizier of Belgrade in January 1793, staying at the office for six months, being remembered by the Serbs as a tyrant and haraç collector.

Hadji Mustafa Pasha succeeded as Vizier of Belgrade in July 1793.

A Janissary that remained in Belgrade and sought to become Janissary agha of all of the Pashalik, Kara-Smail, was assassinated on the order of Hadji Mustafa Pasha, which put fear in other Janissaries who fled to the Sanjak of Vidin. Some remained, such as Bego Novljanin and Ćurtoglija from Bosnia, who lived in Šabac. Mustafa Pasha was remembered positively in Serbian history, having improved the situation in the Pashalik through reforms.

Selim III issued firmans in 1793 and 1796 which granted Serbs self-governing rights. Under the new regime, taxes were to be collected by local Serbian community leaders titled obor-knez; freedom of trade and religion were granted; and ordinary Serbs began to live in peace. Unpopular Janissaries were ordered to leave the Pashalik, as they were a threat to authority. Many of those Janissaries were then employed by or found refuge with Pazvantoğlu in Vidin. Fearing the dissolution of the Janissary command in the Belgrade Pashalik, Pazvantoğlu launched a series of raids, which intensified volatility and fear in the region. Mustafa Pasha engaged mercenary forces to fight against Pazvantoğlu, but had to raise taxes to finance these forces. In order to prevent a rebellion over increased taxes, he accepted the proposal of local knezes, allowing them to establish their own forces consisting of 16,000 Serbs led by Serb officers, commanded by Stanko Arambašić from Veliko Selo. In the summer of 1797, the sultan appointed Mustafa Pasha as beylerbey of Rumelia Eyalet and he left for Plovdiv to fight against Pazvantoğlu. During the absence of Mustafa Pasha, Pazvantoğlu's forces, together with Janissaries, captured Požarevac and besieged the Belgrade fortress. At the end of November 1797, the obor-knezes from Valjevo, Aleksa Nenadović, Ilija Birčanin and Nikola Grbović, brought their forces to Belgrade and forced the besieging Janissary forces to retreat to Smederevo. In January 1798, Mustafa Pasha sent his troops, together with the militia commanded by Birčanin, to attack the Janissaries in Smederevo. However, a year later, on 30 January 1799, the Porte allowed the Janissaries to return, referring to them plainly as local Muslims.

The Janissary aghas Bego Novljanin and Ćurtoglija who lived in Šabac murdered knez Ranko Lazarević in 1800, then demanded money from his family. The knez Aleksa Nenadović, one of the most influential Serb leaders, protested to Vizier Hadji Mustafa Pasha, who had the duo attacked at the Šabac Fortress on 17 April [O.S. 5 April] 1800 by his kircali (mercenaries), leading to their flight to Bosnia.

When the Janissaries had wrested control of the Pashalik, while Mustafa was still alive, he feared for his life and his friends (among whom were Petar Ičko) planned to organize Serbian hajduks and one day muster them at Belgrade, to save Mustafa and secure his rule. On 27 December 1801, three Janissaries managed to sneak into Mustafa Pasha's private quarters and after a short exchange one of the three, Kučuk-Alija, shot Mustafa. The body of the Pasha was then paraded through the streets of Belgrade. Mustafa Pasha was murdered by the Dahije as he was a great opponent of theirs.

== Aftermath and legacy ==
The Porte, either unable to deal with the Janissaries or unwilling to do so due to politics, appointed a new Vizier and accepted the Janissaries' pledges of loyalty. Mustafa's son Dervish Bey and friends, Hasan-aga, Mehmed-aga Konjalija, Deli-Ahmet, and others, begin to conspire with Belgrade Turk citizens, sipahi, and Serbs, to defeat the Janissaries and return the life under Mustafa Pasha to the Pashalik. The first attempt broke out prematurely and failed in Požarevac in 1802. After this, the Serbs began to conspire, notably in the Valjevo nahiya under Aleksa Nenadović and in Šumadija.

== Annotations ==
1. In Serbian historiography, his name is mostly spelt Hadži-Mustafa-paša (Serbian: Хаџи-Мустафа-паша). In Turkish, his name is spelt as Turkish: Hacı Mustafa Paşa.
2. There is an account that "Şaşit Pasha" wished to return the Janissaries and was thus replaced with Hadji Mustafa Pasha.

== Sources ==
- Batalaka, Lazar Arsenijević (1898). Историја српског устанка: део први [History of the Serbian Uprising: Part One]. Vol. I. Izd. Batalakinoga fonda – via Google Books.
- Nedeljković, Slaviša D.; Đorđević, Miloš Z. (2015). "Политичке прилике у београдском пашалуку у предвечерје српске револуције (1787-1804)". Teme. XXXIX (3). Niš: 965–969.
- Nenadović, Matija (1893). Kovačević, Ljubomir (ed.). Мемоари Матије Ненадовића [Memoirs of Matija Nenadović]. Srpska književna zadruga – via Archive.org.
- Novaković, Stojan (1904). Устанак на дахије 1804 [Uprising against the Dahije]. Штампано у Државној штампарији – via Archive.org.
- Pantelić, Dušan (1949). Београдски пашалук пред Први српски устанак: 1794-1804. Belgrade: Научна књига.
- Pantelić, Dušan (1927). Београдски пашалук после свиштовског мира, 1791-1794. Српска академија наука. OCLC 39765669.
- Tričković, Radmila (1995). "Novi vek". Историја Београда [History of Belgrade] (in Serbian). Балканолошки институт САНУ [Balkan Institute of SANU]. pp. 89–141. ISBN 978-86-7179-021-5.
- Vukićević, Milenko M. (1907). Карађорђе (1752–1804) [Karađorđe]. Vol. 1. Државна штампарија Краљевине Србије – via Archive.org.
- Zens, Robert W. (2012). "In the Name of the Sultan: Haci Mustafa Pasha of Belgrade and Ottoman Provincial Rule in the Late 18th Century". International Journal of Middle East Studies. 44 (1): 129–146. doi:10.1017/S0020743811001280. JSTOR 41474984. S2CID 162893473.

Preceded by Topal Ahmed Pasha	Vizier of Belgrade; July 1793–27 December 1801	Vacant Title next held by Agha Hasan Pasha
Preceded by	Beylerbey of Rumelia; 1797	Succeeded by
