= Muhasil Suleyman Agha =

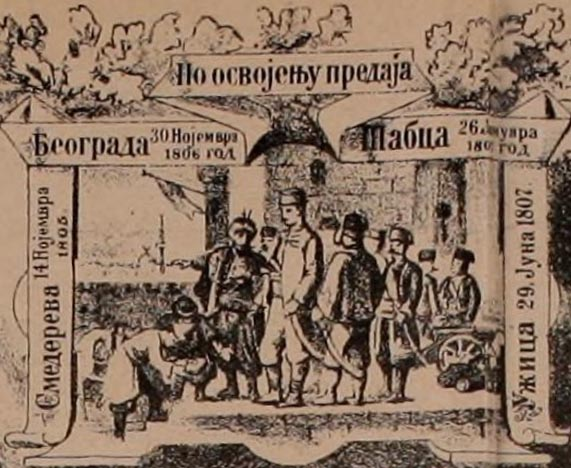
- Handing over cities to the Serbian rebels
- Born: Suleyman; 17XX; Ottoman Empire
- Died: 23 February 1807; Ottoman Empire
- Military career
- Allegiance: Ottoman Empire
- Rank: agha, pasha, vizier
- Nickname: Muhasil

Muhasil Suleyman Agha or Suleyman Pasha (fl. 1804–d. 23 February 1807) was an Ottoman official who served as muhasil in Belgrade and Vizier of Belgrade in 1804–1807, with interruption.

Suleyman Agha had served as the muhasil (Porte contact) in Belgrade, and was replaced by Ibrahim Agha. In 1804, the Vizier of Belgrade was Agha Hasan Pasha, but only in title, as the Dahije (renegade Janissaries) were the true rulers of the Belgrade Pashalik, and Hasan Pasha had no powers nor influence. Suleyman Agha wrote to the Porte on 6 April about the harsh position of besieged Belgrade. Suleyman and his successor as muhasil, Ibrahim, were both part of the Dahije–Sanjak delegation at the Zemun Meeting held on 10 May 1804, discussing the Dahije and Serbian uprising, with the mediation of the Habsburg Military Frontier command, but the negotiations failed. After complaints of some exiled sipahi about the Dahije, the Dahije sent Suleyman to the Porte to defend them and accuse the Serbs. The Porte was alarmed by the large Serbian rebel army that mustered outside Belgrade in mid-June, and sent Vizier Bekir Pasha of Bosnia with the mission to bring peace to the Belgrade Pashalik. In July, Bekir and the Serbian rebels agreed on the assassination of Dahije leaders, upon which a ceasefire followed, and in mid-August Suleyman Agha (now Suleyman Pasha), the former muhasil, was appointed the Vizier of Belgrade, replacing Agha Hasan Pasha. According to Batalaka, he arrived from Constantinople.

As was the case before, Suleyman as Vizier had no power, as kircali (mercenary) leader Alija Gušanac held the real power, as the Dahije held during the tenure of his predecessor.

Hafiz Mustafa Agha was appointed Vizier of Belgrade on 24 April 1805, following his commitment to pacify the Serbs, which Bekir Pasha had failed in. Hafiz was wounded at Ivankovac (August 1805), and died shortly after. Suleyman was reinstated as Vizier.

The Serbian rebels tricked Suleyman and his entourage after the conquest of Belgrade, destroying them outside Belgrade on 23 February 1807. Suleyman Pasha was the last Vizier of Belgrade during the First Serbian Uprising.

== Annotations ==
1. Known in Serbian as Sulejman-aga, Sulejman-paša, and Suleman-paša.

== Sources ==
- Batalaka, Lazar Arsenijević (1898). Историја српског устанка: део први [History of the Serbian Uprising: Part One]. Vol. I. Izd. Batalakinoga fonda – via Google Books.
- Gavrilović, Andra (1904). "Сеча кнезова". Црте из историје ослобођења Србије. Belgrade: Нздање дворске књпжаре Мпте Стајпћа у Београду. pp. 7–42.
- Milićević, Milan Đ. (1888). Поменик знаменитих људи у српског народа новијега доба. Издање Чупићеве задужбине – via Archive.org.
- Milosavljević, Petar (1979). "Бој на Иванковцу 1805.". Бој на Иванковцу 1805 [La bataille à Ivankovac en 1805]. Belgrade: SANU. pp. 11–66.
- Nenadović, Konstantin N. (1884). Живот и дела великог Ђорђа Петровића Кара-Ђорђа [Life and Deeds of Great Đorđe Petrović Kara-Đorđe]. Vol. II (1 ed.). Vienna: У Штампарији Јована Н. Вернаја – via Google Books.
- Nenadović, Konstantin N. (1903) [1883]. Живот и дела великог Ђорђа Петровића Кара-Ђорђа [Life and Deeds of Great Đorđe Petrović Kara-Đorđe]. Vol. I (2 ed.). Belgrade: Штампа Савића и Комп. – via Archive.org.
- Novaković, Stojan (1904). Устанак на дахије 1804 [Uprising against the Dahije]. Штампано у Државној штампарији. pp. 170- – via Archive.org.
- Perović, Dušan (1976). "Osnovni ciljevi prvog ustanka". Историјски часопис. 23. Istorijski institut: 51-.
- Protić, Kosta (1893). "Ратни догађаји из првога српског устанка под Карађорђем Петровићем 1804—1813". Годишњица Николе Чупића. XIII. Državna štamparija.
- Stojančević, Vladimir (1957). "Борбе за ослобођење Београда 1804–1806 године" (PDF). ГОДИШЊАК. IV. Музеј града Београда: 111–142.

Political offices
Preceded by Agha Hasan Pasha	Vizier of Belgrade mid-August 1804–24 April 1805	Succeeded by Hafiz Mustafa Agha
Preceded by Hafiz Mustafa Agha	Vizier of Belgrade; September 1805–23 February 1807	Succeeded by ?
Other offices
Preceded by ?	muhasil of Belgrade before 6 April 1804	Succeeded by Ibrahim Agha
