= Ebubekir Pasha (Smederevo) =

Vizier of the Sanjak of Smederevo
- In office August 1791 – July 1792
- Monarch: Selim III
- Preceded by: Osman Pasha
- Succeeded by: Mehmed Pekmezci Pasha

Governor of the Sanjak of Ohrid
- In office July 1792 – ?
- Monarch: Selim III
- Preceded by: ?
- Succeeded by: ?

Personal details
- Born: ? Ottoman Empire
- Died: ?
- Party: Reformist

Ebubekir Pasha was the Ottoman governor of the Sanjak of Smederevo ("Belgrade Pashalik") from August 1791 to July 1792 and of the Sanjak of Bitola from July 1792.

== Belgrade Pashalik ==
The war ended with the Treaty of Sistova signed on 4 August 1791, and Ebubekir was appointed the new mühafiz ("caretaker") of Belgrade. Ebubekir was resourceful and energetic. The Serbs who had fought for the Austrian side in the war were granted amnesty. Ebubekir served as the serasker of the Sanjak of Silistra. Ebubekir left Silistra via the Sanjak of Niš, arrived at and was handed over Smederevo on 20 October 1791 and arrived at Belgrade, which was handed over to him by Austrian graf Kollowrat on 23 October 1791. The Austrian troops left Belgrade for Semlin (Zemun) on 24 October 1791. Regaining northern Serbia, Sultan Selim III began reforms in the most suitable place in the empire. Ebubekir was given a commissioner to sell chiftliks and property of the old yamaks, instead of a defterdar. The yamaks (part of the Janissary corps) were prohibited to return to Belgrade due their endless violence having forced the Serb rayah into the enemy camp and they had given up Belgrade to the enemy. A firman (decree) was issued that prohibited the return of the Janissaries. The yamaks had in the past 50 years been the majority of Belgrade town (varoš) inhabitants. Only sipahi (noble cavalry) were allowed to return. Ebubekir recruited 3,000 Bosnian soldiers for the Belgrade garrison. He was ordered to send the old yamaks, who set out for Niš (and were planned to settle Sofia, Pazardzhik and Plovdiv), to the Ottoman–Russian frontier after killing three of their leaders; having killed Deli Ahmed Pasha the yamaks revolted, a rebellion breaking out in the Sanjak of Niš headed by Janissary pashas. Bišćo Zvorničanin, who collected expelled at Valjevo, threatened Ebubekir that he would destroy Belgrade with a larger army if their property was not returned. Mehmed Pekmezci Pasha succeeded as Vizier of Belgrade in July 1792, when Ebubekir was transferred to the Sanjak of Bitola. The expelled yamaks joined up with the rebels of Vidin and Niš and destroyed smaller units of Pekmezci at the Morava, then arrived at Belgrade with 1,500–2,000 men.

== Annotations ==
1. In Serbian historiography, his name is spelt Ebubekir-paša and Bećir-paša.

== Sources ==
- Nedeljković, Slaviša D.; Đorđević, Miloš Z. (2015). "Политичке прилике у београдском пашалуку у предвечерје српске револуције (1787-1804)". Teme. XXXIX (3). Niš: 965–969.
- Pantelić, Dušan (1927). Београдски пашалук после свиштовског мира, 1791-1794. Српска академија наука. OCLC 39765669.
- Tričković, Radmila (1995). "Novi vek". Историја Београда [History of Belgrade] (in Serbian). Балканолошки институт САНУ [Balkan Institute of SANU]. pp. 89–141. ISBN 978-86-7179-021-5.

Preceded by ?	serasker of the Sanjak of Silistra ?–August 1792	Succeeded by ?
Preceded by Osman Pasha	mühafiz of Belgrade (Sanjak of Smederevo); August 1791–July 1792	Succeeded by Mehmed Pekmezci Pasha
Preceded by ?	Governor of Bitola; July 1792–	Succeeded by ?
