= Pursuit of Kučuk-Alija =

Battle of the First Serbian Uprising

- Part of the First Serbian Uprising
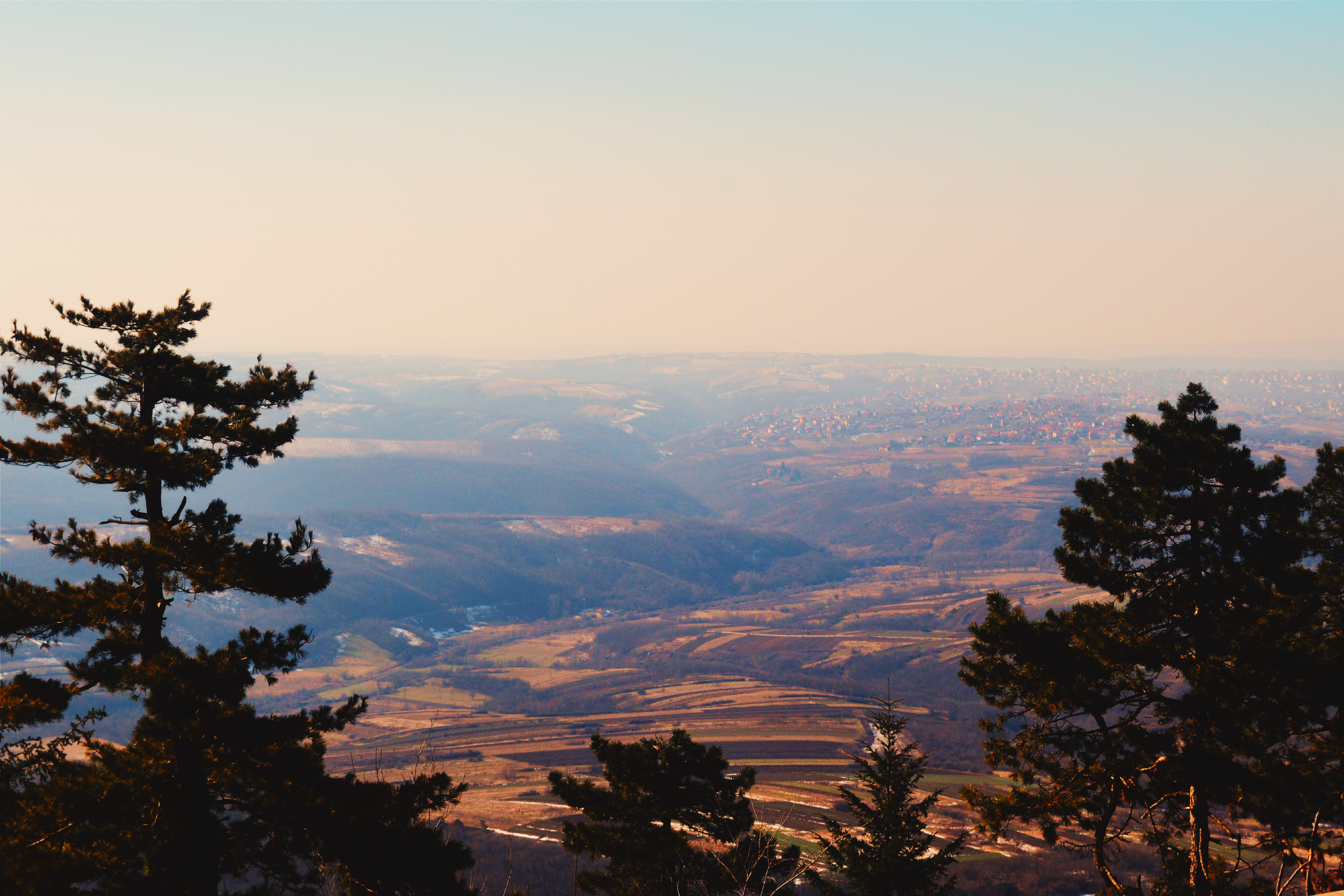
- View from Avala
| Date | 17–18 April 1804 |
| Location | Šumadija, Ottoman Empire (today Serbia) |
| Result | Serbian victory |

Belligerents
| Serbian rebels | Dahije |

Commanders and leaders
| Janko Katić (17 April); Vasa Čarapić (18 April); Karađorđe | Kučuk-Alija |

Units involved
| Karađorđe's guard (17 April); Grocka nahija (18 April) | Janissaries kırcalı Jagodina deli and local soldiers |

Strength
| 300–400 (17 April); 70 (18 April) | 1,000+ |

Casualties and losses
| 11 | 100+ |

The pursuit of Dahije leader Kučuk-Alija followed the victory at Jagodina, and included a surprise attack at Ropočevo led by Janko Katić and an ambush at Leštane led by Vasa Čarapić, outside Belgrade, on 17–18 April, both led by brothers to victims of the Slaughter of the Knezes that sparked the uprising. While Kučuk-Alija managed to return to Belgrade, much of the Pashalik was by now held in rebel hands and the important cities were held in siege.

== Background ==
The Serbian rebels destroyed a Dahije army at Kijevo, with up to 400 dead enemies, at the end of March 1804. A kırcalı (bandit mercenary) unit under Alija Gušanac was defeated near Ćuprija in the days prior, being thwarted 2–3 times from joining up with Kučuk-Alija at Jagodina and breaking through to Belgrade. Gušanac managed to break through to Jagodina in late March, owing partly to the weak Serbian defensive points around the town. Bad weather resulted in a failed siege of Jagodina in which the Serbian rebels were defeated and dispersed, around the last day of March. Karađorđe inspected the Ostružnica–Višnjica line and a 40-men rebel cavalry unit surprise attacked a Belgrade Turk contingent near Mokri Lug on 1 April. The encirclement of Belgrade was strengthened with Vasa Čarapić at Avala, Đorđe Milovanović at Železnik, Miloje Trnavac and Ranko Marković around Ostružnica. Čarapić defeated a Janissary unit of 230 men under Mula-Jusuf near Mirijevo on 15 April. After the first battle at Jagodina, the Serbian rebels mustered a new army and planned for a better attack, and succeeded with an assault on Jagodina on 16 April led by Karađorđe, killed 300, captured many, and forced Kučuk-Alija to flee. By now, only Belgrade, Smederevo and Požarevac were among important cities held by the Janissaries, all blocked by the rebels.

== History ==
After the victory at Jagodina, Karađorđe reportedly was at the Bukovik church with his personal guard of 30 men, including Stanoje Glavaš. There, he learnt that the Dahije burnt down his house, and from the smoke he saw that they moved towards Belgrade. He gathered a new unit of 300–400 in Šumadija and pursued Kučuk-Alija. Kučuk-Alija took the route via Jagodina–Kragujevac–Topola–Belosavci–Koraćica–Rogača. Karađorđe took the route via Jagodina–Kragujevac–Stragari–Bukovik–Nemenikuće. The rebels descended the Kosmaj to the Nemenikuće church, where they prayed to God for support and set out. They saw camp fires at Ropočevo and Karađorđe decided for a nighttime surprise attack led by vojvoda Janko Katić, as only the cavalry, insufficient in numbers, was present and the infantry wouldn't arrive by daytime, which would also pose a risk. Katić's brother Stevan was killed in the Slaughter of the Knezes which sparked the rebellion. A camp with the military band on the outskirts of the village was attacked with 7–10 dead bodies (and unknown numbers of bodies carried away) and those present fled down to the main camp in the village, while the rebels quickly looted what they could. The Janissary commanders set up an ambuscade and started shooting heavily, with the rebels losing one. The Serbian rebels laid down and returned fire, slowly retreating to the apple tree where Karađorđe stayed with the reserve. They went to the forest by the meyhane (restaurant) in Sopot (Sopotski han), a forest so thick that "10 of ours could counter 100 Turks". As Karađorđe's men were too tired to continue the pursuit, Vasa Čarapić was immediately informed. Kučuk-Alija's troops went for Belgrade. Alija Gušanac was not part of Kučuk-Alija's army and had already left for Belgrade following the first battle at Jagodina when the rebel army was dispersed.

At Avala, rebel commander Vasa Čarapić held an ambuscade and the part of the line of encirclement of Belgrade and watched for Dahije movement. Čarapić's brother Marko was also killed in the Slaughter of the Knezes. Kučuk-Alija knew that Čarapić was at Avala and decided to return to Belgrade via the eastern road of Vrčin and detours, ending up in Leštane above Boleč. Čarapić saw this and hurried with 70 cavalry to Leštane, with the rest of his unit, infantry, were tired of running for an hour and did not arrive in time for the ambush. Shortly after arriving, the Janissary army appeared on the road and Čarapić ambushed, leaving 60 dead soldiers and 26 horses dead. P. Jokić counted 40 dead bodies left in the field, "but many more were killed and wounded". Archpriest Matija Nenadović and historian K. Nenadović claimed at least 100 dead, and rich loot, including horses. The rebels gained rich booty and allegedly "looked like Janissaries ... covered in gold". Čarapić not only armed his own men, but also other rebels.

On 18 April Karađorđe and his men arrived at Zuce, and the next day met with Čarapić at Leštane. There were 11 rebel losses at Ropočevo and Leštane, 10 in the latter attack. Kučuk-Alija managed to return to Belgrade, with 700 men and many wounded according to foreign sources.

== Aftermath and legacy ==
Karađorđe went to Ritopek and the Sava banks, then returned to organize the encirclement of Belgrade. With Jagodina and the pursuit, the area between Kraljevo, Kruševac, Paraćin, Požarevac, Belgrade, Šabac, Lešnica, Soko and Užice was in rebel hands and the cities of Belgrade, Šabac, Smederevo and Požarevac were besieged more or less. The Belgrade city was closed, while other parts of the Pashalik continued to rise up. Kučuk-Alija began to improve the defense of Belgrade.

The ambush near Leštane entered Serbian epic poetry, such as Sarajlija's Serbijanka (1826).

== See also ==
- Timeline of the Serbian Revolution

== Annotations ==
1. The events are known as "the pursuit" (potera, gonjenje), "battles of Ropočevo and Leštane" (bitke/bojevi na Ropočevu i Leštanu/Leštanima), "surprise attack on Ropočevo" (prepad na Ropočevu), etc.
2. S. Novaković concluded that these battles took place on 17 and 18 April, using all available sources. Some other authors incorrectly use earlier dating.

== Sources ==
- Batalaka, Lazar Arsenijević (1898). Историја српског устанка. Vol. I. Izd. Batalakinoga fonda.
- Jovanović, Dobrivoje (2014) [2009]. "ПРВЕ БОРБЕ СА ТУРЦИМА И ОСЛОБОЂЕЊЕ ЈАГОДИНЕ 1804.ГОДИНЕ" (PDF). Прошлост. 3. Историјски архив Јагодина.
- Nenadović, Konstantin N. (1884). Живот и дела великог Ђорђа Петровића Кара-Ђорђа [Life and Deeds of Great Đorđe Petrović Kara-Đorđe]. Vol. II (1 ed.). Vienna: У Штампарији Јована Н. Вернаја – via Google Books.
- Nenadović, Konstantin N. (1903) [1883]. Живот и дела великог Ђорђа Петровића Кара-Ђорђа [Life and Deeds of Great Đorđe Petrović Kara-Đorđe]. Vol. I (2 ed.). Belgrade: Штампа Савића и Комп. – via Archive.org.
- Novaković, Stojan (1904). Устанак на дахије 1804. Штампано у Државној штампарији – via Archive.org.
- Protić, Kosta (1893). "Ратни догађаји из првога српског устанка под Карађорђем Петровићем 1804—1813". Годишњица Николе Чупића. XIII. Državna štamparija.
- Stojančević, Vladimir (1957). "Борбе за ослобођење Београда 1804–1806 године" (PDF). ГОДИШЊАК. IV. Музеј града Београда: 111–142.
