= Johann Georg Freiherr von Geneyne =

Johann Georg v. Geneyne
- Born: 1723; Holy Roman Empire
- Died: 13 April 1810 (aged 86–87) Győr, Austrian Empire
- Allegiance: (Habsburg monarchy) Habsburg Austria; Austrian Empire
- Branch: Cavalry
- Service years: –1807
- Rank: Feldzeugmeister
- Conflicts
- Awards: Order of St. Stephen, KC 1797

Johann Georg Freiherr von Geneyne (1723–1810) was an Austrian commander, who served as the commander-general of the Slavonian Military Frontier and Syrmia from March 1791 to July 1807. He received the Order of St. Stephen, and then freiherr status on 29 August 1797.

Geneyne was the lieutenant of the German Banat Regiment until 1783. Geneyne was promoted from oberst to generalmajor in 1783. In 1790 he was promoted to Feldmarschalleutnant. In 1799 he received diploma as feldmarschall-lieutenant. In 1804 he was mentioned as general feldmarschall-lieutenant.

In June 1807 (or July 1806) he was succeeded as commander-general in Slavonia (based in Peterwardein), after 16 years of office, by Joseph Anton von Simbschen. He died in Győr on 13 April 1810.

Military offices
Preceded by ?	feldzeugmeister of Slavonian Military Frontier; March 1791–June 1807	Succeeded by Simbschen
Preceded by ?	lieutenant of the German Banat Regiment; 1775 (?)–1783	Succeeded by ?
