= Sanjak of Smederevo =

1459–1817 Ottoman administrative unit in Serbia

Sanjak of Smederevo Semendire Sancağı Смедеревски санџак Smederevski sandžak
- Sanjak of the Ottoman Empire
- 1459–1688; 1699–1718; 1739–1788; 1791–1804; 1813–1817
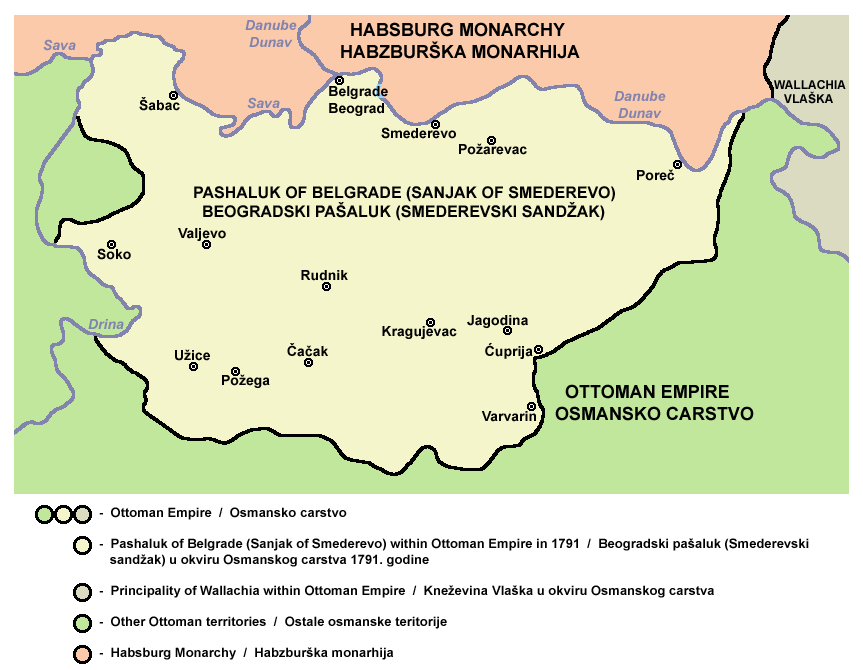
- The Pashalik of Belgrade in 1791
- Capital: Smederevo (1459–1521); Belgrade (1521–1817)
- Government
- Sanjakbey
  - 1462–1507: Ali Beg Mihaloglu (first)
  - 1815–1817: Marashli Ali Pasha
- History
  - Fall of the Serbian Despotate: 1459
  - Autonomy of the Principality of Serbia: 1817
Preceded by
| Serbian Despotate |
| Banate of Belgrade |
Succeeded by
| Habsburg-occupied Serbia (1686–1691) |
| Kingdom of Serbia (1718–1739) |
| Koča's Frontier |
| Revolutionary Serbia |
| Principality of Serbia |
- Today part of: Serbia

The Sanjak of Smederevo, (Note: (Ottoman Turkish: سمندره سنجاغی, romanized: Semendire Sancağı, Serbian: Смедеревски санџак / Smederevski sandžak)) also known in historiography as the Pashalik of Belgrade, was an Ottoman administrative unit (sanjak) centered on Smederevo, that existed between the 15th and the outset of the 19th centuries. It was located in the territory of present-day Central Serbia.

== Administration ==
=== Eyalet belonging ===
The sanjak belonged to Rumelia Eyalet between 1459 and 1541, and again between 1716 and 1717 and again 1739 and 1817 (nominally to 1830), to Budin Eyalet between 1541 and 1686, and to Temeșvar Eyalet between 1686 and 1688 and again between 1690 and 1716.

=== Borders ===
During the governorship of Hadji Mustafa Pasha (1793–1801), the administration was expanded eastwards to include the Kladovo area, until then part of the Sanjak of Vidin.

== 15th–17th century ==
The Sanjak of Smederevo was formed after the fall of the Serbian Despotate in 1459, and its administrative seat was Smederevo, at the time defended by imposing Smederevo Fortress. Ottoman sources note a migration of "Vlachs" (pastoralists) to the Sanjak of Smederevo and parts of the Sanjak of Kruševac and Sanjak of Vidin; in 1476 there were 7,600 Vlach households and 15,000 peasant households. In the 1470s, because of the fighting with the Hungarians many areas in northern Serbia were deserted. Ottomans started to colonize that area, with Vlachs as a military element, and this colonization includes entire territory of the Sanjak of Smederevo, most of Sanjak of Kruševac and Vidin. Vlachs to that area coming from Bosnia, Herzegovina, Montenegro and from Stari Vlah (İstari Eflak) region in the southwestern Serbia.

After the Ottoman conquest of Belgrade in 1521, the administrative seat of the Sanjak was moved to this city, while the name of the Sanjak remained unchanged. In this period when the Battle of Mohács took place the sanjakbey of Smederevo was Kučuk Bali-beg. Ottoman campaigns against Hungary in 16th century reduced part of the population which migrated to the Hungarian territory, according to tax registrations from 1476 and 1516 about 17% villages were abandoned. Ottoman resettle abandoned lands with populations from neighboring district which were mostly semi-nomadic Vlach groups from area of Bosnia, Hercegovina, Montenegro, and Stari Vlah in Serbia. Vlachs made up 15% of the population in Smederevo in 1516. Benedikt Kuripešić in the 16th century noted that (Orthodox) Serbs "who call themselves Vlachs" moved from Smederevo and Belgrade to Bosnia and are part of three peoples inhabiting Bosnia alongside (Muslim) "Turks" and (Catholic) old Bosniaks.

During the Great Turkish War (1683–1699), Habsburg forces took Belgrade in 1688, and seized much of the Sanjak of Smederevo, thus creating the Habsburg-occupied Serbia, but already in 1690 the Ottomans re-captured Belgrade and also reconquered the rest of the Smederevo sanjak.

== 18th century ==
In 1717, the Sanjak was again occupied by Austria, to which it was ceded in 1718 following the Treaty of Požarevac. The Sanjak of Smederevo remained under Austrian rule for 20 years, as the Kingdom of Serbia, until it was reconquered by the Ottomans following the Austro-Turkish War (1737–1739) and the Treaty of Belgrade. Belgrade, the center of the region while under Austrian rule, became neglected under the Ottomans whereas Smederevo (Semendire) regained its former role as an administrative center. Nevertheless, Belgrade eventually became the seat of a pasha with the title of vizier.

In 1788, Koča's frontier rebellion saw eastern Šumadija occupied by Austrian Serbian freikorps and hajduks. From 1788 to 1791, Belgrade was again under Austrian rule after Koča's rebellion. The Siege of Belgrade from 15 September to 8 October 1789, a Habsburg Austrian force besieged the fortress of Belgrade. The Austrians held the city until 1791 when it handed Belgrade back to the Ottomans according to the terms of the Treaty of Sistova.

The Belgrade treasury was attached to the new reform treasury since 1 March 1793. It was decided in mid-1793 that a muhassıl administer the Belgrade treasury, and this was entrusted to the new mühafiz of Belgrade, Hadji Mustafa Pasha, who thereby held all powers in the province.

In 1793 and 1796 Sultan Selim III proclaimed firmans which gave more rights to Serbs. Among other things, taxes were to be collected by the obor-knez (dukes); freedom of trade and religion were granted and there was peace. Selim III also decreed that some unpopular janissaries were to leave the Belgrade Pashaluk as he saw them as a threat to the central authority of Hadji Mustafa Pasha. Many of those janissaries were employed by or found refuge with Osman Pazvantoğlu, a renegade opponent of Sultan Selim III in the Sanjak of Vidin. Fearing the dissolution of the Janissary command in the Sanjak of Smederevo, Osman Pazvantoğlu launched a series of raids against Serbians without the permission of Sultan Selim III, causing much volatility and fear in the region. Pazvantoğlu was defeated in 1793 by the Serbs at the Battle of Kolari.

In the summer of 1797 the sultan appointed Mustafa Pasha on position of beglerbeg of Rumelia Eyalet and he left Serbia for Plovdiv to fight against the Vidin rebels of Pazvantoğlu. During the absence of Mustafa Pasha, the forces of Pazvantoğlu captured Požarevac and besieged the Belgrade fortress. At the end of November 1797 obor-knezes Aleksa Nenadović, Ilija Birčanin and Nikola Grbović from Valjevo brought their forces to Belgrade and forced the besieging janissary forces to retreat to Smederevo. By 1799 the janissary corps had returned, as they were pardoned by Sultan's decree, and they immediately suspended the Serbian autonomy and drastically increased taxes, enforcing martial law in Serbia.

Map of Sanjak of Smederevo and Serbian Uprising (1804–15)

On 15 December 1801, the popular Vizier of Belgrade Hadji Mustafa Pasha, a trusted ally of Selim III, was murdered by Kučuk Alija. Alija was one of the four leading Dahijas, Janissary commanders who were opposed to the Sultan's reforms. This resulted in the Sanjak of Smederevo being ruled by these renegade janissaries independently from the Ottoman government. Several district chiefs were murdered in the Slaughter of the Knezes on February 4, 1804, by the renegade janissaries. This sparked the First Serbian Uprising (1804–13), the first phase of the Serbian Revolution. After the Pashalik of Belgrade fell back to the Ottoman rule, various acts of violence and confiscation of people's properties took place. Islamized Serbs and Albanians especially took part in such actions. Despite suppression of the uprising in 1813 and Hadži Prodan's Revolt in 1814, the Second Serbian Uprising led by Duke Miloš Obrenović succeeded with creation of semi-independent Principality of Serbia in 1817 (confirmed with Ferman from Mahmud II in 1830), gained independence in 1878 by Treaty of San Stefano and evolved to Kingdom of Serbia in 1882. This marked the end of the Sanjak.

== Demographics ==
The population of the Sanjak of Smederevo was composed by Christians, known as Raja, and by Muslims. The latter were divided into two categories, the Erlije and the Sipahis. The Erlije were South Slavic Muslims, originating either from local converts or from Bosniaks, Albanians, or populations of other origins. The Sipahis formed the second category and played a crucial role within the Ottoman timar system. As such, the Muslim population of the Sandjak was made up mostly of villagers, but also feudals, soldiers, officials, some of whom belonged to the highest social class who worked in the Ottoman administration.

The proportion of Muslims fell considerably at the end of the 17th century and in the first half of the 18th century, after a major influx of Serbs (Christians) from outlying territories, mostly from Dinaric areas.

== Economy ==
The Sanjak of Smederevo was one of six Ottoman sanjaks with most developed shipbuilding (besides sanjaks of Vidin, Nicopolis, Požega, Zvornik and Mohač).

== Governors ==
- Ali Bey Mihaloğlu (1462–1507)
- Hadım Sinan Pasha (1507–1513)
- Yahyapaşazade Bali Bey (Serbian: Bali-beg Jahjapašić) (1513–1518) (first tenure)
- Yahyapaşazade Bali Bey (15 September 1521–1523) (second tenure)
- Yahyapaşazade Bali Bey (1524–1527) (third tenure)
- Yahyapaşazade Mehmed Pasha (1527–)
- Abdi Pasha (fl. 1787)
- Osman Pasha (fl. 1789)
- Ebubekir Pasha (August 1791–July 1792)
- Mehmed Pekmezci Pasha (July 1792–January 1793)
- Topal Ahmed Pasha (January 1793–July 1793)
- Hadji Mustafa Pasha (July 1793–27 December 1801)
- Agha Hasan Pasha (1804–August 1804)
- Suleiman Pasha (mid-August 1804–24 April 1805) (first tenure)
- Hafiz Mustafa Agha (24 April–18 August 1805)
- Suleiman Pasha (September 1805–23 February 1807) (second tenure)
- Derendeli Ali Pasha (1813), kethüda of Hurshid Pasha
- Sulejman Pasha Skopljak (1813–15)
- Marashli Ali Pasha (1815–17)

== See also ==
- List of Ottoman military governors of Belgrade Fortress
- Ottoman Serbia

== Annotations ==
1. In historiography, the period of the 18th century after the return of the sanjak in 1739 is referred to as the Pashalik of Belgrade (Ottoman Turkish: بلغراد پاشالغی, romanized: Belgrad paşalığı, Serbian: Београдски пашалук / Beogradski pašaluk). The term did not replace the official name formally.

== Sources ==
- Ćirković, Sima (2004). The Serbs. Malden: Blackwell Publishing.
- Ceribašić-Begovac, Anaid (2017). Die Muslime im Sandschak Smederevo am Übergang vom 18. ins 19. Jahrhundert - Ein Vergleich zwischen der serbischen und bosnischen wissenschaftlichen Literatur (PDF) (Thesis). University of Graz.
- Fotić, Aleksandar (2005). "Belgrade: a Muslim and non-Muslim cultural centre (Sixteenth-Seventeenth centuries)". Provincial Elites in the Ottoman Empire: Helcyon Days in Crete V. Rethymno: Crete University Press. pp. 51–75.
- Jelavich, Barbara (1983). History of the Balkans: Eighteenth and Nineteenth Centuries. Vol. 1. Cambridge University Press.
- Konstandinović, Nikola (1970). Beogradski pašaluk: severna Srbija pod Turcima : teritorija, stanovništvo, proizvodne snage. N. Konstandinović.
- Lemajić, Nenad (2020). "The Bakićes as an example of the social rise of vlach families in the early Ottoman period". Istraživanja. 31. Filozofski fakultet u Novom Sadu: 93–111.
- Oruç, Hatice (2022). "Ocaklık Timar in the Sanjak of Smederevo". In Kursar, Vjeran (ed.). Life on the Ottoman Border. Essays in Honour of Nenad Moačanin. Zagreb: University of Zagreb, Faculty of Humanities and Social Sciences. pp. 103–126.
- Popović, Marko (2018). "Siege of Belgrade in 1521 and restoration of fortifications after conquest". Belgrade: 1521-1867. Belgrade: The Institute of History. pp. 5–25.
- Самарџић, Р (1960). Београд и Србија у списима француских савременика XVI-XVIII века [Belgrade and Serbia in the writings of French contemporaries from 16th to 18th century]. Београд: Просвета.
