= Sanjak of Vidin =

Territory of the Ottoman Empire (1396–1878) now in Bulgaria & Serbia

Sanjak of Vidin Видински санджак Видински санџак Sancağı Vidin Sangeacul Vidin
- Sanjak of the Ottoman Empire
- 1396–1878
- Coat of arms
- Capital: Vidin
- History
  - Battle of Nicopolis: 1396
  - Disestablished: 1878
Preceded by	Succeeded by
Tsardom of Vidin; Serbian Despotate	Principality of Bulgaria; Principality of Serbia
- Today part of: Bulgaria, Serbia

The Sanjak of Vidin or the Vidin Sanjak (Bulgarian: Видински санджак, Serbian: Видински санџак, Turkish: Vidin Sancağı, Romanian: Sangeacul Vidin) was a sanjak in the Ottoman Empire, with Vidin as its administrative centre. It was established after the Battle of Nicopolis in 1396 out of the territories of the Tsardom of Vidin and in the mid-15th century annexed some territories that belonged to the Serbian Despotate before the Ottomans captured it.

== History ==
After the major breakthrough into the Balkans at the end of the 14th century, the Ottomans were well aware of the strategic importance of Danube and decided to capture all important fortresses on its banks. The Tsardom of Vidin, which was under control of Ivan Sratsimir, became an Ottoman vassal state in 1393, and a strong Ottoman garrison was stationed in Vidin. It was established after the Battle of Nicopolis in 1396 out of the territories of the Tsardom of Vidin Baba Vida fortress was expanded by the Ottomans who built long walls around it.

Some people from neighbouring Oltenia began migrating to the Sanjak of Vidin, especially after the Long War (1591–1606) and the hunger crisis which struck after the war.

In 1807, during the First Serbian Uprising, Serbian rebels attacked parts of the sanjak, which at the time was still under the control of Ottoman renegade Osman Pazvantoglu. The rebels' aim was to establish communication with the Russian troops in Wallachia under General Ignatiev. After the collapse of the Serbian uprising, part of the territory around Sokobanja and Svrljig recaptured from the rebels was annexed by the Sanjak of Vidin.

== Administration and demographics ==
Established after the Ottoman conquest of Nicopolis in 1396, following Sultan Bayezid's conquest of Vidin, the Vidin Sanjak belonged to the Eyalet of Rumelia, and after 1541, to the Eyalet of Buda, remaining within its composition until the fall of Buda in 1686.

At the center of the sanjak in Vidin was the seat of the metropolitanate, preserving the autonomy of this church-administrative unit under the rule of the Ecumenical Patriarchate of Constantinople even during the period of Ottoman rule. According to the census of 1454/55, the Vidin Sanjak comprised 9 smaller units—nahiyas: Banja, Svrljig, Crna Reka, Belogradchik, Gelvije (Klivje), Vidin, Zagorje, Polomje, and Timok.

According to the census of 1560, there were nine nahiyas (excluding Belogradchik and Gelvije). By the end of the 16th century, the Vidin Sanjak had a permanently established administrative division, which is believed to have been adopted from the tradition of the Principality of Vidin, given that the names of all fortresses and concurrently nahiya centers (except for Kladovo, i.e., Fetislam) are of non-Turkish origin.

Four defters were made in the Sanjak of Vidin in the period between 1483 and 1586.

From 1846 to 1864, the sanjak belonged to the Widdin Eyalet, while from 1864 to 1878, it was part of the Danube Vilayet.

== Governors ==
- Ali Bey Mihaloğlu (1460–1462)
- Osman Pazvantoglu (1794–1807)
- Mulla Pasha (1807–1811)
- Hafize Ali Pasha (fl. 1812)
- Hüseyin Pasha Aga (1833–1844, first tenure)
- Hüseyin Pasha Aga (1846–1849, second tenure)
- El-Seyyid Ali Rıza Paşa (fl. 1850)
- Hüseyin Pasha (fl. 1852)
- Abdurrahman Pasha "Samil" (1852–1855)

== Economy ==
The Sanjak of Vidin was one of six Ottoman sanjaks with the most developed shipbuilding (alongside the sanjaks of Smederevo, Nicopolis, Požega, Zvornik and Mohacs).

== Gallery ==
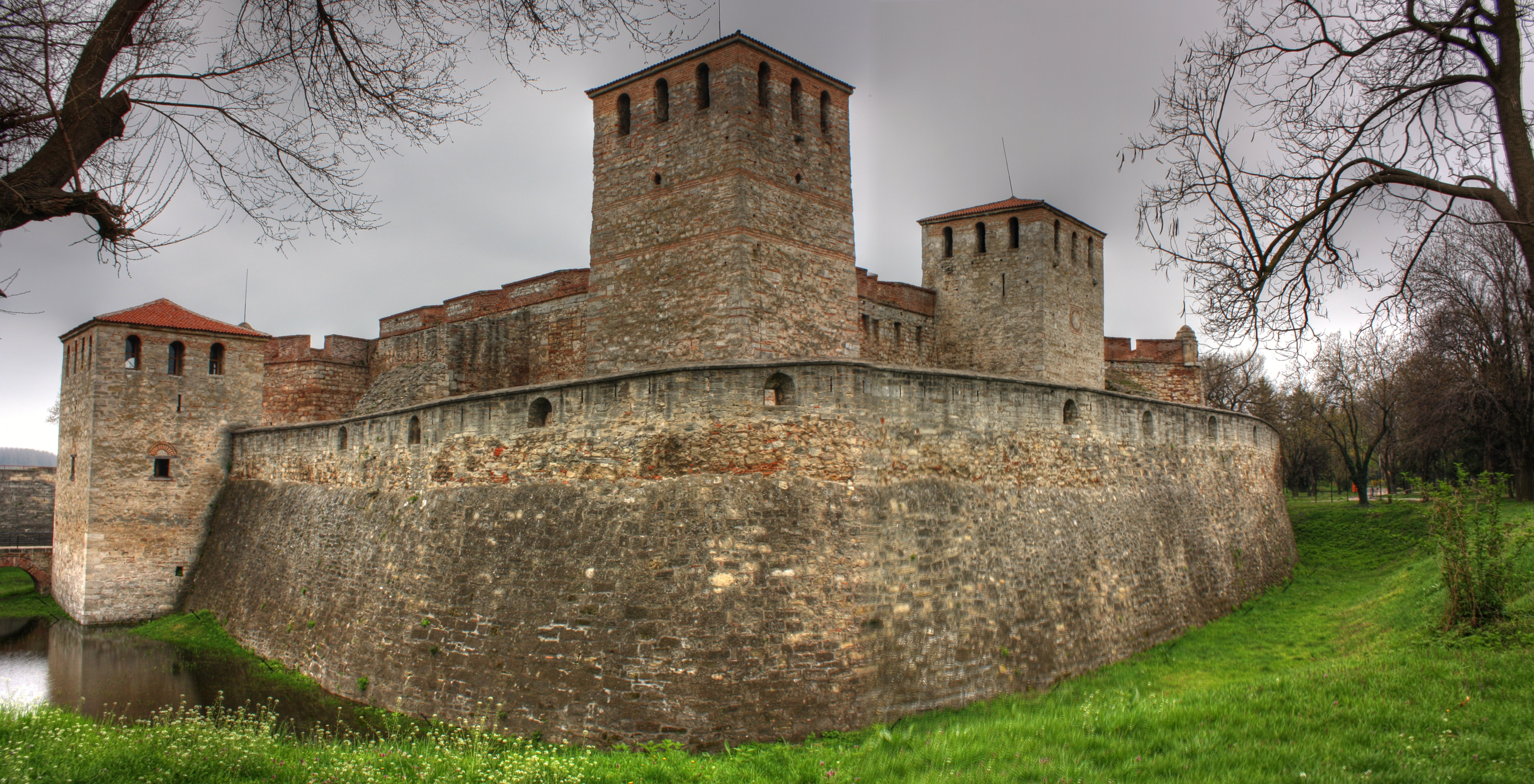
Baba Vida fortress

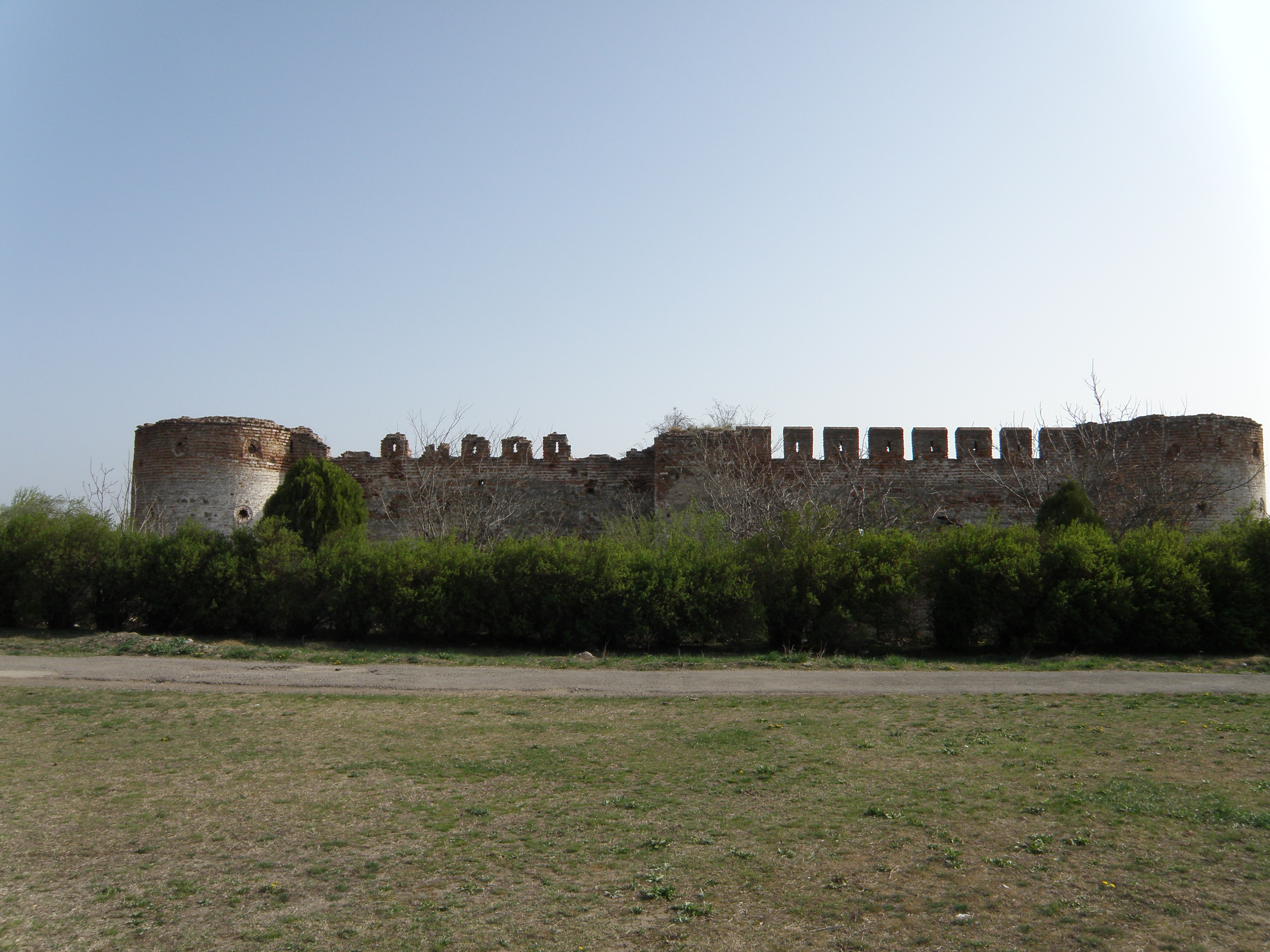
Fetislam near Kladovo

== See also ==
- Sanjak of Smederevo
- Sanjak of Niš
