= Janko Katić =

Serbian general in the First Serbian Uprising

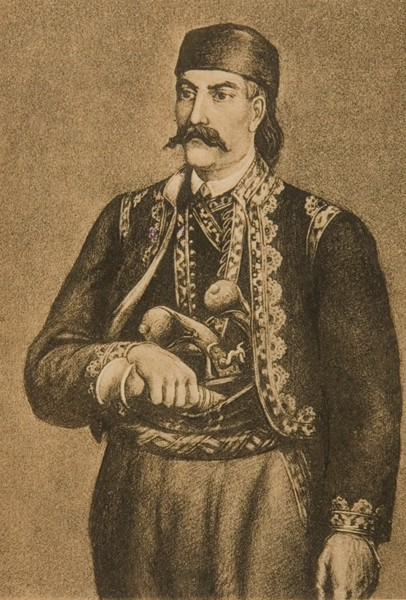
- Born: 1770s Rogača, Ottoman Empire
- Died: 1 August 1806; Krnić, Revolutionary Serbia (now Serbia)
- Burial place: Sibnica church in Rogača
- Military career
- Allegiance: Serbian militia (1790s); Revolutionary Serbia
- Service years: 1804–1806
- Rank: buljubaša (1790s), vojvoda (1804)
- Unit: Turija unit
- Commands: Turija (Kosmaj area), Belgrade blockade line
- Known for: Heroic commander, regarded second-in-command
- Conflicts: First Serbian Uprising

Janko Katić (Serbian Cyrillic: Јанко Катић; 1770s–1806) was a Serb revolutionary, and general (vojvoda) active in the First Serbian Uprising leading rebels of the Kosmaj area. A veteran of the Serbian militia that fought the Janissaries in the 1790s, he joined the uprising since the beginning. He was regarded second-in-command to supreme leader Karađorđe and is remembered as especially heroic.

== Early life ==
Katić was born in Rogača in the Belgrade nahiya of the Sanjak of Smederevo ("Belgrade Pashalik"). The village was part of the Turija knežina (Serb self-governing area) in the Šumadija region. His father Jovan settled Rogača in the mid-18th century, from either Montenegro, Herzegovina or what is today Kosovo. He had a younger brother, Marko, and a sister. His sister was kidnapped and forcibly married to a Turk in Belgrade, at which house Katić stayed for short periods and learnt Turkish. Janko was known for his good looks, riding and weapon skills. In 1791, the young Janko Katić accompanied hajduk leader Karađorđe when collecting food in the Valjevo and Šabac nahiyas for the refugees that hid in the Klještevica mountain.

Janko Katić was a militia buljubaša (captain) who fought the renegade Janissaries and Pasha Pazvanoglu of Vidin in the 1790s. He fell in love with a relative of his Turk brother-in-law, who refused to accept this and nearly killed him, his sister stopping it by standing in the way and giving time for Janko to escape. Katić moved to Avala, and then Kosmaj, becoming a hajduk (brigand). In 1801 the renegade Janissaries known as the "Dahije" wrested control of the Belgrade Pashalik. The Dahije learnt of conspiracies to overthrow them in 1803, started monitoring the Serbs and then decided to kill Serb leaders in order to thwart a rebellion against them. The Dahije gave orders to their mütesellims and others, such as innkeepers, to kill Serb notables, but still personally involved themselves. With the preparations of uprising, Janko sent his younger brother Marko to meet up with Karađorđe, a leader in Šumadija. His younger brother Marko became the leader of the Turija knežina when Janko took to the mountains.

According to K. Nenadović, Janko had an older brother, Stevan Katić, who was an obor-knez (Serb village mayor), murdered by the Dahije during the Slaughter of the Knezes. This is not mentioned by other historians.

== Uprising ==
His younger brother Marko participated at the Orašac Assembly (14 February 1804) where hundreds of influential Serbs, mostly of the Kragujevac nahiya, met and decided on an uprising against the Dahije. Janko was in hiding from the Dahije, and Marko went as his representative. Karađorđe was chosen to lead the uprising. In ten days, Karađorđe, Stanoje Glavaš and Marko Katić had burnt the inns and risen the people of and around Ranilović, Drlupa, Rogača, Stojnik, Sibnica, Venčane, Darosava, Koraćica, while Arsenije Loma did the same in the upper villages of the Rudnik nahiya. After the burning of the inns and wounding of Dahije leader Aganlija at Drlupa, Karađorđe went with his rebel army to meet with Sima Marković and Janko Katić in the Belgrade nahiya on 25 February and at the Lipe Assembly, the first siege line towards Belgrade was set up with Sima holding Železnik with his knežina army, Katić holding Kneževac with his Turija knežina army, and Vasa Čarapić holding Avala with his Grocka knežina army. The plan was to block the city, stop the Dahije from entering Serb villages, and preventing resupply. The Turija knežina chose Janko to lead them in the rebellion as knez, some time after Drlupa.

Janko Katić was placed under the command of Karađorđe. The Katić brothers participated in the takeover of Rudnik in 4–6 March 1804, upon which Janko was proclaimed the knez of Turija and vojvoda (general). Janko was with Karađorđe at Vrbica (14 March). Katić led the nighttime surprise attack at Ropočevo (17 April) during the pursuit of Kučuk-Alija. According to Karađorđe's captain Petar Jokić, Čarapić was ordered to set up a trench at Rakovica, Katić at Resnik, while Sima was at Železnik where there were several smaller trenches, in the days prior to Karađorđe's and his Jasenica troops' stay at Ostružnica during Orthodox Easter (6 May [O.S. 24 April] 1804). Janko participated in the Zemun Meeting (10 May 1804) as a Serbian rebel representative and Turkish-language translator. Allegedly, Janko threatened the delegation with "Turks, you will see what will happen tomorrow at Vračar", while another account claims he called "the whore Kučuk-Alija" to a duel at Dedino Brdo. Katić's unit accompanied Karađorđe's mustering on Vračar and taking of Požarevac in late May and taking of Smederevo in June 1804.

In mid-June 1804, a large Serbian rebel army with the most important commanders mustered outside Belgrade. There are claims of up to 16,000 rebels, out of which 6,000 planned to assault the city. At this point, the Sultan issued a ferman (decree) to Karađorđe to not attack the city, as the Sultan had sent for an Ottoman Bosnian army to aid the rebels against the Dahije. The rebels aborted the assault. Vizier Bekir Pasha of Bosnia was given the mission to stop the fighting between the Dahije and Serbs, to bring peace and security to the Belgrade Pashalik and Ottoman frontier. Janko was part of the Serbian rebel leadership that negotiated with Bekir Pasha at Bele Vode, prior to Bekir's arrival to Belgrade in July 1804. Bekir Pasha handed over knez Maksim of Guberevac, a traitor who helped Kučuk-Alija, and he was executed by Janko at Vračar.

Jakov Nenadović and Janko were sent to punish the city of Šabac for giving refuge to Mus-aga Fočić who killed many Serbs; in the winter of 1804–05, their attack failed. On 17 January [O.S. 5 January] 1805, Janko had a duel with Alija Gušanac's nephew Dema at Bele Vode. According to K. Nenadović, Karađorđe reorganized the army on 23 January [O.S. 11 January] 1805, leaving 5,000 men in the blockade of Belgrade, under Janko Katić and Vasa Čarapić. Janko and Čarapić accompanied Karađorđe in taking Karanovac in July 1805. Although mostly fighting under Karađorđe, whom he loved, Janko was among those in the leadership that sought democracy (to decrease Karađorđe's powers).

In 1806, Janko Katić and Vujica Vulićević were sent to Mačva to support the generals there. After raiding Sovljak, Katić had his men change into Turk clothing to deceive an Ottoman Bosnian unit which was successfully assaulted, leaving 67 dead enemies. In July 1806, the Ottoman Bosnian army of Vizier Ibrahim Pasha crossed the Drina. A detachment under Hasan Bey was sent for Valjevo, and Ibrahim Pasha went for Šabac. They planned to gather at Palež. In late July 1806, the troops of Jakov Nenadović, Luka Lazarević, Janko Katić ambushed and destroyed Ibrahim Pasha at Duge Njive near Krnjić. Ibrahim retreated and was pursued back to Šabac. A straggling elder Turk soldier surrendered and shot Janko Katić, who had approached on horseback and introduced himself; Katić was known as a hero and for killing many Turks in battle. Marko then personally slew that soldier. Katić's unit left the operations to bury their commander in Rogača, and when Karađorđe heard of his death after leaving Valjevo, he sent four of his guards to Rogača to take the Turija troops to Krnjić where Marko Katić was elevated to vojvoda, succeeding his brother. M. Milićević dated Janko's death to the slava (feast day) of St. Elijah (Ilindan) 1 August [O.S. 20 July] 1806.

Janko was buried at the Sibnica church in Rogača. He distinguished himself in battles and was known for his heroism, and sought to intelligently govern his knežina. He was physically described as good looking, of normal height, moderate build, and by character very eloquent, wise and intelligent, and unusually heroic. He always dressed nicely and rode a noble horse (hata) with henna on the mane, the latter entering a line in a Serbian epic poem.

Janko was succeeded as vojvoda (general) of Turija by his younger brother Marko.

He was reburied in 1935 at the Memorial Church in Rogača, the burial grounds of fallen soldiers of the Battle of Kosmaj (1914).

== Turija unit ==
The Turija knežina was organized as one of three knežina of the rebel Belgrade nahija, alongside Posavina and Kolubara, and their commanders were under the direct command of Karađorđe, according to P. Jokić. The Turija knežina unit, under his command, included the following distinguished: kapetan Mijailo Đurović from Venčane, barjaktar Nikola Nidžović from Progorelica, serdar Sima from Darosava (fell at Batočina), Milovan Šišić from Kruševica, Milosav Kujundžić from Sibnica (wounded at Lešnica, died at Zvornik), Radoje Marinković from Ranilović, Janko Jević from Drlupa, Paja Sretenović from Lisović. His younger brother Marko fought under his command and succeeded as vojvoda (general) of the unit.

== Legacy ==
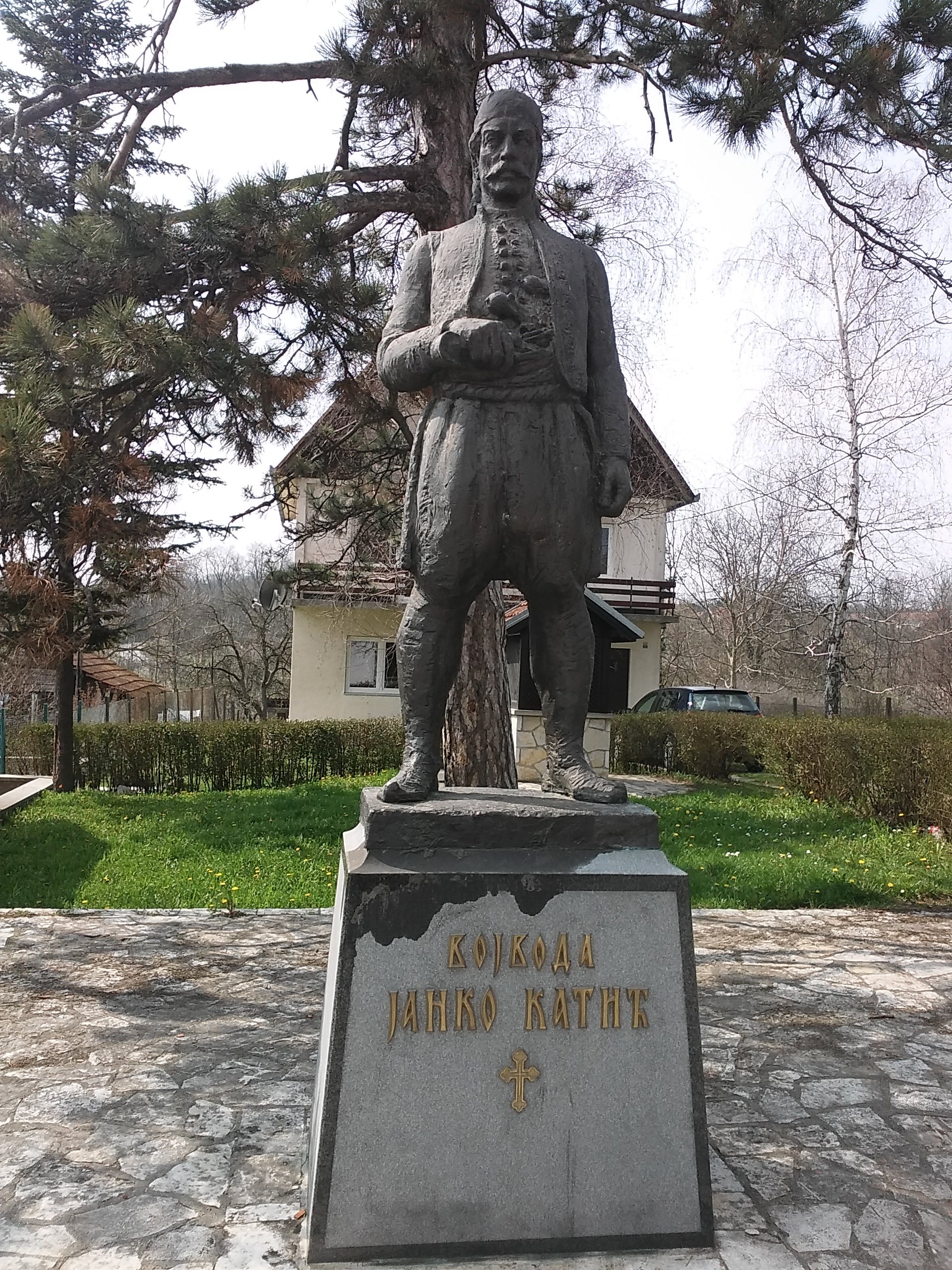
Statue in Rogača, erected in 2004, work of Milanko Mandić.

The primary school in Rogača, founded by Katić in 1804, is today named after him. In 1954, on the anniversary of the uprising, a statue was erected in the Krnić village. In 2004, on the anniversary of the uprising, a 2,4m statue by Milanko Mandić was erected in the Rogača village. A play on his life was written by novelist and screenwriter Milovan Vitezović (1944–2022). A cultural organization in Mladenovac was named after him (KUD Vojvoda Janko Katić).

== See also ==
- List of people of the First Serbian Uprising
- Timeline of the Serbian Revolution
- Serbian Army (revolutionary)

== Sources ==
- Batalaka, Lazar Arsenijević (1898). Историја српског устанка. Vol. I. Izd. Batalakinoga fonda – via Google Books.
- Desnica, Gojko (1974). "Zemun 1804—1807" (PDF). ГОДИШЊАК. XXI. Музеј града Београда.
- Gavrilović, Andra (1904). "Сеча кнезова". Црте из историје ослобођења Србије. Belgrade: Нздање дворске књижаре Мите Стајића у Београду. pp. 7–42 – via Archive.org.
- Graovac, Srđan (9 March 2018), "Карађорђе и Српска револуција 1804. године: РАЂАЊЕ СЛОБОДЕ", Agora, KCNS
- Jokić, Petar; Milićević, M. Đ. (1891) [1852]. "Imena Srba". Споменик. У Државној штампарији Краљевне Србије: 46–56.
- Milićević, Milan Đ. (1888). Поменик знаменитих људи у српског народа новијега доба. Издање Чупићеве задужбине – via Archive.org.
- Nenadović, Konstantin N. (1884). Живот и дела великог Ђорђа Петровића Кара-Ђорђа. Vol. II (1 ed.). Vienna: У Штампарији Јована Н. Вернаја – via Google Books.
- Nenadović, Konstantin N. (1903) [1883]. Живот и дела великог Ђорђа Петровића Кара-Ђорђа. Vol. I (2 ed.). Belgrade: Штампа Савића и Комп. – via Archive.org.
- Novaković, Stojan (1904). Устанак на дахије 1804. Штампано у Државној штампарији – via Archive.org.
- Stojančević, Vladimir (1957). "Борбе за ослобођење Београда 1804–1806 године" (PDF). Годишњак. IV. Музеј града Београда: 111–142.
- Vasiljević, Branka (16 February 2024). "Јанко Катић – један од покретача Првог српског устанка". Politika.
- Vukićević, Milenko M. (1907). Карађорђе (1752–1804) [Karađorđe]. Vol. 1. Државна штампарија Краљевине Србије – via Archive.org.

Military offices
Preceded by First	vojvoda of Turija; March 1804 – August 1806	Succeeded by Marko Katić
Other offices
Preceded by ?	knez of Turija; February 1804 – August 1806	Succeeded by Marko Katić
