= Marko Katić =

Serbian revolutionary (died 1810)

- Born: 17XX; Rogača, Ottoman Empire
- Died: January 1810; Rogača
- Cause of death: Assassination orchestrated by Miloje Trnavac
- Burial place: Rogača
- Military career
- Allegiance: Revolutionary Serbia (1804–10)
- Service years: 1804–10
- Rank: vojvoda (1806)
- Unit: Turija unit
- Commands: Turija (Kosmaj)
- Conflicts: First Serbian Uprising (1804–13)

Marko Katić (Serbian: Марко Катић; died 1810) was a Serbian revolutionary, and commander active in the First Serbian Uprising leading rebels of the Kosmaj area. He was the younger brother of famed general Janko Katić, upon whose death he succeeded as vojvoda of the Turija (Kosmaj) troops. He was assassinated on the order of another, conspiring commander.

== Early life ==
Katić was born in Rogača in the Belgrade nahiya. The village was part of the Turija knežina in the Šumadija region. His older brothers were Janko Katić, a militia buljubaša (captain) who fought the renegade Janissaries and Pasha Pazvanoglu of Vidin in the 1790s, and Stevan Katić, the eldest and an obor-knez (Serb village mayor). In 1801 the renegade Janissaries known as the "Dahije" wrested control of the Belgrade Pashalik. The Dahije learnt of conspiracies to overthrow them in 1803, started monitoring the Serbs and then decided to kill Serb leaders in order to thwart a rebellion against them. The Dahije gave orders to their mütesellims and others, such as innkeepers, to kill Serb notables, but still personally involved themselves. Their brother Stevan was murdered by the Dahije during the Slaughter of the Knezes in January 1804. Janko thus became a hajduk (brigand). With the preparations of uprising, Janko sent his younger brother Marko to meet up with Karađorđe, a leader in Šumadija.

== Uprising ==
Marko Katić participated at the Orašac Assembly (14 February 1804) where hundreds of influential Serbs, mostly of the Kragujevac nahiya, met and decided on an uprising against the Dahije. His brother Janko was in hiding from the Dahije, and Marko went as his representative. Karađorđe was chosen to lead the uprising. In ten days, Karađorđe, Stanoje Glavaš and Marko Katić had burnt the inns and risen the people of and around Ranilović, Drlupa, Rogača, Stojnik, Sibnica, Venčane, Darosava, Koraćica, while Arsenije Loma did the same in the upper villages of the Rudnik nahiya. Janko Katić joined the rebels upon the outbreak of uprising and fought under the command of Karađorđe. The Katić brothers participated in the takeover of Rudnik in 4–6 March 1804, upon which Janko was proclaimed the knez of Turija and vojvoda (general).

Marko fought under the command of his brother, and Katić's unit accompanied Karađorđe's mustering on Vračar and taking of Požarevac, siege of Smederevo, and with Vasa Čarapić went with Karađorđe and took Karanovac (July 1805).

In 1806, Janko Katić and Vujica Vulićević were sent to Mačva to support the generals there. After raiding Sovljak, Katić had men change into Turk clothing to deceive an Ottoman Bosnian unit and assaulted, leaving 67 dead. In July 1806, the Ottoman Bosnian army of Vizier Ibrahim Pasha crossed the Drina. A detachment under Hasan Bey was sent for Valjevo, and Ibrahim Pasha went for Šabac. They planned to gather at Palež. In late July 1806, the troops of Jakov Nenadović, Luka Lazarević, Janko Katić ambushed and destroyed Ibrahim Pasha at Duge Njive near Krnjić. Ibrahim retreated and was pursued back to Šabac. A straggling elder Turk soldier surrendered and shot Janko Katić, who had approached on horseback and introduced himself; Katić was known as a hero and for killing many Turks in battle. Marko then personally slew that soldier. Katić's unit left the operations to bury their commander in Rogača, and when Karađorđe heard of his death after leaving Valjevo, he sent four of his guards to Rogača to take the Turija troops to Krnjić where Marko Katić was elevated to vojvoda, succeeding his brother. M. Milićević dated Janko's death to 1 August [O.S. 20 July] 1806 and Marko's elevation subsequent to this.

Katić participated at Mišar (August 1806), and then in many other important battles. He accompanied Jakov Nenadović in the Bosnian campaign that began in June 1807. Planning to take Sarajevo, Nenadović chose to retreat and fortify at the Drina, as the Ottoman forces were led by experienced French officers. Katić intercepted parts of the Ottoman Bosnian army and destroyed river crossings, with many Ottoman casualties.

In January 1810, Marko Katić guested the wedding of the Maričić family in Rogača. A guest's musket went off and killed him. The perpetrator was cut into pieces. It was concluded that Miloje Trnavac had ordered the assassination, and after hiding in Austria, he was captured and brought to Luka Lazarević at Šabac and executed by two flintlocks on the order of Karađorđe. Nikola, Marko's younger brother, succeeded as vojvoda of Turija.

== See also ==
- List of Serbian Revolutionaries
- Timeline of the Serbian Revolution
- Serbian Army (revolutionary)

== Sources ==
- Batalaka, Lazar Arsenijević (1898). Историја српског устанка. Vol. I. Izd. Batalakinoga fonda – via Google Books.
- Gavrilović, Andra (1904). "Сеча кнезова". Црте из историје ослобођења Србије. Belgrade: Нздање дворске књижаре Мите Стајића у Београду. pp. 7–42 – via Archive.org.
- Graovac, Srđan (9 March 2018), "Карађорђе и Српска револуција 1804. године: РАЂАЊЕ СЛОБОДЕ", Agora, KCNS
- Milićević, Milan Đ. (1888). Поменик знаменитих људи у српског народа новијега доба. Издање Чупићеве задужбине – via Archive.org.
- Nenadović, Konstantin N. (1884). Живот и дела великог Ђорђа Петровића Кара-Ђорђа. Vol. II (1 ed.). Vienna: У Штампарији Јована Н. Вернаја – via Google Books.
- Nenadović, Konstantin N. (1903) [1883]. Живот и дела великог Ђорђа Петровића Кара-Ђорђа. Vol. I (2 ed.). Belgrade: Штампа Савића и Комп. – via Archive.org.
- Novaković, Stojan (1904). Устанак на дахије 1804. Штампано у Државној штампарији – via Archive.org.
- Stojančević, Vladimir (1957). "Борбе за ослобођење Београда 1804–1806 године" (PDF). Годишњак. IV. Музеј града Београда: 111–142.
- Vukićević, Milenko M. (1907). Карађорђе (1752–1804). Vol. 1. Државна штампарија Краљевине Србије – via Archive.org.

Military offices
Preceded by Janko Katić	vojvoda of Turija; August 1806 – January 1810	Succeeded by Nikola Katić
