= Vojvoda (Serbian Revolution) =

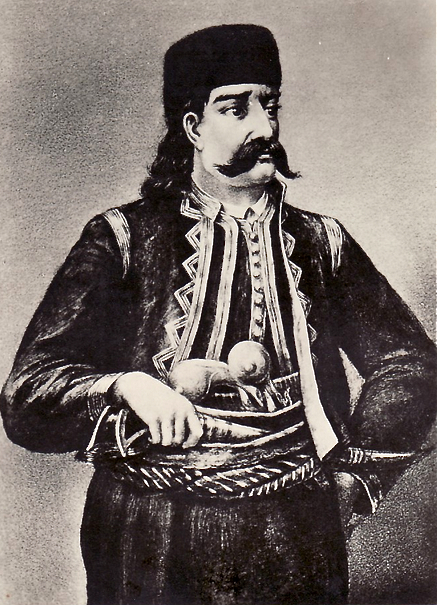
Stanoje Glavaš was a hajduk leader appointed the rank of vojvoda. He was at first asked to lead the uprising.

Vojvoda (Serbian: Војвода, lit. 'war-leader') was a military rank of the Serbian Army during the First Serbian Uprising (1804–13) and Second Serbian Uprising (1815), adopted from traditional and medieval usage. It was the equivalent of general. In the initial years, it was the highest rank, higher in rank than bimbaša and buljubaša. The vojvoda appointed and elevated ranks. The rank was not adopted into the Armed Forces of the Principality of Serbia, but it was later adopted into the Royal Serbian Army.

== Structure ==
Karađorđe, a knez in Šumadija, was appointed vožd (leader) of the uprising at the Orašac Assembly on 14 February [O.S. 2 February] 1804 (Presentation of Jesus). The leading Serbs in the Belgrade Pashalik had planned for years to rise up against the renegade Janissaries (known as Dahije) that had wrested the pashalik from the Vizier, abolished Serb self-governing rights, and finally carried out the "Slaughter of the Knezes".

At the beginning of the uprising, braver locals gathered around their starešina (chief, elder), gradually expanding with rebels joining voluntarily or through pressure. The first bands gathered around leaders such as Karađorđe, Stanoje Glavaš and Janko Katić in Šumadija, Jakov Nenadović in Kolubara and Milenko Stojković in Pomoravlje. With the expansion of the uprising, the gathering of troops was through the knez, who often also was the starešina, or another notable or merchant, such as Milan Obrenović, Mladen Milovanović, Teodosije Marićević and others. Archpriest Matija Nenadović described the starešina as coming from "the wealthiest of Serbs, who was a knez, merchant, priest, kmet (serf) or otherwise wealthy, having a good patrimony, zadruga, plenty of livestock, mills and other income" and who could gather men and arm them. The first starešine of the not yet organized army were recognized by the commoners in distinguished individuals in their midst, however, as the battles continued and the rebels became better organized, distinction through battle singled out people fit for leadership.

In the beginning, the rebel army was a militia with armed civilians, with the troop size depending on liberated territories. The military organization was territorial, divided into units of desetina ("tenth"), četa ("company") and bataljon ("battalion"), formed according to the local administrative divisions of knežina (villages under the responsibility of a knez) or nahija (a larger group of villages) which gave their names to the individual units. Senior ranks were the kaplar ("corporal"), fendrek (from "fähnrich"), kapetan or buljubaša ("captain"), podvojvoda (sub-vojvoda) and vojvoda, in the beginning of the uprising. The ranks were initially given from within the army until the strengthening of central power when commander-in-chief Karađorđe with or without the Governing Council appointed them.

Karađorđe was a strict and determined leader. Elders who were afraid to support the uprising received Turk corpses at their doorstep, scaring them into joining. He executed three villagers for feeding Turk soldiers, then appointed Miloš Stojićević the vojvoda of Pocerina, saying that if he did not follow his orders he would suffer the same fate. A veteran of the Serbian Free Corps, Karađorđe had considerable experience from his Austrian service and understood how only a regular trained army could manage against the Ottomans.

The knežina became an administrative unit in Revolutionary Serbia. All of the territory was divided into knežina, where a vojvoda was appointed to lead. Thus, Stojan Čupić was the vojvoda of Mačva, Miloš Stojićević of Pocerina, Antonije Bogićević of Jadar, Hajduk Veljko of Negotinska Krajina, Radovan Grbović of Kalubara, archpriest Milutin Ilić of Dragačevo, etc. The knežina was further divided into smaller units known as srez, which were made up of a smaller number of villages and headed by a veliki buljubaša ("great" captain), later designated kapetan (captain), that had under him several mali buljubaša ("lesser" captain). The knez of the knežina remained alongside the vojvoda, but had lesser functions than during the Ottoman era.

== List ==
Original

- Karađorđe
- Jakov Nenadović

1805 elevations

- Ilija Barjaktarović, vojvoda of Paraćin.

1807 elevations

- Hajduk Veljko, vojvoda of Krajina.
- Milisav Đorđević, vojvoda of Crna Reka.
- Anta Bogićević, vojvoda of Jadar.

1808 elevations

- Mihailo Radović, vojvoda of Zlatibor.

1809 elevations

- Milosav Zdravković, vojvoda of Resava.

1811 elevations

- Milisav Đorđević, vojvoda of Zaječar.
- Arsenije Loma, vojvoda of Kačer.
- Lazar Mutap, vojvoda of Morava.
- Milić Drinčić, vojvoda of Podgora.
- Nikola Smiljanić, vojvoda of Kitog.
- Petar Moler, vojvoda of Soko.
- Stojan Čupić, vojvoda of Mačva.
- Luka Lazarević, vojvoda of Šabac.
- Petar Džoda, vojvoda (II. class) of Vražogrnac.

1813 elevations

- Milutin Petrović, vojvoda of Krajina.

== Sources ==
- Bodrožić, Đuro (2022). "Vojska i država: počeci moderne srpske vojske". Nacionalni Interes. 44 (2): 29–46. doi:10.22182/ni.4222022.2 (inactive 25 July 2025).
- Đorđević, Tihomir R. (1921). "Кнежине у Србији за време прве владе Кнеза Милоша". Српски књижевни гласник, нова серија. 4: 508–518, 600–611.
- Milićević, Milan Đ. (1888). Поменик знаменитих људи у српског народа новијега доба. Издање Чупићеве задужбине.
- Mišković, Jovan (2021) [1895]. "Српска војска и војевање за време устанка, од 1804–1815 године". Приступне беседе српских академика: 1886-1947. 2. Српска академија наука и уметности: 400–426.
- Nenadović, Konstantin N. (1884). Живот и дела великог Ђорђа Петровића Кара-Ђорђа. Vol. II (1 ed.). Vienna: У Штампарији Јована Н. Вернаја – via Google Books.
