= Serbian Army (revolutionary) =

Military of Revolutionary Serbia (1804–1813)

- Српска војска
- National flag and ensign
- Founded: 1804
- Current form: Serbian Armed Forces
- Disbanded: 1813
- Headquarters: Topola

Leadership
- Supreme Commander: Karađorđe

Personnel
- Active personnel: 37,000 (1810); 41,500 (1813)

Industry
- Foreign suppliers: Russian Empire (from 1807)

Related articles
- History: Serbian Revolution

The Serbian Army was the military force of Revolutionary Serbia, active during the First Serbian Uprising (1804–13) fighting against the Ottoman Empire. Established at first as a peasant army against the oppressive Dahije who had wrested the Pashalik of Belgrade from the Sultan, it became a resistance movement to the Ottomans which managed to create an independent state, restoring Serbian statehood in the Central Balkans after centuries of Ottoman rule. Distinguished community leaders, the Serbian Free Corps veterans and hajduks mustered a militia which transformed into an army with decisive victories and relations with Austria and Russia.

== Background ==
The rebel army had precursors in the Serbian Free Corps employed by the Habsburg Monarchy in the Austro-Turkish War (1788–1791), and the "national militia" employed by Hadji Mustafa Pasha, the Vizier of Belgrade (1793–1801), against the problematic Janissaries and the rebel leader Osman Pazvantoğlu of the Sanjak of Vidin.

The leading janissaries, called the Dahije, wrested the Pashalik of Belgrade from the Sultan, renewed terror and abolished the Serbs' self-governing rights. The economic hardships, evil administration, violence and "Slaughter of the Knezes" led to the uprising against the Dahije in 1804. Fighting legally from the Sultan's perspective at first, as the Dahije were renegades, the turning point came at Ivankovac where the Serbian troops had a major victory against Ottoman troops. Now, the Serbs fought for national liberation and restoration of the Serbian state. There were various plans of restoring a Serbian state in the 18th century, with either Habsburg or Russian support, but these had ultimately failed. The cult of the medieval Serbian state was strong in the Serbian Church and among the farmers and shepherds, who kept the tradition through the monasteries and epic poetry.

While Serbs had revolted earlier, they were decisive under Karađorđe's strong leadership and managed to organize themselves, in their own interest, not relying on external powers.

== Organization ==
=== Command ===
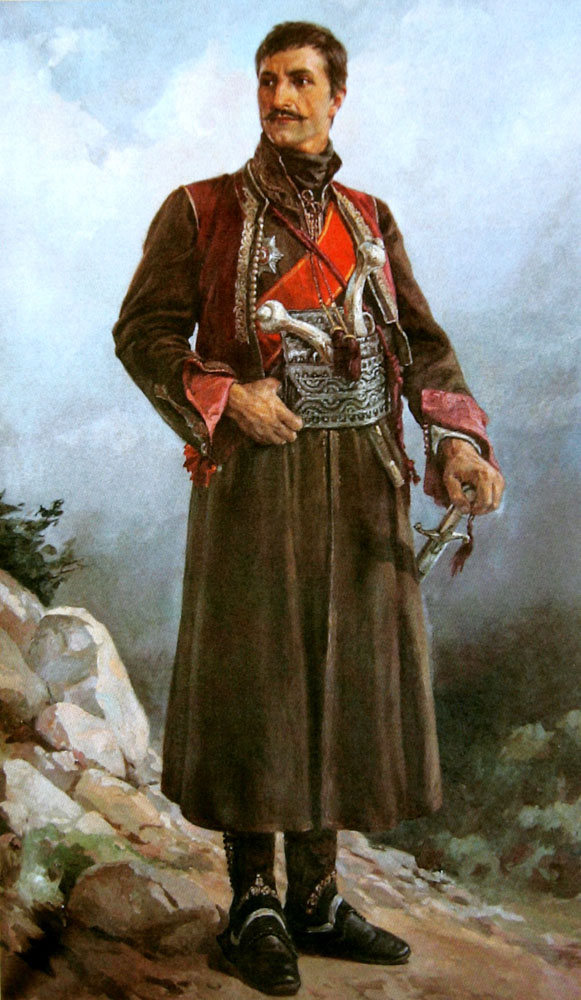
Karađorđe, supreme commander.

The Serbian rebel army was commanded by Karađorđe, the most able of the vojvoda in Šumadija. He was a veteran of the Serbian Free Corps and Mustafa Pasha's militia, and upon his return from Koča's Frontier hajduks from various nahiyah confided in him. Šumadija was a forested region inhabited mostly by refugees and hajduks. Karađorđe was described as physically strong, decisive, violent, heroic and fearsome. He had considerable experience from his Austrian service (being ranked stražmešter or narednik, sergeant) and understood how only a regular trained army could manage against the Ottomans.

In the beginning of the uprising braver locals gathered around their starešina (chief, elder), gradually expanding with rebels joining of good will or through pressure. The first bands gathered around leaders such as Karađorđe, Stanoje Glavaš and Janko Katić in Šumadija, Jakov Nenadović in Kolubara and Milenko Stojković in Pomoravlje. When the uprising expanded the gathering of troops was through the knez, who often also was the starešina, or another notable or merchant, such as Milan Obrenović, Mladen Milovanović, Teodosije Marićević and others. Archpriest Matija Nenadović described the starešina as coming from "the wealthiest of Serbs, who was a knez, merchant, priest, kmet (serf) or otherwise wealthy, having a good patrimony, zadruga, plenty of livestock, mills and other income" and who could gather men and arm them. The first starešine of the not yet organized army were recognized by the commoners in distinguished individuals in their midst, however, as the battles continued and the rebels became better organized, distinction through battle singled out people fit for leadership.

=== Structure and personnel ===
The army was made up of local rebels, commoners belonging to the rayah (Ottoman tax-paying lower class), without wages but had some structure resembling a standing army. In the beginning, the rebel army was a militia with armed civilians, with the troop size depending on liberated territories. In the initial years all abled men were required to join as soldiers. Every soldier took care of his own equipment and weapons, while the government was responsible for food when he was forced to fight on another front far from home. The supply train (Serbian: ratna komora) transferred soldiers to other fronts as the uprising required.

The military organization was territorial, divided into units of desetina ("tenth"), četa ("company") and bataljon ("battalion"), formed according to the local administrative divisions of knežina (villages under the responsibility of a knez) or nahija (a larger group of villages) which gave their names to the individual units. There were three combat arms, the infantry, cavalry and artillery.

Senior ranks were the kaplar ("corporal"), fendrek (from "fähnrich"), kapetan or buljubaša ("captain"), podvojvoda and vojvoda ("warlord"), in the beginning of the First Serbian Uprising (1804–13). The ranks were initially given from within the army until the strengthening of central power when commander-in-chief Karađorđe with or without the Governing Council appointed them. At the end of the uprising, the officer ranks included kapetan, poručnik, potporučnik, praporčik, vahtmajstor (or narednik, from wachtmeister), estandarfirer (or barjaktar, "standard-bearer"), unteroficir (or podnarednik) and barabančik (or dobošar, "drummer").

Ranks
1804–05	vojvoda	bimbaša	buljubaša	harambaša				barjaktar		dobošar
1808	vojvoda	podvojvoda/mali vojvoda	kapetan/buljubaša	urednik/fendrik/barjaktar					kaplar	dobošar
1811	vojvoda (I. class)	vojvoda (II. class)	kapetan	poručnik	potporučnik	praporčik	vahtmajstor/narednik	estandarfirer/barjaktar	unteroficir/podnarednik	barabančik/dobošar

A "regular battalion" (Serbian: batalijon regulaša) was established in 1808 in Belgrade, alongside an artillery battery (Serbian: baterija tobdžija), and the national army adopted some military occupation specialties. The transformation into a regular army was however not initially viewed enthusiastically by those soldiers who wanted to stay close to their home, but Karađorđe managed to silence dissent. The establishment of the regular battalion and artillery battery were the beginning of a modern army, with a contemporary system of military organization and "European-styled" training. The regular battalion was well-equipped under the circumstances, mostly due to Russian support; all members wore Russian uniform and were trained by Russian officers. In 1809 Karađorđe ordered the establishment of a rota or kompanija (company) of 250 younger men from zadruga families in each nahija, commanded by a captain. The regular army was now divided into two formations, infantry and cavalry, while the artillery formed a special corps. There were plans in 1808 to establish an engineering corps. By the summer of 1812 there were six regular battalions numbering 4308 soldiers. Prior to the Ottoman invasion of 1813, the army numbered 12,000 in garrisons of towns and trenches and 41,500 soldiers at home were called upon.

There were also troops known as the momci ("young men") and bećari ("bachelors"), both which had wages and could be seen as part of the standing army, the former being a kind of private army of the voivodes and the latter being mercenaries mostly from outside Ottoman territories, though some local impoverished peasants joined them. The momci had wages but no uniforms nor a fixed active duty. The bećari were mostly infantry, some cavalry, tasked with border security or served as crews in fortified camps and trenches, notably in the garrisons of Belgrade, Deligrad, Šabac and other towns, and they too, served as bodyguards for chiefs. Their monthly wage was 15 groschen and they also had the right to partake in the division of loot.

=== Supplies and volunteers ===
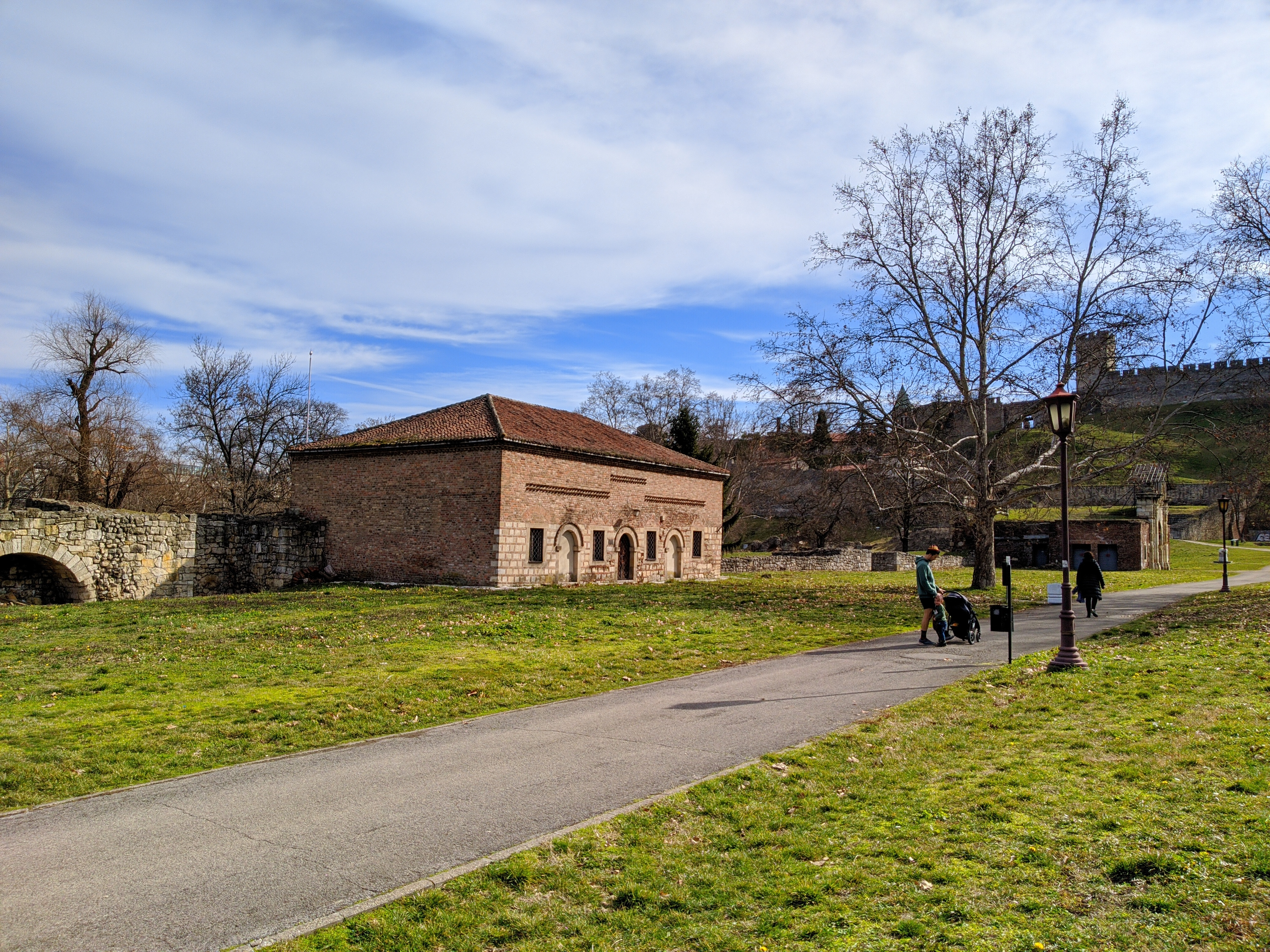
Foundry in Belgrade.

There were volunteers from other regions who joined to fight the Ottomans for patriotic reasons. Army officers from south Hungary and the Military Frontier crossed into Serbia and served as volunteers. Rebel bands from Old Herzegovina and Brda raided across Bosnia and Stari Vlah in 1806, then joined up with the Serbian army in Topola and participated in the successful siege of Belgrade (1806).

During the initial phase, Serb traders from Habsburg Syrmia, Banat and Bačka supplied the rebel army with arms and ammunition, while a significant number of officers and soldiers arrived from the Slavonian Military Frontier. Wallachian lord Constantine Ypsilantis provided arms and supplies and a small unit after initial success in 1804. In 1807, some 800 Bulgarians joined the Serbian troops after Karađorđe had armed 5,000 anti-Ottoman rebels the year before. In 1807, 515 Austrian soldiers deserted to Serbia, of which 188 belonged to regular regiments and were esteemed in their Military Frontier units. Stratimirović informed the Austrian court in 1807 that the rebel army had greatly expanded, also noting that some rebels were focused on looting weapons, military equipment and coins.

=== Training ===
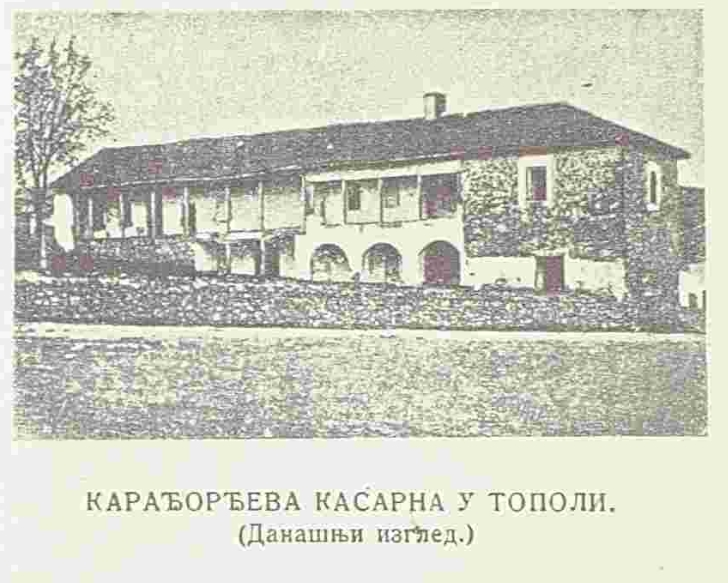
Karađorđe's barracks in Topola.

The first foot drill (egzercir) began in 1804 by the troops besieging Belgrade. The army trained in the nahija and camps, with Karađorđe being known to have personally watched over exercises in Topola, the most important centre for training and military reserve from where units were dispatched. The military training was conducted initially according to Austrian routines as the first instructors (Serbian: egzercir-majstori) either came from the Military Frontier or were local veterans of the Free Corps. In the leadership, Free Corps veterans included Karađorđe, Sima Marković, Miloje Todorović, among others. Austrian influence was evident also in the names of officer ranks. With the Russian-Serbian alliance and arrival of Russian troops in 1807, the training was conducted according to Russian routines. For a period following this, there were two military training divisions in Serbia, one in the east, where the rebels fought alongside the Russians and had many of their officers among their ranks, and one in the west, where there were Austrian instructors and proximity to Austrian borders, however, by the end, the Russian principle prevailed. The first regulations of training were implemented with the establishment of the regular battalion in 1808, while the second regulations came in 1813 and included pictures of uniforms, further regulations were written the same year in the Military Code (Serbian: Военнии устав, Војни устав) by the captain of regular troops Jakov Jakšić according to Russian principle.

=== Law ===
War spoils are important motivation in all wars, and the rebels used the Byzantine principles for the soldier's right to loot (Ekloge ton nomon and Prochiron) and were morally justified in looting "Turk" feudal lords. Most of the loot ended up in the hands of the starešina (chief), often through incorrect division. Due to this, although only formally, point 10 in Karađorđe's Law Code (zakonik) includes fines to the chief if he steals his soldier's rightful loot. There were instances where chiefs freed individuals from conscription in exchange for unpaid work (corvée, known in Serbo-Croatian as kuluk), and this was also regulated with fines and temporary exclusion from the government. Letting soldiers go home in exchange for gifts and bribes were seen as treason.

== Operation ==
=== First Serbian Uprising ===
The first uprising spanned from 1804 to 1813, for 3,520 days. There were 210 larger battles, skirmishes or lesser clashes. The total highest number of Serbian personnel ranges between 49–55,000 according to reliable estimates. The Serbian Army had 38,808 losses, while the Ottoman Army had 101,557 losses. The total number of commanders in the first uprising is undetermined; older historiography numbers 69 (Vuk Karadžić), 89 (Batalaka), 110 (Petar Jokić), 112 (Konstantin Nenadović); newer historiography number 156–175. Army captain Andra J. Milojević estimated in 1904 that 38 commanders (including those ranked vojvoda of both I. and II. classes, kapetan, bimbaša and buljubaša) fell during the uprising, while M. Nedeljković estimated 27 (only vojvoda). Most commanders fled Serbia upon quelling of the uprising, while at most 30 vojvoda remained.

=== Second Serbian Uprising ===
The second uprising was active for less than 100 days. Notably, 7–9 commanders fell.

== Equipment ==
The army was equipped with flintlock pistols (kubura), flintlock muskets, swords (mostly yatagans). The most notable infantry and cavalry wielded Damascus steel sabres (dimiskije).

Flintlock muskets included the krdžalinka (named after the kircali mercenaries), with an Arabian-type gunstock, the tančica ("thin one") which were long and thin, suitable for guerilla warfare, and the šišana which were heavy infantry rifles used in the Ottoman Empire for fortress defense. The ornamented šišane were known as džeferdar.

== Units ==
=== Nahija and knežina units ===
- Belgrade nahija
  - Posavska (Belgrade) knežina, under vojvoda and knez Sima Marković
  - Kolubarska (Belgrade) knežina, under knez Aksentije Miladinović
  - Belgrade city, under vojvoda Đorđe Milovanović (1811–1813), with bećari under vojvoda Miloje Petrović
  - Belgrade garrison, under vojvoda Jovica Milovanović
- Grocka (Gročanska) nahija
  - Grocka (Gročanska) knežina, under voivodes Vasa Čarapić (-1806), Tanasije Čarapić (1806-10), Ilija Čarapić (1810-13)
  - Turija/Kosmaj (Turijska/Kosmajska) knežina, under voivodes Janko Katić (-1806), Marko Katić (1806-10), Stevan Katić (1810-13), Nikola Katić (1813)
- Smederevo nahija, under voivodes Đuša Vulićević (-1805) and Vujica Vulićević (1805-)
  - Jasenička (Smederevo) knežina, under vojvoda Stanoje Glavaš
  - Podunavska knežina, under vojvoda Janko Đurđević
  - Smederevo town, under vojvoda Vule Ilić Kolarac
- Jagodina nahija
  - Levačka knežina, under knez Petar Vukomanović and voivodes Ilija Vukomanović, Stevan Jakovljević and Jovan Jakovljević
  - Belička knežina, under vojvoda Miloje Teodorović
  - Temnićka knežina, under vojvoda Stevan Kara
- Kragujevac nahija, under vojvoda Mladen Milovanović
  - Jasenička (Kragujevac) knežina, under obor-knez Teodosije Maričević (–1805), Matija Jovičić (1805–1813)
  - Gružanska knežina, under vojvoda Jovan Dimitrijević Dobrača
- Rudnik nahija, under vojvoda Milan Obrenović (1810)
  - Crnogorska knežina, under vojvoda Joksim Karamarković
  - Karanovačka knežina and Karanovac town, under Antonije Ristić Pljakić
  - Kačerska (Kačer) knežina, under vojvoda Arsenije Loma (1811-)
  - Moravska (Morava) knežina, under Lazar Mutap
    - Moravska (Morava) momci under vojvoda Jovan Kursula
    - Užice town, under vojvoda Raka Levajac (1810-13)
- Valjevo nahija, under vojvoda Jakov Nenadović (-1806)
  - Tamnavska (Tamnava) knežina, under prota Matija Nenadović (1804-05) and Jevrem Nenadović (1811-)
  - Posavska (Valjevo) knežina, under vojvoda Sima Nenadović
  - Račanska knežina
  - Kolubarska (Kolubara, Valjevo) knežina, under obor-knez Nikola Grbović (-1806), voivodes Stevan Grbović (1806), Milovan Grbović (1806-08), Radovan Grbović (1808-13)
  - Podgorska (Podgor) knežina, under Milić Kedić and Dimitrije M. Kedić
    - Hajduk band of Nedić (1804)
- Šabac nahija
  - Šabac fortification, under voivodes Ostoja Spuž (-1807), Luka Lazarević (1807-13)
  - Pocerska (Cer) knežina, under obor-knez Ilija Marković (-1806), voivodes Miloš Stojićević Pocerac (1806-11), Janko Stojićević Pocerac (1811-13)
  - Mačvanska (Mačva) knežina, under vojvoda Stojan Čupić
- Soko (Sokoska) nahija (including parts of Zvornik nahija of Bosnia), under Petar Nikolajević Moler (1806-12) and Cincar Marko (1812-13)
  - Soko (Sokoska) knežina, under voivodes Blagoje Marinković, Blagoje Petrović, Milutin Vasić
  - Jadar (Jadranska) knežina, under voivodes Anta Bogićević (1806-13), Bogosav Bogićević (1813)
- Užice nahija, under vojvoda Melentije Stevanović
  - Rača (Račanska) knežina, under vojvoda Kara-Marko Vasić (1810–1813), Blagoje (1813)
  - Užice town, under vojvoda Aleksa Popović
  - Zlatibor, under vojvoda Mihailo Radović
  - Rujno (Rujanska) knežina, under vojvoda Miloš Obrenović
  - Starovlaška (Stari Vlah, Užice) knežina, under vojvoda Petronije Šišo
  - Požeška (Požega) knežina
- Čačak nahija
  - Dragačevska (Dragačevo) knežina, under Milutin Ilić
  - Studenička (Studenica) knežina, under priest and vojvoda Filip Petrović
  - Starovlaška (Stari Vlah, Čačak) knežina, under knez and vojvoda Maksim Rašković
  - Novo-pazarska knežina, under vojvoda Hadži-Prodan Gligorijević
  - Trnavska knežina
- Kruševac nahija
  - Kruševac knežina and town, under vojvoda Čolak Anta Simeonović
  - Kruševac-župa, under vojvoda Petar Đukić
  - Jošanjička knežina, under vojvoda Dimitrije Kujundžija
  - Kurilovačka knežina, under vojvoda Kosta-beg Kujundžija
- Aleksinac nahija
  - Ražanjska knežina, under voivodes Đorđe Kragić (-1809), Petar Kragić (1809-13)
  - Leskovac (frontier), under vojvoda Ilija Petrović Strelja
  - Prokuplje (frontier), under vojvoda Rista
- Gurgusovac (now Knjaževac) nahija, under voivodes Miloje Teodorović, Paulj Matejić (1812-13)
- Crnorečka (Crna Reka) nahija, under vojvoda Milisav Đorđević (1807–
  - Zaječar, under vojvoda Milisav Đorđević (1811–13)
  - Vražogrnac, under vojvoda Petar Džoda (1811–13)
  - Banjska (Banja, Sokobanja) knežina, under vojvoda Hajduk Veljko (1807)
- Krajinska (Timočka Krajina) nahija, under vojvoda Hajduk Veljko (1811–13), Milutin Petrović (1813)
- Kladovo nahija, under vojvoda Živko Konstantinović
- Porečka nahija, under voivodes Jovan Stefanović and Hadži Nikola Mihailović
- Požarevac nahija, under voivodes Milenko Stojković (-1811), Cincar Janko (1811-)
  - Mlavska (Mlava) knežina, under voivodes Petar Teodorović Dobrnjac and Paulj Matejić
  - Požarevac knežina, under voivodes Ivo Momirović (-1811), Cincar Janko (1811-)
  - Ramska knežina, under voivodes Živko Šljivić (1811-), Janko Šljivić (-1813)
  - Homoljska (Homolje) knežina, under vojvoda Ilija Stošić (1811-)
- Ćuprijska (Ćuprija) nahija
  - Resava knežina, under voivodes Stevan Sinđelić (–1809), Milosav Zdravković (1809–), Milovan Sinđelić
- Paraćin nahija, under vojvoda Ilija Barjaktarović (1805–09)

=== Special units ===
- Regular battalion, established in 1808, trained by Russian officers.
- Artillery battery, established in 1808.
  - Artillery under topčibaša Tomo Milinović
- Momci (bodyguards)
  - Karađorđe's momci, 40 men and four buljubaša, under vojvoda Petar Jokić.
- Bećari (border security, fort and trench crews)
  - Belgrade city bećari under vojvoda Miloje Petrović
- Belgrade Police, under Ilija Novokršteni (–1809)

=== Volunteer units ===
- Goli Sinovi četa, 50–200 men under Zeka Buljubaša.
- Several četa from Old Herzegovina and Brda, raided Bosnia and Stari Vlah, besieged Belgrade (1806).
  - Drobnjak četa, 33 men from Drobnjaci.

== Gallery ==
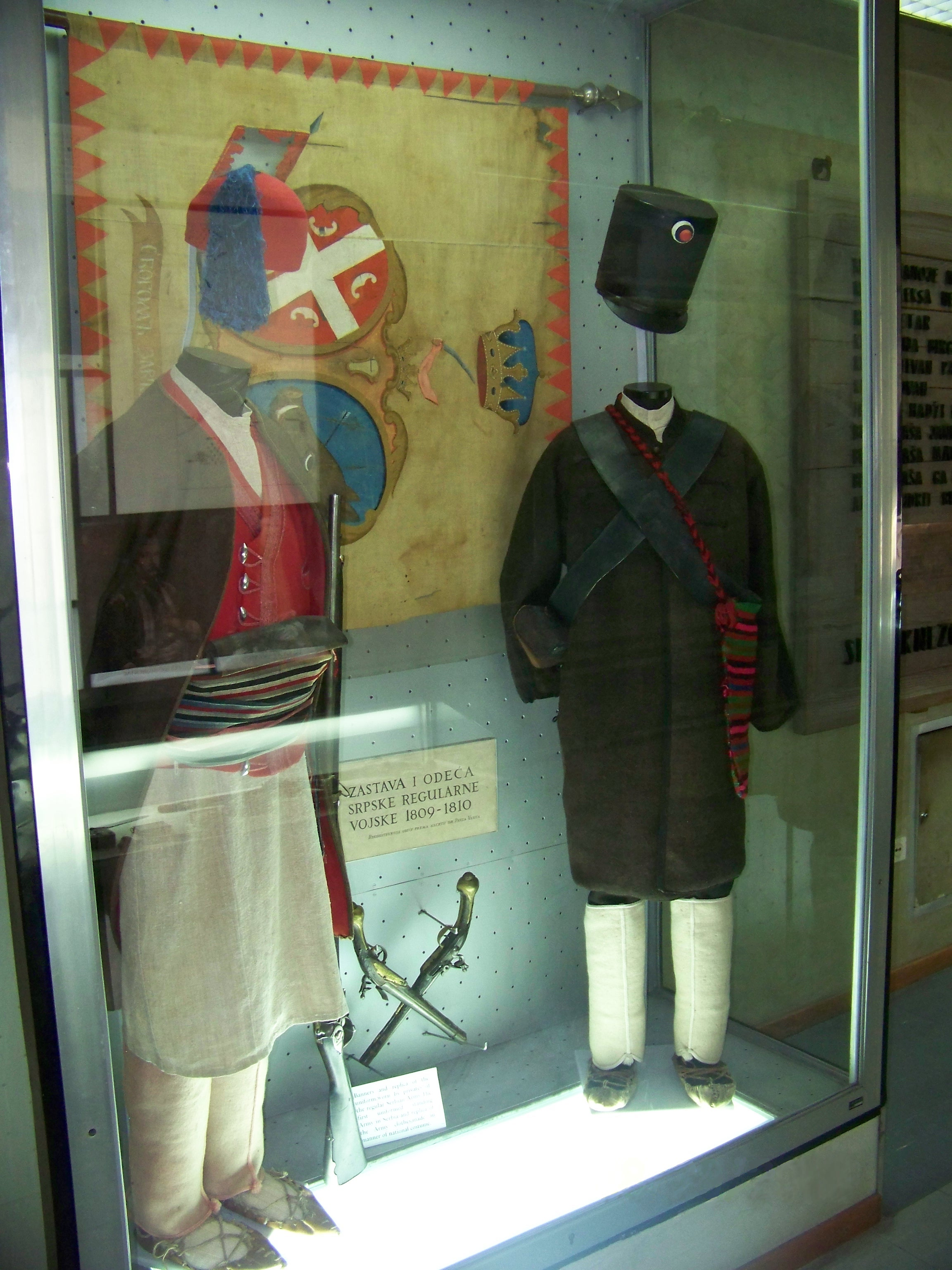
War flag and uniforms of the regular army in 1809–10.

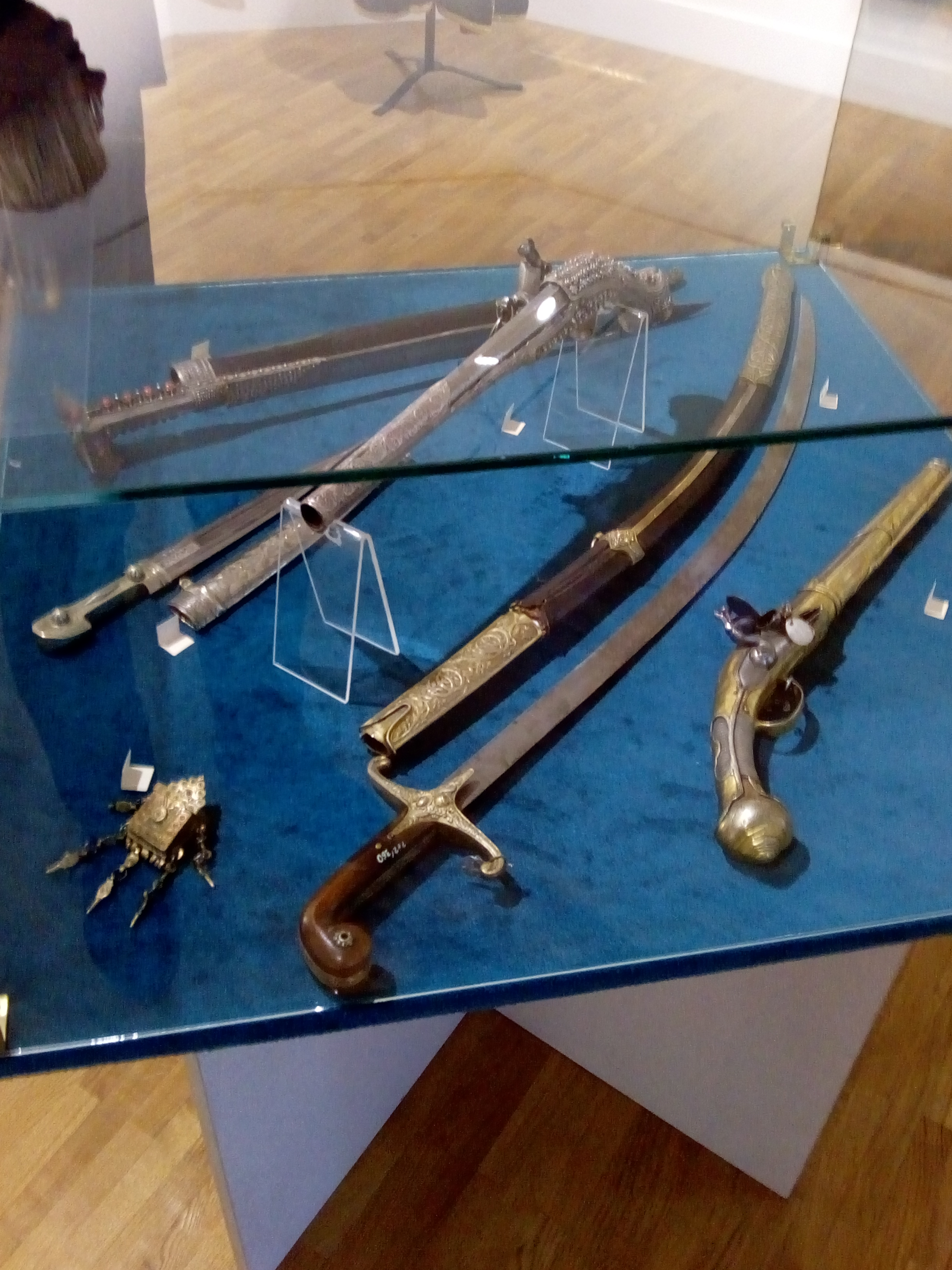
Weapons used in the First Serbian Uprising.

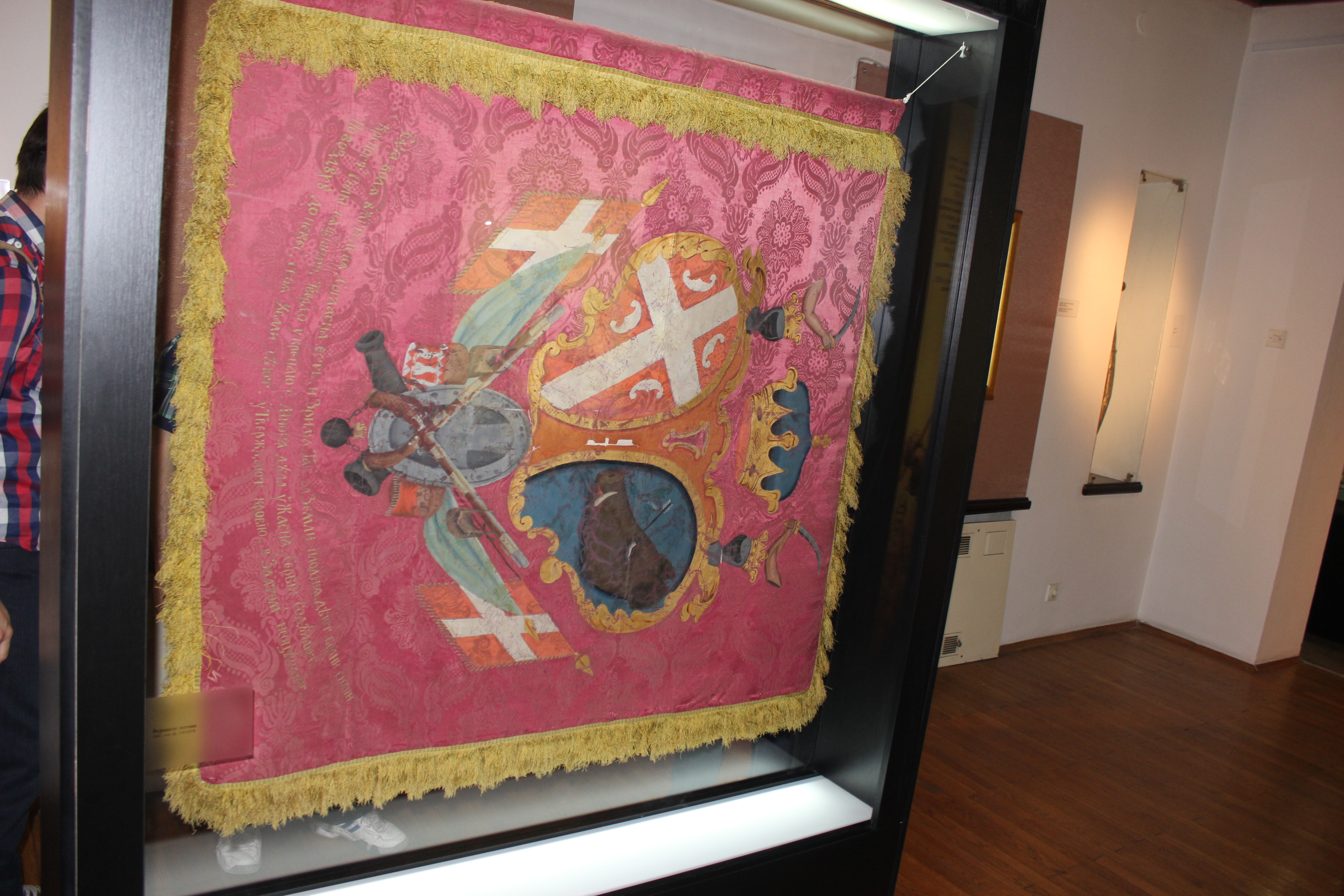
War flag of Karađorđe

== See also ==
- List of Serbian Revolutionaries
- Timeline of the Serbian Revolution

== Annotations ==
1. It is variously known in Serbian as the "Serbian army" (Serbian: Српска војска), "Karađorđe's army" (Карађођева војска), the "national army" (народна војска) or "rebel army" (устаничка војска). The word ustanak is the equivalent of German: aufstand and Russian: восстание, meaning "rebellion, uprising".
2. Karađorđe signed himself as "Serbian commander", "Commander of Serbs" (French: Commandant des Serbes), "Commander of Serbia" (French: Commandant Serbie), "supreme commander/leader in Serbia (vrhovni vožd, French: commandant suprême, German: oberster Anführer), etc.

== Sources ==
- Bataković, Dušan T. (2006). "A Balkan-Style French Revolution? The 1804 Serbian Uprising in European Perspective". Balcanica (XXXVI). Belgrade: Балканолошки институт: 113–128. doi:10.2298/BALC0536113B.
- Bodrožić, Đuro (2022). "Vojska i država: počeci moderne srpske vojske". Nacionalni Interes. 44 (2): 29–46. doi:10.22182/ni.4222022.2 (inactive 23 July 2025).
- Bodrožić, Đuro (2019). "Nacionalna država u Prvom srpskom ustanku". Politička revija. 62 (4): 87–107.
- Deretić, Nataša (2014). "Pojavni oblici korupcije u ustaničkoj Srbiji (1804-1815)". Zbornik radova Pravnog fakulteta. 48 (2). Novi Sad: 307–323.
- Gavrilović, Andra (1904). Црте из историје ослобођења Србије. Belgrade: Нздање дворске књпжаре Мпте Стајпћа у Београду. (Public Domain)
- Leković, Žarko (2016). "Crna Gora, Brda i Stara Hercegovina u Srpskoj Revoluciji (1804-1833)". In Rudić, Srđan; Pavlović, Lela (ed.). Srpska revolucija i obnova državnosti Srbije: Dvesta godina od Drugog srpskog ustanka [Serbian Revolution and Renewal of Serbian Statehood: Two Hundred Years since the Second Serbian Uprising]. Istorijski institut, Beograd; Međuopštinski istorijski arhiv, Čačak. pp. 53–72. ISBN 978-86-7743-116-7.
- Mišković, Jovan (2021) [1895]. "Српска војска и војевање за време устанка, од 1804–1815 године". Приступне беседе српских академика: 1886-1947. 2. Српска академија наука и уметности: 400–426.
- Nedeljković, Slaviša D.; Đorđević, Miloš Z. (2015). "Политичке прилике у београдском пашалуку у предвечерје српске револуције (1787-1804)". Teme. XXXIX (3). Niš: 965–969.
