= Ločevci =

- Village
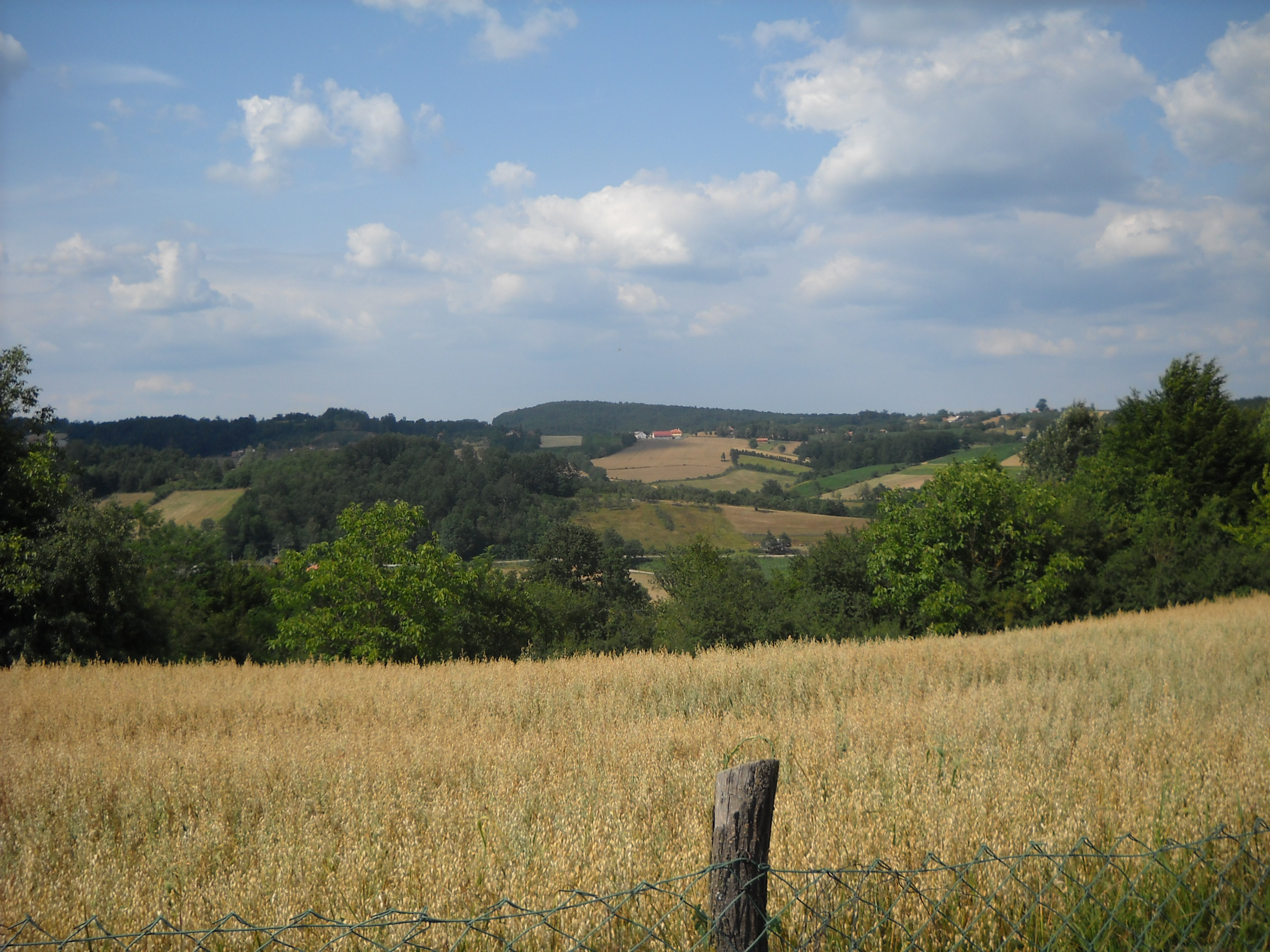

- Location within Serbia
- Coordinates: 44°03′N 20°22′E
- Country: Serbia
- District: Moravica District
- Municipality: Gornji Milanovac

Population (2002)
  - Total: 90
- Time zone: UTC+1 (CET)
  - Summer (DST): UTC+2 (CEST)

Ločevci is a village in the municipality of Gornji Milanovac, Serbia. According to the 2022 census, the village has a population of 52 people.

The village was active in the Serbian Revolution, being organized into the knežina (administrative unit) of Brusnica (Takovo) during the First Serbian Uprising (1804–13). Among notable local revolutionaries were Petar Tomašević and Damnjan Matović-Krdža.
