= Velereč =

- Village
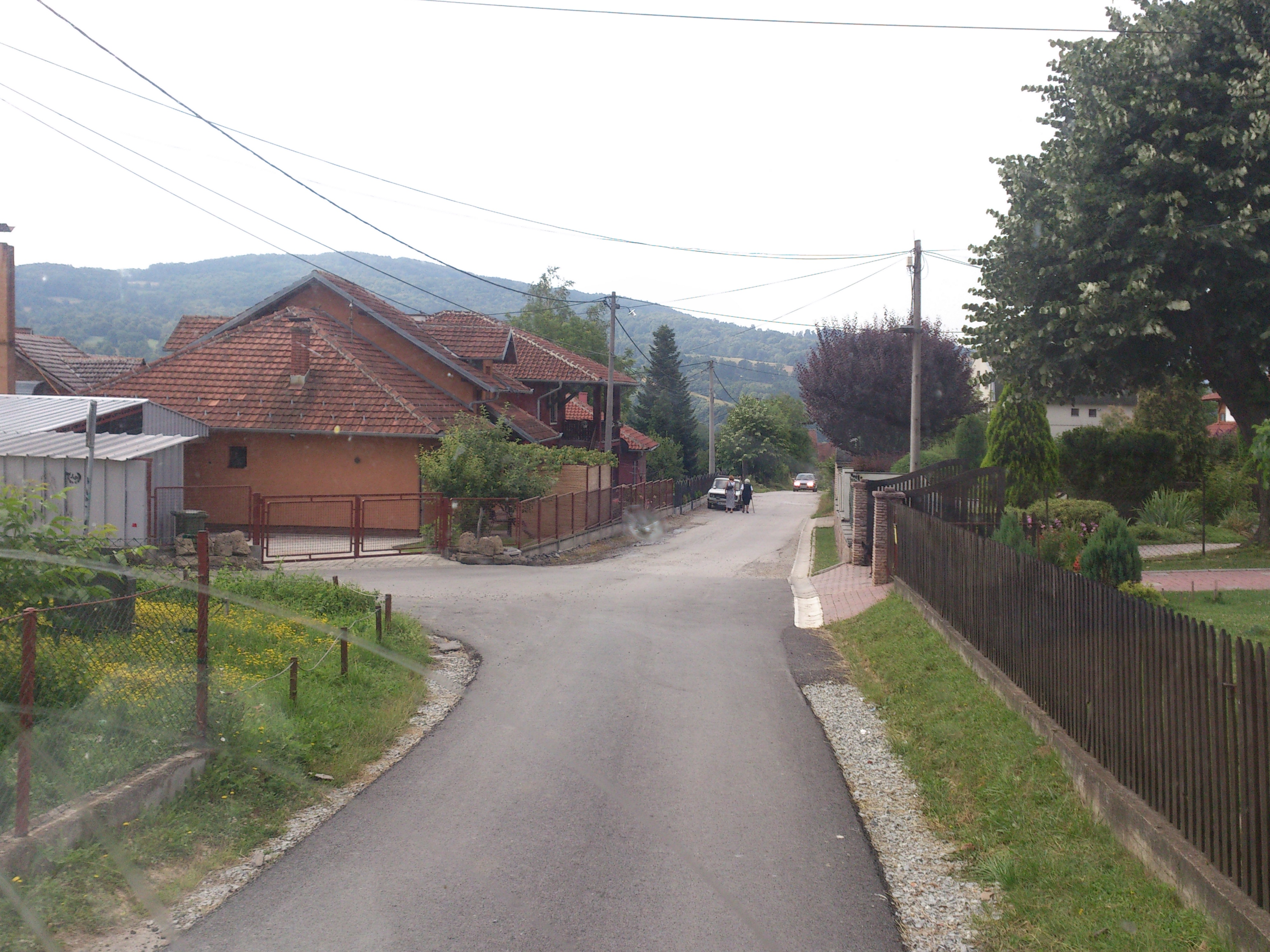
- Recorded while passing through the village.
- Interactive map of Velereč
- Country: Serbia
- Time zone: UTC+1 (CET)
  - Summer (DST): UTC+2 (CEST)

Velereč (Serbian: Велереч) is a village in Gornji Milanovac municipality of Serbia, located at 44°02′55″N 20°28′39″E. In the 2002 census, it had 565 residents.

The village was active in the Serbian Revolution, being organized into the knežina (administrative unit) of Brusnica (Takovo) during the First Serbian Uprising (1804–13). Among notable local revolutionaries were Vuleta Srećković and Antonije Srećković.
