= Klatičevo =

Coordinates: 44.0667°N 20.4167°E

- Village
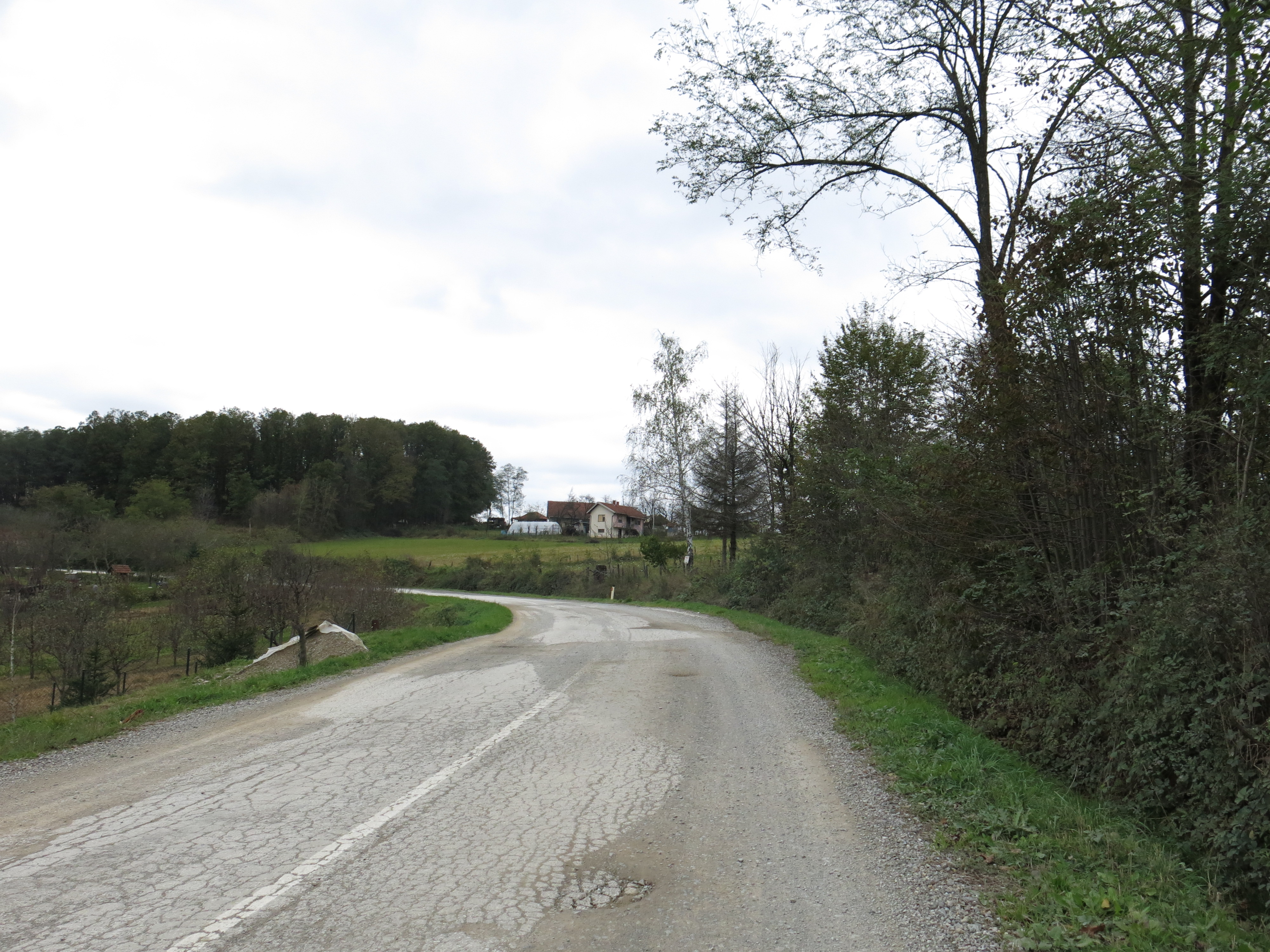
- Klatičevo, Street
- Interactive map of Klatičevo
- Country: Serbia
- District: Moravica District
- Municipality: Gornji Milanovac

Population (2002)
  - Total: 281
- Time zone: UTC+1 (CET)
  - Summer (DST): UTC+2 (CEST)

Klatičevo is a village in the municipality of Gornji Milanovac, Serbia. According to the 2002 census, the village has a population of 281 people.

The village was active in the Serbian Revolution, being organized into the knežina (administrative unit) of Brusnica (Takovo) during the First Serbian Uprising (1804–13). The revolutionary Milovan Topalović came from the village.
