= Siege of Smederevo (1804) =

Battle part of the first Serbian uprising

- Part of the First Serbian Uprising
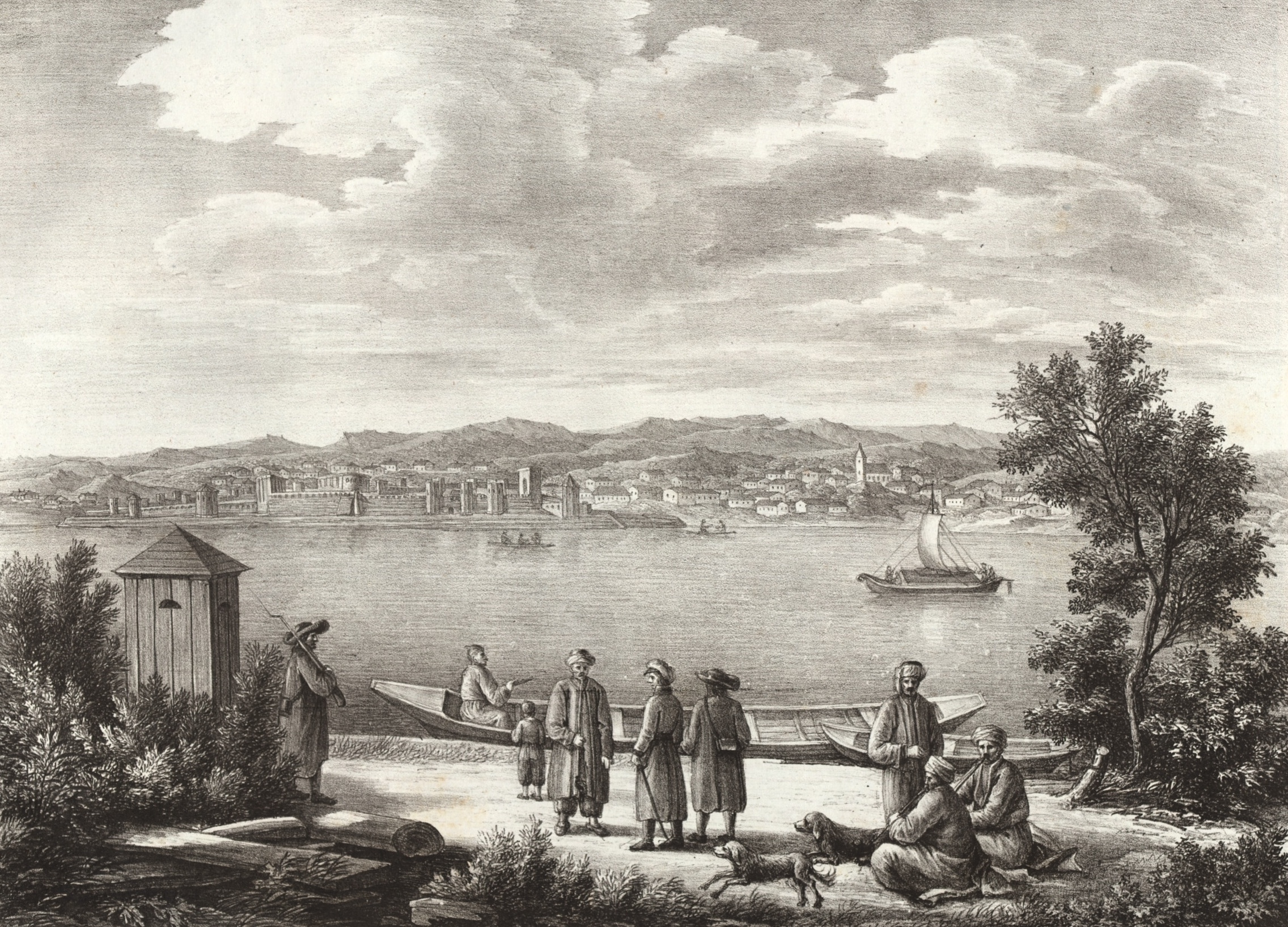
- View of Smederevo
Date	4 June 1804
Location	Smederevo, Sanjak of Smederevo, Ottoman Empire (today Serbia)
Result	Serbian victory
Territorial changes	Smederevo in rebel hands

Belligerents
Serbian rebels	Dahije (Ottoman Empire) Ottoman city garrison

Commanders and leaders
Karađorđe; Jakov Nenadović	

Units involved
Šumadija and Podrinje troops	Smederevo deli and local soldiers Janissaries and kırcalı

Casualties and losses
Small	Many

The Siege of Smederevo was undertaken by the Serbian rebel army led by Karađorđe and Jakov Nenadović against the town of Smederevo, in the hands of the Dahije (renegade Janissaries) supported by the Sanjak of Vidin. Smederevo was an important city in the province, laying in just east of Belgrade. Left without support, the town surrendered after some days and was handed over to the Serbs with the agreed emigration of the Muslim population to Adakale or Vidin.

== Background ==
During the Slaughter of the Knezes, the Smederevo Turks under dizdar Gušo murdered militia buljubaša Teofan from Saone. During the meeting at Drlupa, the Smederevo nahiya Serbs gathered at Selevac and elected merchant Đuša Vulićević their leader. After rebel leader Karađorđe met with Belgrade nahiya leaders in late February and organized the blockade of Belgrade, he went to the Smederevo nahiya and met with Đuša Vulićević and hajduk harambaša Obrad from Krsna, and organized the blockade of Smederevo. When Karađorđe met with Đuša, the Smederevo Turks moved their families from the Smederevo town for safety in the Smederevo Fortress, while the Serbs sent their families into the hills. Skirmishes followed, in and outside Smederevo, between bećari ("bachelors", youngsters) and the Smederevo Turks.

Karađorđe and Jakov Nenadović combined their armies, accompanied by some lesser commanders, and aided Milenko Stojković's siege of Požarevac, arriving in late May with a cannon that they had used in the siege of Šabac, and the city surrendered after some days. Karađorđe stayed and organized the Požarevac nahija for a couple of days, and recognized Milenko, Dobrnjac and Momir as knezes in the nahija. The Požarevac nahija army was ordered to support the siege of Belgrade, while Karađorđe took the Šumadija and Podrinje troops towards Smederevo.

== History ==
Karađorđe arrived at the height above Smederevo from the Požarevac road and shot some cannonballs at the fortress, upon which the Turks immediately signaled for surrender, on the condition that they receive the same status as Šabac, as an Imperial city. According to another version, as told by Gavrilo Kovačević, the rebels took the city through an assault on 25 June [O.S. 13 June] 1804. The dating of the takeover by Kovačević was held as possible per S. Novaković's study (1904) of the traditional sources, however, V. Stojančević (1957) dated it to 4 June. Similarly to Požarevac, the Turks were frightened by the use of cannons. They promised to follow whatever would happen to Belgrade in the future (it was encircled and blocked). Karađorđe approved the Imperial status of the fortress and decided that the Turks live only in the fortress, and be left alone, but were forbidden to go among the Serbs in the villages or the Smederevo town (outside the fortress), which they promised. The Muslim judicial court only deals with the Smederevo Turks while the Serbian court deals with the Serbs. All of this was in line with the rebels' claim to not go against the Sultan's people. The rebels received some payment and gifts, as war payment. The known evildoers in Smederevo were given up to the rebels and executed, while other yabancı (foreigners) were dispersed. Upon this, Đuša Vulićević became the starešina (leader) of all of the rebel Smederevo nahija.

== Aftermath and legacy ==
After Požarevac and Smederevo, only Belgrade remained in the north of the Belgrade Pashalik. Karađorđe, Jakov and Milenko went to Vračar.

== See also ==
- Timeline of the Serbian Revolution
- Serbian Army (revolutionary)
- List of Serbian Revolutionaries

== Annotations ==
1. It is known in historiography as the "submission of Smederevo" (Serbian: pokorenje Smedereva), "liberation of Smederevo" (oslobođenje Smedereva), etc.

== Sources ==
- Batalaka, Lazar Arsenijević (1898). Историја српског устанка: део први [History of the Serbian Uprising: Part One]. Vol. I. Izd. Batalakinoga fonda – via Google Books.
- Milićević, Milan Đ. (1888). Поменик знаменитих људи у српског народа новијега доба. Издање Чупићеве задужбине – via Archive.org.
- Nenadović, Konstantin N. (1884). Живот и дела великог Ђорђа Петровића Кара-Ђорђа [Life and Deeds of Great Đorđe Petrović Kara-Đorđe]. Vol. II (1 ed.). Vienna: У Штампарији Јована Н. Вернаја – via Google Books.
- Nenadović, Konstantin N. (1903) [1883]. Живот и дела великог Ђорђа Петровића Кара-Ђорђа [Life and Deeds of Great Đorđe Petrović Kara-Đorđe]. Vol. I (2 ed.). Belgrade: Штампа Савића и Комп. – via Archive.org.
- Novaković, Stojan (1904). Устанак на дахије 1804 [Uprising against the Dahije]. Штампано у Државној штампарији. pp. 170- – via Archive.org.
- Pavlović, Leontije (2004). "Смедерево у време Првог српског устанка". Mons Aureus. 2 (1): 45–76. ISSN 1451-3846.
- Protić, Kosta (1893). "Ратни догађаји из првога српског устанка под Карађорђем Петровићем 1804—1813". Годишњица Николе Чупића. XIII. Državna štamparija.
- Stojančević, Vladimir (1957). "Борбе за ослобођење Београда 1804–1806 године" (PDF). ГОДИШЊАК. IV. Музеј града Београда: 111–142.
