= Glibovac =

Glibovac Глибовац
- Village (Selo)
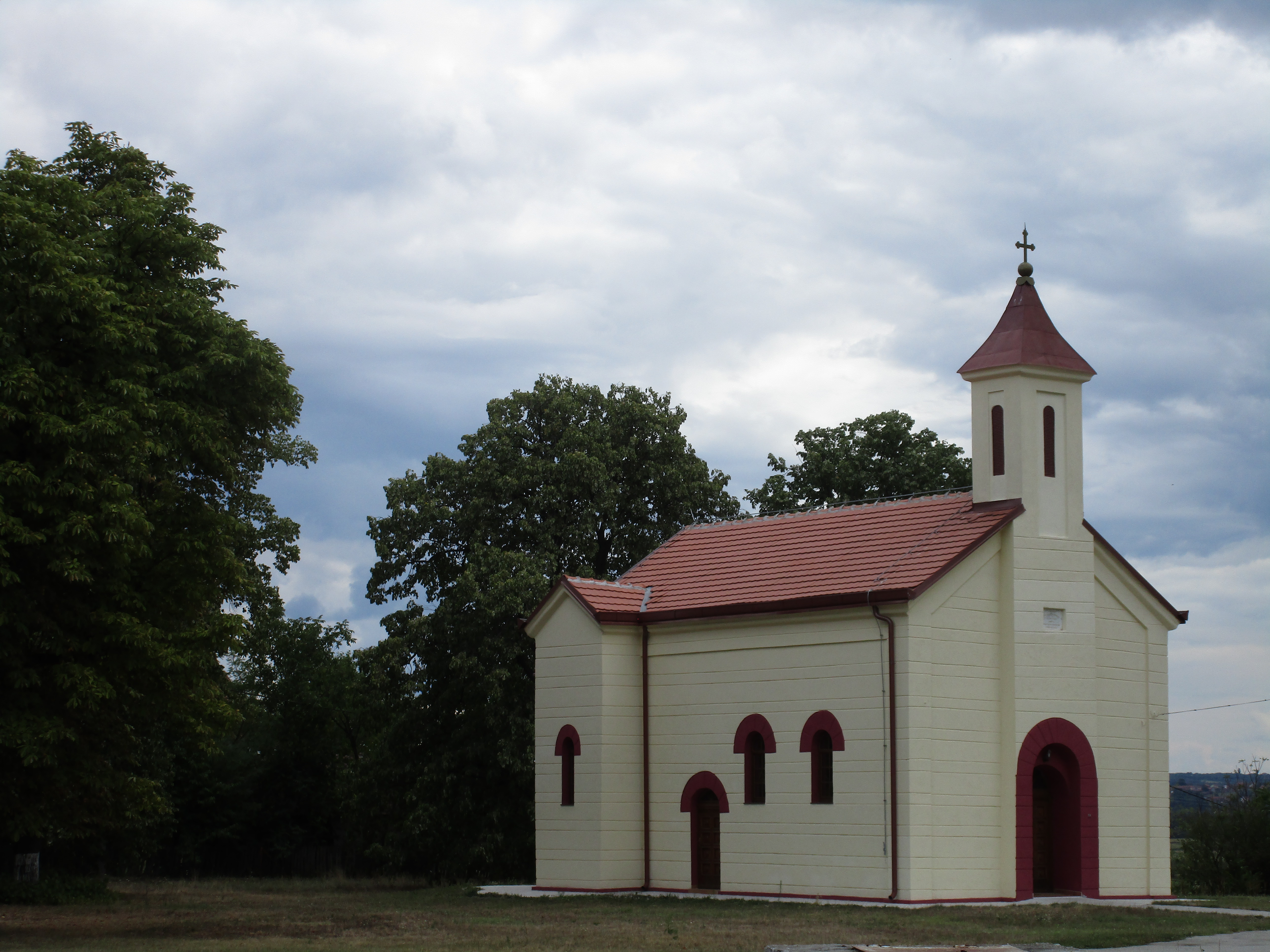
- Church of the Nativity of the Most Holy Mother of God in Glibovac

- Location within Serbia
- Coordinates: 44°22′N 20°54′E
- Country: Serbia
- Regions: Southern and Eastern Serbia
- County: Podunavlje District
- Municipality: Smederevska Palanka

Government
  - Mayor: Predrag Đurđević
- Elevation: 110 m (360 ft)
- Population: 2,269
- Area code: 026
- Vehicle registration: SD

Glibovac (Serbian Cyrillic: Глибовац) is a village located in the municipality of Smederevska Palanka in the Podunavlje district of Serbia. Glibovac is situated about 4 km from the centre of Smederevska Palanka along the railway going north towards Smederevo and Belgrade. The village is divided into two parts, Gornji Glibovac (upper) and Donji Glibovac (lower). It is also sometimes called Salevac, the name of the small area between in the rivers that form the Mali Lug and Kubršnica. According to the 2002 census, Glibovac had 2,269 inhabitants, with an average age of 40,7, and 639 households, the majority ethnic Serb (98,72).

== History ==
The original name of the village was Salevac. The village was, as several neighbouring ones, likely established prior to Austrian occupation of Serbia (1718–1739).

The name of Glibovac originates from a Serbian word for mud. The oldest mention of Glibovac dates to 1784 by an Austrian spy crossing the area. In 1919, archaeologists from the Art History Archive in Belgrade discovered remains of a Roman town on the site of the village. In a field near the hamlet of Bubanj, 375 coins were found dating from the reigns of Septimius Severus (193–211 AD) and Volusianus (251–253 AD).

The village was part of the Smederevo nahiya of the Sanjak of Smederevo ("Belgrade Pashalik") in the late Ottoman period. The village was active in the armed phase of the Serbian Revolution, with famed hajduk Stanoje Glavaš hailing from the village. A primary school was first opened in 1891, and it is today named after Stanoje Glavaš.

From 1888 to 1902, Glibovac was an opština (municipality) with Pridvorica, Vodice and Mala Plana, and afterwards became a municipality of its own. According to the 1921 census, there were 293 households with 1,842 inhabitants.

During World War II, the village was included in Yugoslav Partisan operations.

== Culture ==
Every early August since 2005, Glibovac has organized a cultural and sporting event known as Dani Stanoja Glavaša ("Days of Stanoje Glavaš"). There is a competition and the winner is crowned harambaša (hajduk leader).

== Notable people ==
- Stanoje Glavaš (1763–1815), Serbian hajduk and revolutionary.
- Mile Nikolić–Hajduk-Mileta, hajduk under Glavaš.
- Slobodan Ignjatović, former Minister of Information in FR Yugoslavia, father of singer Konstrakta.

== See also ==
- List of places in Serbia

== Sources ==
- Drobnjaković, Borivoje M. (1925). Смедеревско Подунавље и Јасеница: антропогеографска испитивања. Српска краљевска академија. pp. 297–300.
- Drobnjaković, Borivoje M.; Mileker, Feliks (1929). Letopisi opština Podunavske Oblasti. Napredak.
- Peruničić, Branko (1980). "Глибовац". Smederevska Palanka i okolina. Skupština opštine Smederevska Palanka.
