= Palež =

Palež may refer to several places:

== Bosnia and Herzegovina ==
- Palež (Višegrad), village
- Palež (Srebrenica), village
- Gornji Palež, village in the municipality of Kiseljak
- Donji Palež, village in the municipality of Kiseljak

== Montenegro ==
- Palež, Žabljak, village

== Serbia ==
- Palež, former name of the town of Obrenovac
