= Mihailo Radović =

Serbian revolutionary

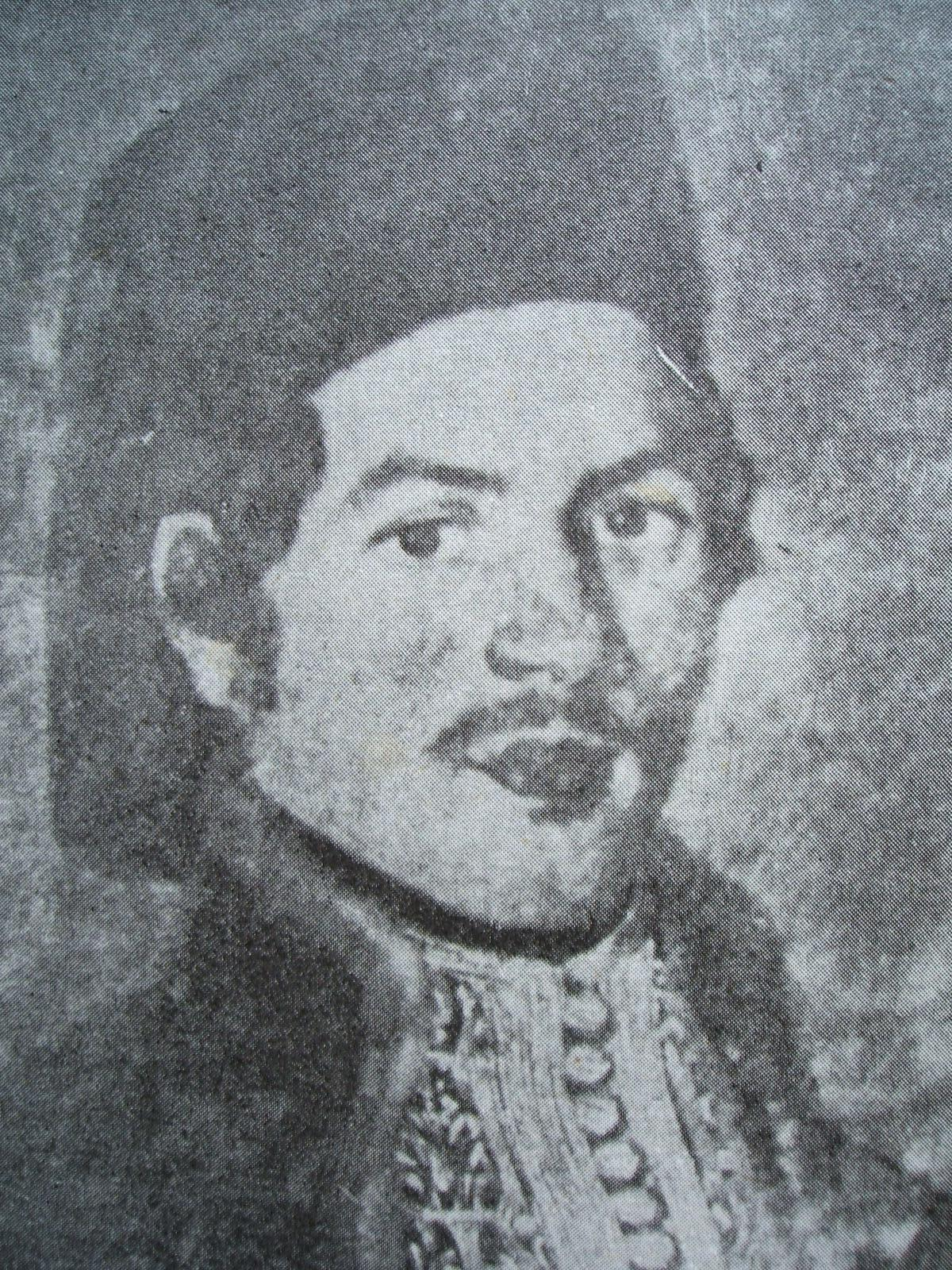
Mihailo Radović

Mihailo Radović (1759–1822) was one of the organizers of the uprising in the Užice region, in 1804 and a participant in the First and Second Serbian Uprising.

Mihailo Radović's ancestors are from Montenegro and during the migration, they first stayed near Priboj and from there they settled, at the end of the 17th or the beginning of the 18th century, in the village of Ravni in the Užice region. Mihailo was born in 1759 and very early, as a child aged 4 or 6, he lost his parents who died of the plague of 1763-1765.

Until the First Serbian Uprising, he also lived in the village, engaged in agriculture and cattle breeding. As a diligent, enterprising and prudent man, he acquired considerable wealth and was respected in his village and the entire region.

When the uprising broke out in 1804, Mihailo was a mature man of 45 at the time. He was, undoubtedly, one of the organizers of the uprising in the Rujno Principality. He took part, with his fighters, in all the battles during the uprising in the Užice region. He participated with his men in the capture of Uzice in 1805. Even then, he stood out as a good hero " distinguished by his courage and memory", as a historian Milan Milićević puts it. Then he became an elder - a knez of Zlatibor. He also distinguished himself in the battles of 1807 during the conquest of the Užice fortress. In the following years, Radović was a zealous border guard in the southwestern part of insurgent Serbia. He stood guard on the southern slopes of Zlatibor, defending this area from sudden Turkish attacks. He stood out especially in January 1808, when the Turks tried to surprise the insurgents on Christmas Eve in Talambas. In the deep snow, Radović's brave warriors beat the Turkish attackers. At the suggestion of Miloš Obrenović, who was the commander of the Užice Nahija, for this feat, Radović was appointed by the Karađorđe and the Governing Council as the Duke of Zlatibor, issuing him a diploma on that occasion. He also stood out in the battles against Suleiman Pasha of Skopje when in 1809 he struck Talambas with 3,000 men, where a fortified trench was located.

The Užice region in 1813 was not exposed to more serious attacks by the Turks. At the invitation of Karađorđe, Radović and his fighters rushed to the aid of the brave defenders of Ravni and Zasavica. However, they did not get there because they found out about the Serbian defeat in the Valjevo area.

Radović also distinguished himself in catching hajduks who were in our area at that time. According to Karađorđe's requests, he also took care of security, food, heating, hay for the needs of the city of Užice.

After the uprising broke out, Radović did not escape across the border. He stayed in his area with his warriors hiding in the forests of Zlatibor.

When, after Hadži Prodan's revolt in 1814, the riots in Serbia and preparations for action began, the Turks suddenly summoned and arrested prominent people in the spring of 1815 for safety, holding them hostage so that there would be no riots in their region. Mihailo Radović was among those arrested. As Jovan Mićić approached Užice with the insurgents, the Turks decided to kill the arrested. Upon learning of the Turkish intention, the prisoners decided to escape, descending through the walls of the city of Užice. Of those four, only Radović and Maslać survived. Radović immediately joined the insurgents.

From 1815 to 1819, Radović stood out as an elder in the Užice region. In some documents, he is mentioned as the ober-knez of the Užice nahiye.

Due to kidney disease in 1819, he retired from the state, public and military affairs and lived in his village. He died in 1822 in Ravni, where he was buried.

Mihailo Radović was a typical MP in the turbulent times of the Serbian uprisings, always accepting responsible administrative positions such as secretary in important sessions. Unlike some other leaders who were hajduks, or leaders of hajduks, merchants or priests, Radović was a man of the people, an educated peasant who gained a great reputation and deserved respect only through honest hard work and sacrifice. He was characterized by courage and intelligence and honesty (he, unlike some other leaders of the uprising, did not receive any monetary compensation from the state treasury, except the one for covering the necessary expenses). Historian Milan Milićević says of him that he "zealously helped the progress of the people as long as he was alive." In addition to all this, he stood out with great physical strength.
