= Palež, Žabljak =

Palež Палеж
- Village
- Location within Montenegro
- Coordinates: 43.182067°N 19.140944°E
- Country: Montenegro
- Region: Northern
- Municipality: Žabljak

Population (2011)
  - Total: 404
- Time zone: UTC+1 (CET)
  - Summer (DST): UTC+2 (CEST)

Palež (Montenegrin Cyrillic: Палеж) is a village in the municipality of Žabljak, Montenegro.

== Demographics ==
According to the 2011 census, its population was 404.

Ethnicity in 2011
Ethnicity	Number	Percentage
Serbs	189	46.8%
Montenegrins	182	45.0%
other/undeclared	33	8.2%
Total	404	100%
