= Rogača (Sopot) =

Rogača Рогача
- Village
- Location within Serbia
- Coordinates: 44°27′N 20°31′E
- Country: Serbia
- District: Belgrade District
- Municipality: Sopot

Population (2022)
  - Total: ▼837
- Time zone: UTC+1 (CET)
  - Summer (DST): UTC+2 (CEST)

Rogača (Serbian Cyrillic: Рогача) is a village in the municipality of Sopot, Serbia. According to the 2022 census, the village has a population of 837 people. It is the birthplace of one of the leaders of the First Serbian Uprising, Janko Katić.

== History ==
Though the village is older, the first recorded mention is from the early 18th century. On one map from the period of 1718-1739 Austrian occupation of northern Serbia, the village is recorded as Rogomiz. In the first decades of the 19th century, Rogača was part of Katić knežina (administrative unit in Revolutionary Serbia). In 1846 it became administrative seat of the newly formed Turija srez.

The first court in the Belgrade nahiyah was established in Rogača.

== Features ==
There is a Serbian Orthodox church of the Holly Trinity in the village, on the hillock above. It is a resting place for 600 killed third-reserve soldiers during the 1914 Battle of Kosmaj. In the center of the village there is a memorial for the killed in World War II. In 2004, a monument to Janko Katić was erected next to the World War II memorial. The monument is a work of Milanko Mandić and is surrounded by the pine trees. Katić was killed fighting the Ottomans in western Serbia and was buried in the neighboring village of Sibnica. In 1934 his remains were reinterred in the memorial ossuary in the Rogača's church.

The grave of another rebel, Pavle Cukić, is also located in Rogača. He was killed, on the orders of ruling prince Miloš Obrenović in the spring of 1817 in Rogača. His head was cut off and sent to Belgrade. Cukić's grave was discovered in c.2010, when a local farmer discovered a tombstone while he was clearing a meadow. Next to Cukić's tomb there is another memorial with carved bradva, an adze.
