= Progorelica =

Coordinates: 43°40′26″N 20°33′55″E

Progorelica Прогорелица (Serbian)
- Village (Selo)
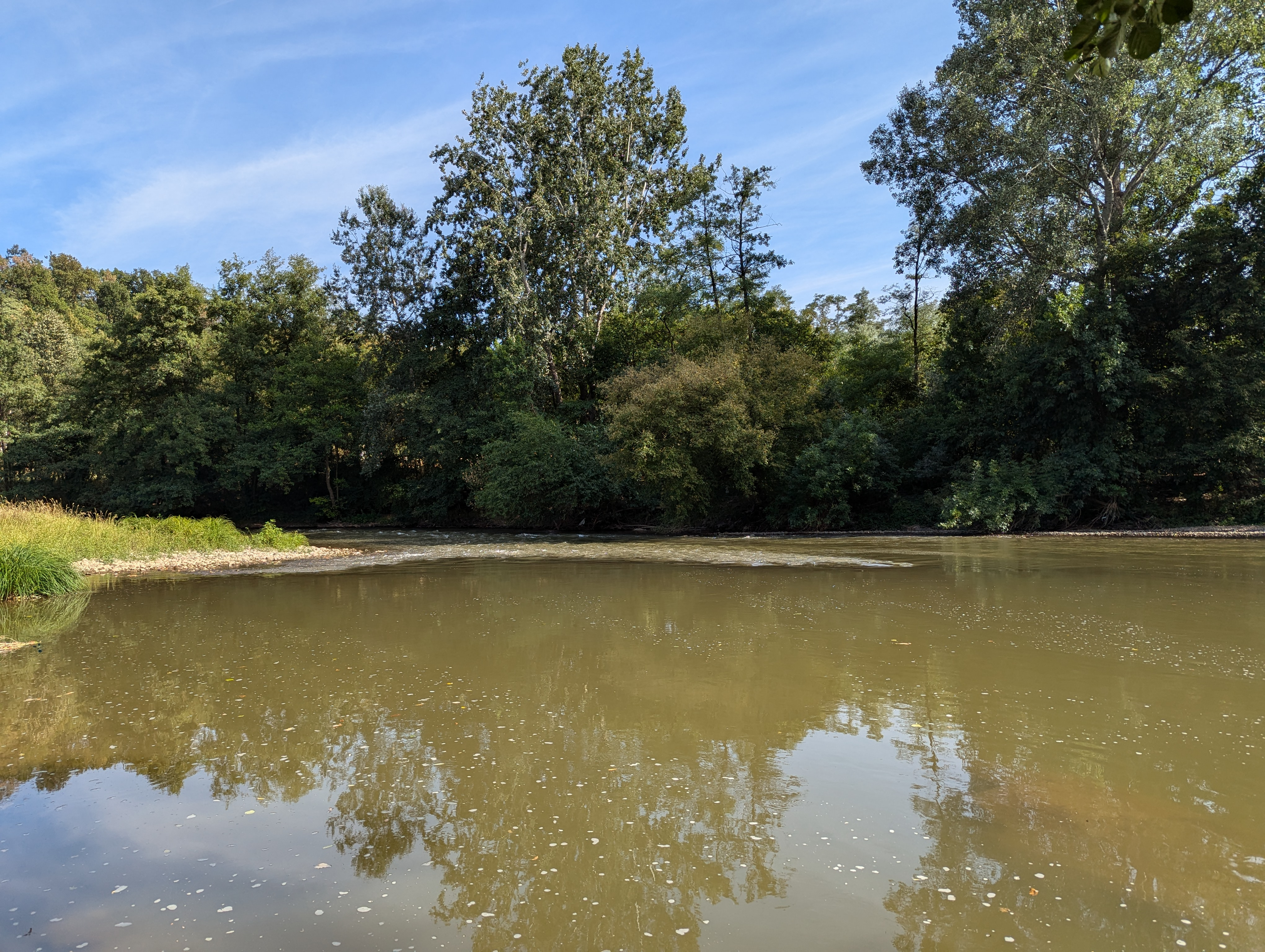
- Ibar in Progorelica
- Interactive map of Progorelica
- Country: Serbia
- District: Raška District
- Municipality: Kraljevo
- Time zone: UTC+1 (CET)
  - Summer (DST): UTC+2 (CEST)

Progorelica is a village situated in Kraljevo municipality in Serbia.
