= Zadruga =

South Slavic type of rural community

A zadruga (Cyrillic: задруга, pronounced [ˈzâːdruɡa]) refers to a type of rural community historically common among South Slavs.

The term has been used by the Communist Party of Yugoslavia to designate their attempt at collective farming after World War II.

== History ==
Originally, generally formed of one extended family or a clan of related families, the zadruga held its property, herds and money in common, with usually the oldest (patriarch) member ruling and making decisions for the family, though at times he would delegate this right at an old age to one of his sons.

Because the zadruga was based on a patrilocal system, when a girl married, she left her parents' zadruga and joined that of her husband. Within the zadruga, all of the family members worked to ensure that the needs of every other member were met.

The zadruga system eventually went into decline beginning in the late 19th century, as the largest zadrugas started to become unmanageable and broke into smaller zadrugas or formed traditional villages with related extended families after which they were named. Villages and neighbourhoods that are believed to originate from zadrugas can often be recognized by the patronymic suffixes, such as -ivci, -evci, -ovci, -inci, -ci, -ane, -ene, etc., based on family names.

This type of traditional, village style cooperation is similar to a late 19th-century Russian system called obshchina.

Since the early 21st century, the historicity of the zadruga system as a purported long-standing practice has been debated; there is little to no firm historical evidence to support that zadrugas were as common as once assumed; the system is not discussed in print in any written source from the region until the early 19th century while the word zadruga itself has only been documented since 1818 in Serbo-Croatian writing.

== Current form ==
Today, in Croatia, "zadruga" is regulated by the Law (Official Gazette, nr. 34/2011, 125/2013, 76/2014, 114/2018 and 98/2019) as a special form of cooperation and shared ownership.

== See also ==
- Cooperative
- Obshchina

== Sources ==
- Миленко С Филиповић (1945). Несродничка и предвојена задруга. Смиљево.
- Срђан Шљукић (2009). Сељак и задруга у равници. Mediterran Publ. ISBN 978-86-86689-33-7.
- Momčilo Isić (2001). Seljaštvo u Srbiji: pt. 1., 2 Socijalno-ekonomski položaj seljaštva. Institut za noviju istoriju Srbije. ISBN 9788670050259.
