= Knežina (Ottoman Serbia) =

Rural self-governing institution in Ottoman Serbia

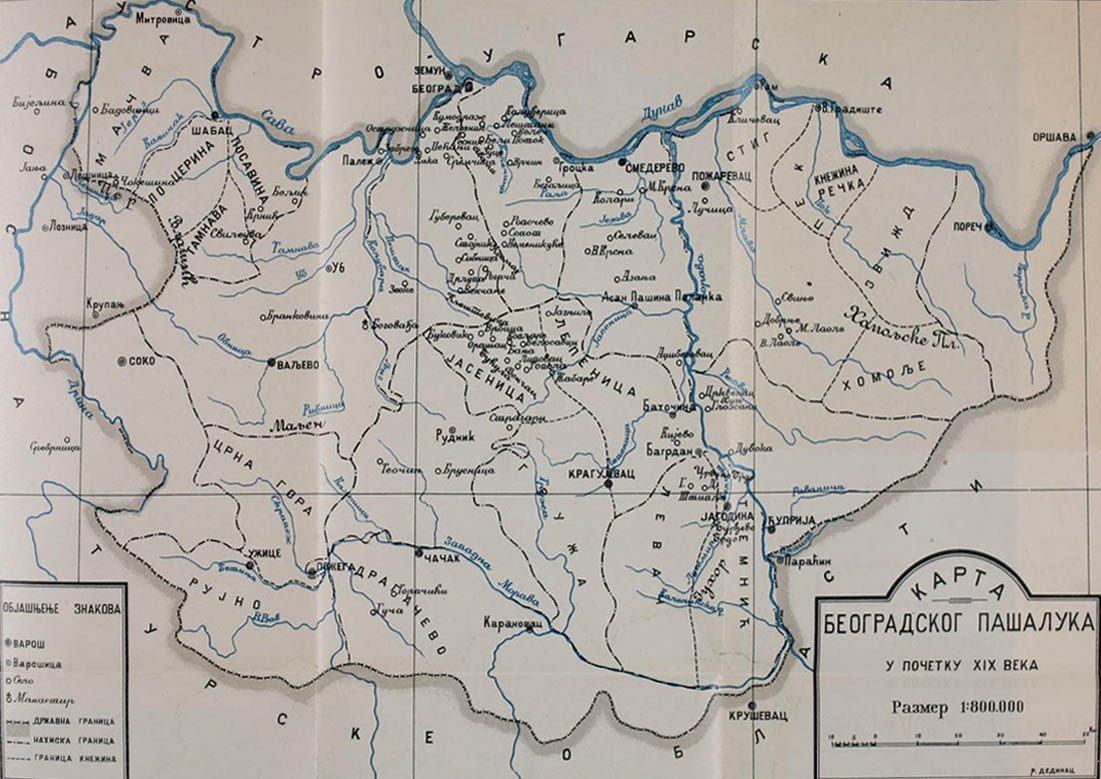
Belgrade Pashalik with nahiyas and knežina (in Serbian).

The knežina (Serbian: кнежина, from knez) was a rural self-governing institution among Serbs in the Belgrade Pashalik (now central Serbia) of the Ottoman Empire in the 18th century. As a Christian (rayah) institution supervised by the Ottoman nahiye officials, it had very limited authority and rights. Two organs constituted the knežina, the assembly as per customary law, which cared for important local issues, such as judicial disputes, monasteries and roads, and the obor-knez (обор-кнез), a representative of a group of villages and intermediary between these and the government, who had basic tasks as collecting taxes and maintaining peace and order. The knežina became instrumental in the onset of the First Serbian Uprising as an organization for uprising and maintaining it. In Revolutionary Serbia (1804–13) it became an official administrative unit that also had a military function. Following the successful Second Serbian Uprising (1815) and establishment of the Principality of Serbia, it was an administrative unit with altered function. It was finally removed from the apparatus in the 1830s, replaced by the srez.

== History ==
=== 1739–1788 ===
The Sanjak of Smederevo (known as the "Belgrade Pashalik") was an Ottoman administrative unit (sanjak) further divided into the nahiya, the smallest administrative-territorial unit. The positions of Ottoman authority was the kadi (judges) and musellim (commanders and administrative officials), stationed in the nahiya fortress towns (varoš) and small towns (palanka). Popular assemblies were held in the nahiya mostly regarding taxation.

The Ottoman system returned to central Serbia in 1739, after decades of Habsburg rule. In the knežina and villages, the local self-governing continuously developed and affirmed itself during the second half of the 18th century, when the Ottoman system was weakened with anarchy in administration and economy. The knežina and villages became more important in the survival of the Serb people. All villages had a village knez (seoski knez), kmetovi (serfs) and village zbor (meetings). The village knez was chosen only to collect taxes and had no power or influence, while the serfs constituted the real village chiefs (starešina), and attained their status through honesty, intelligence and eloquence, according to philologist Vuk Karadžić. The serfs mainly performed the village police function and judged in minor disputes. Groups of villages were organized into knežina, where an obor-knez was elected for both state- and local self-governing functions.

There were two organs of popular self-government in the knežina, that of the knežina assembly and the knez of the knežina (obor-knez):

- knežina assembly (knežinska skupština), as per customary law, the highest organ of popular self-government, held regularly at a designated place, with members being village serfs (kmet) and other notables. Taxes were distributed according to local tradition and geo-economical circumstances. An obor-knez was elected in this context if he was held wise and favorable to their interests. The assembly cared for monasteries and churches, roads, judicial disputes and other important local issues. The assembly did not enjoy complete independence as it was supervised by the nahiya authorities, although it strove to maintain non-interference from the "Turks".
- knez of the knežina (knežinski knez, known as obor-knez, baš-knez), was used for the elected chiefs, commonly villagers who worked in agriculture or less commonly sold cattle, that were seated in their own villages and paid the same taxes as all rayah and had no extra pay for their title. They were elected at the knežina assembly and then sanctioned by the Ottoman authorities through berat (decree). They were mostly elected from the same family, the title thus becoming hereditary (primogeniture). Their main tasks were to distribute and collect taxes in their nahiya and act as delegates of Ottoman authority and then to resolve issues not regulated by Ottoman law. They thus had both a state- and local self-governing function. They were the intermediary between the commoners and Ottoman government, and were responsible for maintaining order and peace, judging in minor offenses and discussing in peasant disputes, although their decisions were not binding.

The Ottoman Empire saw growing political and economical crisis from the mid-18th century onwards; the European-Ottoman wars and new economic relations broke the Ottoman feudal system and effected the emancipation of Christians in the empire, especially in the Balkans. The sipahi were entrusted to restore Ottoman rule to the sanjak and relied on the small and still recovering Muslim population, and as a result, the Ottoman state lacked the strength and authority to counter the Janissaries' oppression and implementation of forced labour (known as chiflik) and extraordinary taxes. This led to deterioration of status and disruption of local self-government, which is why the Serbs under their obor-knezes sided with Austria in the coming war (1788).

The 1741 defter bears witness to the depopulation of the knežine throughout the Sanjak of Smederevo, especially along the highways in the central nahiyas, such as Levač, Rudnik and Lepenica. There were an estimated 7–15 villages in each knežina, while the area of the smaller nahiyas such as Braničevo, Kolubara and Železnik coincided with the territory of knežina. There were at least 33 knezes (as listed in the defter).

=== Austro-Turkish War and the Janissaries ===
As the Serbs were subject to forced labour, and had endured terror from authorities, forced migration, epidemics and starvation, they were eager to form alliances with Christian states in order to liberate themselves. The Ottoman-Russian war broke out in 1787 and Austria joined in February 1788. In 1787 the Serbs were violently disarmed by the Ottoman authorities during the Austrian war preparations, with terror carried out by military and bashi-bazouk irregular units leading to people fleeing across the Sava and Danube to Austrian territory and forming the Serbian Free Corps. Serb volunteers actively engaged Ottoman troops and liberated many towns in central Serbia, however, much needed aid and equipment was denied. Successful Ottoman counter-operations and terror upon the Serb population led to further refugees to Austria, numbering 50,000 by the end of June 1788. A truce was signed that lasted to the summer of 1789 when the Austrians conquered Belgrade and advanced in the interior, however, the Austrian court increasingly sought to end the conflict and peace was signed in August 1791.

The Porte gave amnesty to participants on the Austrian side and banned the Janissaries from the Pashalik. The Janissaries had earlier been part of the backbone of Ottoman military power but had lost their importance in the 18th century, becoming a source of disorder, due to lack of discipline and bad morals. The Janissaries revolted in 1793 and raided the lands, and briefly occupied Belgrade. In order to rid the threat of the Janissaries, a Serb militia in Ottoman service was established, numbering some 15,000, many of whom had gained military training and experience in the last war. The militia was led by the knezes and the supreme commander Stanko Arambašić. The Janissaries were decisively defeated by the militia in another attempt to occupy the Pashalik, which showed the militia was well-organized, disciplined and trained. As a reward, the Porte had issued firmans (decrees) which acknowledged Serb self-governing privileges, better socio-economic status, the right to renew and build churches, and to lead security detachments for maintaining road safety and apprehending robbers. Muslim retaliation and entry to Serb villages was forbidden, as to not make way for conflict.

The tenure of Hadji Mustafa Pasha (t. 1793–1801) as Vizier of Belgrade is remembered positively among the Serbs for the improved situation in the Pashalik through reforms, essentially for the return of their self-governing rights and having given over all matters regarding the rayah to the Serb chiefs. The kadi and pasha himself were only authorizing the control of the knezes regarding financial matters. Mustafa Pasha did not decide in any matters regarding the rayah without discussing with the knezes. Instances of abuse were investigated and when they were right, Mustafa Pasha acted; as an example, the knez of Tamnava knežina and Free Corps veteran Aleksa Nenadović had 18 evil musellim and kadi replaced.

The borders of a knežina changed as per the villagers wishes, for instance, the Podgor knežina was left without a knez following the war and asked knez Aleksa Nenadović to be put under his supervision, and to appoint a lesser knez. Nenadović could not take responsibility for that knežina, even though he had been an arbitrator there for years, and asked them to choose one from their midst. They couldn't decide and asked him to let Joko from Rabas, in Nenadović's knežina, be their knez. Nenadović thus decided that Rabas be joined into Podgor and Joko became its knez.

During Ottoman rule, there were the following knežina in the Sanjak of Smederevo:

- Šabac nahiya: Mačva, Pocerina, Tamnava, Posavina.
- Valjevo nahiya: Valjevska Tamnava–Posavina, Jadar, Ljig/Podgor.
- Užice nahiya: Užička Crna Gora, Rujno.
- Požega nahiya: Dragačevo, Podibar, Čačanska Morava.
- Rudnik nahiya: Rudnička Morava, Crna Gora–Podgora.
- Kragujevac nahiya: Lower Gruža, Upper Gruža, Lepenica, Jasenica.
- Jagodina nahiya: Levač, Temnić.
- Požarevac nahiya: Braničevo, Mlava, Stig, Pek, Rečka, Zvižd, Omolje.
- Ćuprija nahiya: Resava (whole of Ćuprija nahiya).
- Belgrade, Soko, Grocka, Smederevo, Poreč nahiyas were as the Ćuprija nahiya made up of knežina that included all of the nahiya.

In the Sanjak of Zvornik, there were Jadar and Rađevina (located on the right, Serbian side of the Drina). In the Sanjak of Vidin, there was Crna Reka.

This significant improvement to the Serbs' status did not last long, as new conflicts with Janissaries arose and the threat of the French in Egypt made the Porte allow for the return of Janissaries in early 1799. The Janissaries renewed terror, captured Belgrade and Hadji Mustafa Pasha in July 1801, murdered him in December, then ruled the Pashalik. The leading Janissaries, called the Dahije, abolished the Serbs' firmans, banished unsupportive sipahi and invited Muslims from neighbouring sanjaks which they used to control the Serbs. The Dahije broke the system and ruled in all spheres, appointing their own Muslim soubashi in every village. The banished sipahi and loyal Muslims organized a rebellion against the Janissaries with Serb support in mid-1802, but it failed, resulting in further oppression. The Dahije learnt of a conspiracy between the Serbs and Mustafa Pasha's associates (who wanted revenge) to rise against the Dahije, forged in 1803, as well as a letter to the Austrian military in Zemun. Aleksa Nenadović in Valjevo and Karađorđe in Šumadija, both Free Corps and militia veterans, planned an uprising.

The Dahije began to monitor Serbs after learning of the conspiracy. After learning of further talks between Serbian knezovi and imperial Turks in Šumadija at the beginning of 1804, and perhaps receiving threats from the Porte, the Dahije decided to kill Serb leaders in order to thwart a rebellion against them. The victims were obor-knezes, knezes, buljubašas and other chosen people. While murders began in December, most leaders were killed between 23–29 January. The "Slaughter of the Knezes" led to the uprising against the Dahije in 1804 and the start of the Serbian Revolution.

=== Serbian Revolution ===
In the beginning of the uprising braver locals gathered around their starešina (chief, elder), gradually expanding with rebels joining of good will or through pressure. The first bands gathered around leaders such as Karađorđe, Stanoje Glavaš and Janko Katić in Šumadija, Jakov Nenadović in Kolubara and Milenko Stojković in Pomoravlje. With the expansion of the uprising, the gathering of troops was through the knez, who often also was the starešina, or another notable or merchant, such as Milan Obrenović, Mladen Milovanović, Teodosije Marićević and others. Archpriest Matija Nenadović described the starešina as coming from "the wealthiest of Serbs, who was a knez, merchant, priest, kmet (serf) or otherwise wealthy, having a good patrimony, zadruga, plenty of livestock, mills and other income" and who could gather men and arm them. The first starešine of the not yet organized army were recognized by the commoners in distinguished individuals in their midst, however, as the battles continued and the rebels became better organized, distinction through battle singled out people fit for leadership.

The knežina became an administrative unit in Revolutionary Serbia. All of the territory was divided into knežina, where a vojvoda (general) was appointed to lead. Thus, Stojan Čupić was the vojvoda of Mačva, Miloš Stojićević of Pocerina, Antonije Bogićević of Jadar, Hajduk Veljko of Negotinska Krajina, Radovan Grbović of Kolubara, archpriest Milutin Ilić of Dragačevo, etc. The knežina territory was somewhat changed during Karađorđe's rule, for instance the Belgrade nahija was divided into three (Turija, Posavina, Kolubara). The knežina was further divided into smaller units known as srezovi, which were made up of a smaller number of villages and headed by a veliki buljubaša ("great"), later designated kapetan (captain), that had under him several mali buljubaša ("lesser"). The knez of the knežina remained alongside the vojvoda, but had lesser functions than during the Ottoman era.

=== Principality of Serbia ===
With the quelling of the uprising and return of Ottoman rule in 1813, the original nahiyas were restored and the knežina returned to its original state. With the successful Second Serbian Uprising (1815), Serbia was led by "supreme knez" Miloš Obrenović, who continued using the nahiyas and knežina, but lowered the number of nahiyas from 15 to 12 (later adjoined by six nahiyas in 1833). Every nahija had several knežina in it. In the beginning of Miloš's reign, the knežina was also called srez, as per the srez of Karađorđe's reign. On 1 November 1815 the National Chancellery (narodna kancelarija) sent commissaries to all knežina for the appointment of a knez in each by Miloš. Where the name of the knežina insufficiently described the geography, and of new knežina, they were named after the holders (such as Bobovčeva, Rakina, Dabića, Stankovića, Gošnića, Katića, Živkovića, etc). In all nahiyas, a nahijski knez (nahiya knez), also known as glavni knez ("head") and obor-knez, were appointed with diplomas. The knežina knez was sub-ordinated these nahija knezes, who were governors appointed by Miloš. As the nahija knez, the knežina knez was appointed by Miloš with diplomas. Miloš's knezes were veterans that were loyal to him, and they were paid salary.

The National Assembly (narodna skupština) permanently included nahija knezes (nahijski knezovi), chancellery knezes (knezovi narodne kancelarije), knežina knezes (knežinski knezovi), while also kmets (serfs), clergy, and other notables could be called in. Most often, Miloš called upon the nahija knezes who in turn called on their knežina knezes and serfs, and other chosen people. There were three types of state assemblies in Serbia: those which only the main knezes participated in; assemblies where apart from knezes also other chosen people, who understood national affairs; people's assemblies, in which also kmets participated. The National Chancellery, made up of at least three knezes, acted as an intermediary between the Porte and Miloš, as a judicial court in issues that the nahija knezes were unable to solve, as organizer of supplies and tributes to the Belgrade Vizier, as participant in the state tax collection, and as a political advisory to Miloš.

The nahija knezes had administrative, military, financial and judicial duties, and when the knežina knezes could not solve an issue, the nahija knezes judged in the matter. While the nahija knezes were responsible for verdicts, they could authorize knežina knezes to carry them out.

The status of the knežina changed, as it represented an autonomous unit during Ottoman rule, it was now an administrative unit headed by a knez who was an official and implementer of Miloš's decisions. While the borders were decided by the villagers themselves during Ottoman rule, it was now decided by Miloš according to administrative need, ceding villages between knežina. Up until 1824 there were 45 knežina, and from 1824 to mid-1833 there were 42, from mid-1833 to 1834 there were 60, in 1834 there were 61 and in 1835 there were 54. The knežina was renamed kapetanija in 1830, and later srez, and the governors were called kapetan. Through this, the knežina and knez were finally removed from the apparatus.

== Notable people ==
Belgrade Pashalik

- Aleksa Nenadović (1749–1804), knez of Tamnava–Posavina knežina (1791–1804), in Valjevo nahiya.
- Ilija Birčanin (1764–1804), knez of Podgorje knežina (1791–1804), in Valjevo nahiya.
- Nikola Grbović (fl. 1793–1806), knez of Kolubara knežina (1793–1804), in Valjevo nahiya.
- Sima Marković (1768–1817), knez of Belgrade nahiya.
- Petar (d. 1804), knez of Resava knežina (fl. 1804), in Ćuprija nahiya.
- Stevan Palalija (d. 1804), knez in Begaljica.
- Ranko Lazarević (d. 1804), knez in Šabac nahiya.
- Nikola, knez in the Rudnik nahiya.

Revolutionary

- Stevan Sinđelić, knez of Resava knežina (whole Ćuprija nahija)
- Milić Kedić, knez of Podgorje knežina, in Valjevo nahija
- Milisav Đorđević, knez of the Crna Reka nahija
- Sima Marković, vojvoda, knez of Posavska-Beogradska knežina, in Belgrade nahija
- Aksentije Miladinović, knez of Kolubarska-Beogradska knežina, in Belgrade nahija
- Vasa Čarapić, vojvoda, knez of Gročanska knežina (–1806), in Gročanska nahija
- Tanasije Čarapić, vojvoda, knez of Gročanska knežina (1806–10), in Gročanska nahija
- Ilija Čarapić, vojvoda, knez of Gročanska knežina (1810–13), in Gročanska nahija
- Janko Katić, knez of Turijska/Kosmajska knežina (–1806), in Gročanska nahija
- Marko Katić, knez of Turijska/Kosmajska knežina (1806–10), in Gročanska nahija
- Stevan Katić, knez of Turijska/Kosmajska knežina (1810–13), in Gročanska nahija
- Nikola Katić, knez of Turijska/Kosmajska knežina (1813), in Gročanska nahija

== See also ==
- Kodjabashis
- Obor-kapetan
- Assemblies of the Serbian Revolution

== Annotations ==
1. Out of all Serb-inhabited areas in the Rumelia Eyalet, the most homogenous was the Pashalik of Belgrade. Central Serbia was massively depopulated with the Great Serbian Migrations (1690 and 1739) to Habsburg territories. Following these migrations, Šumadija (the larger part of the Pashalik), was settled by Serbs from Raška, Kosovo and Metohija, Vardar valleys, Montenegrin Highlands, Herzegovina. The old and new population merged in their patriarchal society, with the newcomers giving purer forms of patriarchal culture and a much more independent stance towards the Ottoman government.
2. Scholarship has noted some similarities and also clear differences, with the pleme (tribe) system in Montenegro and Herzegovina and the knežina of the 18th century. While both are based on popular self-government, there are specific economic, geographical and political circumstances setting them apart. The pleme is based on familial community with a military character that sprung from the life in mountainous shepherding land without strong Ottoman apparatus, which is not the case with the knežina, established on arable land with farming as main occupation, easily accessed by the Ottoman authorities, but also various outlaws.
3. The Ottoman Turks adopted the knez title for village chiefs, and in order to differentiate them from those of the knežina, obor-knez (from German: ober, lit. 'upper'), baš-knez (from Turkish: baṣ, lit. 'head') and veliki knez ("great") were used.
4. Among the victims that were knezes: in the Grocka nahiya, Stevan Andrejević Palalija from Begaljica, Marko Čarapić from Beli Potok; in the Belgrade nahiya, Stanoje Mihailović from Zeoke; in the Valjevo nahiya, Aleksa Nenadović of Tamnava, Ilija Birčanin of Podgor; in the Zvornik nahiya, Radosav Kalabić of Jadar; in the Ćuprija nahiya, Petar from Gložane; in the Požarevac nahiya, Rajica from Zabrđe; in the Smederevo nahiya, Teofan from Orašje, Jovan from Landovo, Maksim from Selevce; in the Kragujevac nahiya, Spasoje Ilić of Lapovo.

== Sources ==
- Bodrožić, Đuro (2019). "Nacionalna država u Prvom srpskom ustanku". Politička revija. 62 (4): 87–107.
- Đorđević, Tihomir R. (1921). "Кнежине у Србији за време прве владе Кнеза Милоша". Српски Књижевни Гласник, Нова Серија. 4: 508–518, 600–611.
- Gavrilović, Andra (1904). "Сеча кнезова". Црте из историје ослобођења Србије. Belgrade: Нздање дворске књижаре Мите Стајића у Београду. pp. 7–42.
- Guzina, Ružica (1955). Кнежина и постанак српске буржоаске државе. Култура.
- Jevtić, Dragoš (1981). "УСПОСТАВЉАЊЕ И СПРОВОЂЕЊЕ ЦЕНТРАЛИСТИЧКОГ СИСТЕМА УПРАВЕ У СРБИЈИ 1804—1888". Анали Правног Факултета У Београду. 29 (5–6): 285–310.
- Karadžić, Vuk (1827). "кнезови". Danica. Zabavnik. Mechitaristendr. p. 96.
- Miljković-Matić, Jelena (2013). "УЛОГА КНЕЖИНЕ У НАСТАНКУ НАЦИОНАЛНОГ ИДЕНТИТЕТА". Политичка Ревија. 4. Институт за политичке студије: 31–38.
- Mišković, Jovan (2021) [1895]. "Српска војска и војевање за време устанка, од 1804–1815 године". Приступне Беседе Српских Академика: 1886-1947. 2. Српска академија наука и уметности: 400–426.
- Nedeljković, Slaviša D.; Đorđević, Miloš Z. (2015). "ПОЛИТИЧКЕ ПРИЛИКЕ У БЕОГРАДСКОМ ПАШАЛУКУ У ПРЕДВЕЧЕРЈЕ СРПСКЕ РЕВОЛУЦИЈЕ (1787-1804)". Teme. XXXIX (3). Niš: 965–969.
- Novaković, Stojan (1904). Ustanak na dahije 1804. Belgrade: Državna štamparija.
- Pavlović, Miroslav (2016). "Фактичко-правни положај Смедеревског санџака после 1739. године". In Rudić, Srđan; Pavlović, Lela (eds.). Српска револуција и обнова државности Србије: двеста година од Другог српског устанка [Serbian Revolution and Renewal of Serbian Statehood: Two Hundred Years since the Second Serbian Uprising] (in Serbian). Beograd: Istorijski institut. pp. 9–18. ISBN 978-86-7743-116-7 – via Google Books.
- Svirčević, Miroslav (2003). "Кнежинска и сеоска самоуправа у Србији 1739–1788". Balcanica (XXXII–XXXIII): 183–197.
- Svirčević, Miroslav (2004). "Миграције у Србији XVIII века и установе патријархалног друштва". Гласник Етнографског Института САНУ. LII. САНУ Београд: 311–.
- Svirčević, Miroslav (2011). Локална управа и развој модерне српске државе: од кнежинске до општинске самоуправе [Тhе Origins of Local Government and the Development of the Modern Serbian State]. Balkanološki institut SANU. ISBN 978-86-7179-072-7.
