= Stanoje Glavaš =

Serbian hajduk and commander (1763–1815)

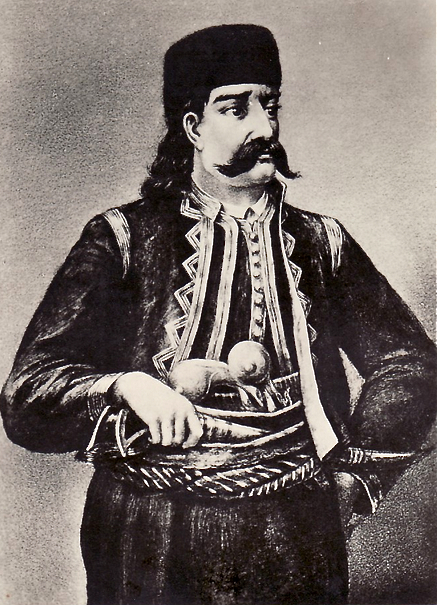
- Illustration by Đura Jakšić
- Born: Stanoje Jovanov; 21 February 1763; Glibovac, Ottoman Empire (modern Serbia)
- Died: 15 February 1815 (aged 51); Baničina, Ottoman Empire (modern Serbia)
- Military career
- Allegiance: Hajduk Bands (brigandage, 1777–1790s); Habsburg Monarchy (1790s); Serbian revolutionaries (1804–1815)
- Service years: 1790s–1815
- Conflicts: First Serbian Uprising (1804–1813); Deligrad (1806); Hadži-Prodan's Uprising (1814)

Stanoje Stamatović (Serbian Cyrillic: Станоје Стаматовић), known as Stanoje Glavaš (Станоје Главаш; 21 February 1763 – 15 February 1815) was a Serbian hajduk and hero in the First Serbian Uprising.

== Life ==
Glavaš was born in 1763 in the village of Glibovac, near Smederevska Palanka, at the time part of the Sanjak of Smederevo, Ottoman Empire. In his youth, he was a gentleman's tailor in Smederevska Palanka. He never married, which was unusual for small town business owners of the time in Serbia. For a time, he shared a house with a certain other confirmed bachelor, originally from Negotin, one Borisav Petrović, and they had a joint enterprise for constructing adobe houses. During this time Karađorđe Petrović spent several months in Glavaš's house, either as an apprentice or as a hajduk in hiding during wintertime.

Later, Glavaš was the co-leader, with Stanko Arambašić and Lazar Dobrić, of a hajduk company based in Austrian-held Syrmia, which frequently crossed the Ottoman border, and attacked Ottoman forces and caravans in the Sanjak of Smederevo in the 1790s (including Koča's frontier rebellion).

In 1804, at the eve of the First Serbian Uprising, Glavaš, Karađorđe and several other leaders gathered at Orašac to organize the revolt (see Serbian Revolution). Glavaš was suggested as leader. He refused the offer, opting for Karađorđe instead. In December 1806, commanders Vujica, Mladen Milovanović and Glavaš commanded an army of 18,000 soldiers to defend the Serbs at the Battle of Deligrad. The fight ended in Serbian victory, with Ibrahim Bushati, pasha of Shkodër, signing a 6-week truce. He led a company of around 3,000 men which liberated Prokuplje and Kuršumlija. His company guarded the Morava Valley and fought the Ottomans in the mountains of Niš and Novi Pazar for two months before being captured. He was killed by the Ottomans on 15 February 1815, after the demise of Hadži-Prodan's Uprising. His severed head was on display at the Kalemegdan along with other Serbian leaders.

== Legacy ==
In his home town, there is a street and an elementary school named after him. He is the subject of a Serbian heroic play written by Đura Jakšić, which was widely shown throughout Serbia in the 19th century.

As a young widow, his mother remarried when he was about 12 or 13 (and that's when he became a tailor's apprentice) so he had several half-siblings, many years younger to whom he played a kind of fatherly role in his mature age, especially as he did not have his own family. He also had full (i.e. not half-) brother and sister from his mother's first marriage (to his father) and as a leader of the Serbian Revolution, he facilitated the marriage of his niece Marija (daughter of his brother) to Hajduk Veljko Petrović, a fellow-hero and leader of the revolution (and there are surviving descendants of that union).

== See also ==
- List of Serbian Revolutionaries
