= Battle of Čačak (1805) =

Battle part of the first Serbian uprising

- Part of the First Serbian Uprising
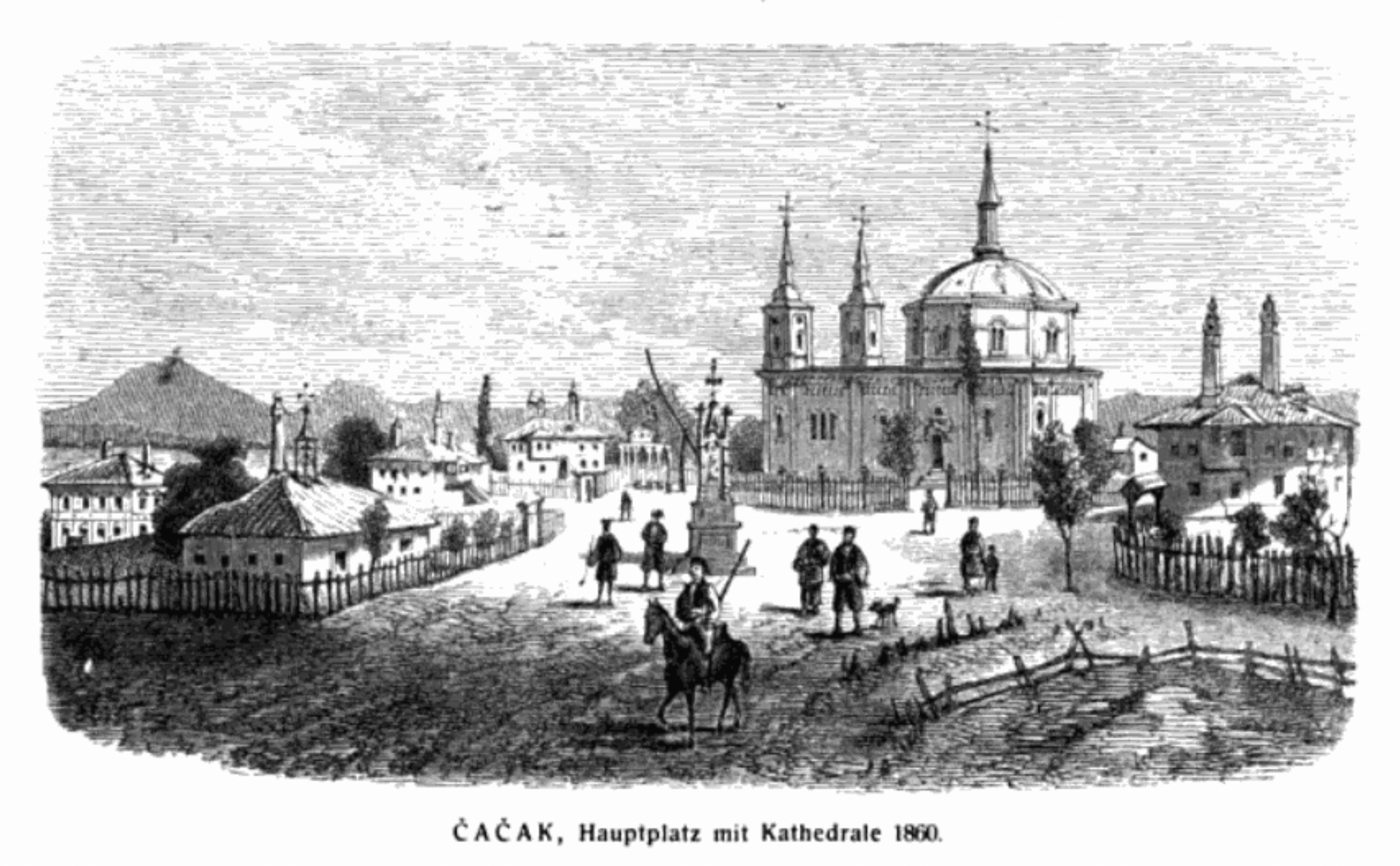
- Illustration of Čačak in 1860
Date	5 April 1805
Location	Čačak, Sanjak of Smederevo, Ottoman Empire (today Serbia)
Result	Serbian victory
Territorial changes	Čačak in rebel hands

Belligerents
Revolutionary Serbia	Dahije

Commanders and leaders
Lazar Mutap; Milić Drinčić	Sali-aga

Units involved
Rudnik and Čačak nahiyas	Janissaries; Čačak deli and local soldiers

Strength
350	Far more

Casualties and losses
Lesser	Greater

The Battle of Čačak was undertaken by the Serbian rebel army detachments led by Lazar Mutap and Milić Drinčić against the town of Čačak, in the hands of the Dahije (renegade Janissaries). Čačak was situated in the frontier of rebel territory and serving as an entrance point to Šumadija. Although numerically superior, the Turks failed in an attack on the Serb trench and in the Serb siege fled the town in the night after being fiercely attacked.

== Background ==
The Serbian rebel army under the command of supreme commander Karađorđe took over Rudnik in March 1804 and forced the Dahije Sali-aga and his men to flee to Čačak. Sali-aga, a well-known oppressor, had 200–300 men with him. The Čačak nahiya was not all caught up in the rebellion, thus, Karađorđe ordered Lazar Mutap and Arsenije Loma of the Rudnik nahiya to rise up the Čačak nahiya. They were to attack, burn or steal Turk property, and kill or expel the Dahije-supporting inn-keepers (handžije), subaşi (assistants), and even sipahi (cavalry). Čačak was to be taken and its "Turk" (Muslim) inhabitants expelled, in order for the town and area to remain in firm Serb hands. According to K. Nenadović, the Čačak Turks "gave reasons" to attack the town.

== History ==
Lazar Mutap and Milić Drinčić, both ranked buljubaša (captain), with command over the knežina of Rudnička Morava and Crna Gora–Podgora, respectively, recognized that Čačak didn't have that many soldiers. Čačak had sent troops to aid in the defense of Rudnik under the command of Sali-aga, and as the town was situated in the frontier of Šumadija, the main rebel territory, it needed to be liberated and the Turks pushed out. The decision was made prior to official military plans to expand the rebellion in the Požega nahiya, as per the later Pećani assembly. While moving in the Čačak nahiya with their bands, Mutap and Loma were approached by archpriest Milutin Ilić from Guča and Novačić from Goračić who had up to 700 men with them. The men entrenched at the Ljubić hill, on the west banks of the Morava towards Čačak, and Čačak was then held under siege.

The Čačak Turk troops sortied, crossed the Morava and attacked the trench, during which time Milić Drinčić arrived with 300 cavalry that proved decisive in this battle, in which the Turks numbered three times more but fell in large numbers. The Turks fled back to Čačak and many drowned in the Morava. Mutap and Drinčić gathered 350 men of the Rudnik and Čačak nahiyas, all battle-ready and well-equipped. Čačak was not ready for the immediate Serb counter-attack on the town. The rebels fiercely attacked the town on 5 April [O.S. 24 March] 1805. The attack began a day prior to the Orthodox feast day of Annunciation. Drinčić distinguished himself in the battle, as well as a soldier in Mutap's unit, Jovan Kursula, who was in the first line, and later became known as one of the most heroic rebels. There were far more Turks than Serbs, which helped the resistance to the attack, however, lucky enough for the Serbs who believed that the battle would take longer, the Turks decided to flee the town in the evening when the shootout started to calm down. On the third day of engagement, the Turks fled to Karanovac, Užice, and Požega. The town fell into Serb hands and all of the Čačak nahiya was in rebellion. A permanent garrison was put up at the trench by the town church.

Next in line of Dahije holdings was Karanovac, which was besieged on 29 June.

== Aftermath and legacy ==
The village mosque, originally a church that was converted likely in the 15th century, was remade a church following the takeover of the town. In 1808 the town was described as having 200 households. It was retaken by the Ottomans in 1813, and the church was converted once again. It was liberated again in 1815 during the Second Serbian Uprising.

== See also ==
- Timeline of the Serbian Revolution

== Annotations ==
1. It is known in historiography as the "liberation of Čačak" (Serbian: Ослобођење Чачка/Oslobođenje Čačka), "battle of Čačak" (Бој на Чачку/Boj na Čačku).
2. According to K. Nenadović (1884), 250 men of Mutap and Drinčić attacked the town of Čačak which had 15,000 Turk inhabitants under the command of the "Pasha of Leskovac". K. Protić (1893) gave the number 350 and described the Turk forces as far larger.

== Sources ==
- Batalaka, Lazar Arsenijević (1898). Историја српског устанка. Vol. I. Izd. Batalakinoga fonda.
- Bojović, Radivoje D. (1974). "Битка на Чачку 1815.године" (PDF). Зборник радова народног музеја. V. Чачак: Народни музеј: 87–112.
- Matović, Marijana, ed. (2019). ФРАГМЕНТИ О ЧАЧКУ (PDF). Vol. II. Народни музеј Чачак.
- Milićević, Milan Đ. (1888). Поменик знаменитих људи у српског народа новијега доба. Издање Чупићеве задужбине – via Archive.org.
- Nenadović, Konstantin N. (1903) [1883]. Живот и дела великог Ђорђа Петровића Кара-Ђорђа. Vol. I (2 ed.). Belgrade: Штампа Савића и Комп. – via Archive.org.
- Nenadović, Konstantin N. (1884). Живот и дела великог Ђорђа Петровића Кара-Ђорђа. Vol. II (1 ed.). Vienna: У Штампарији Јована Н. Вернаја – via Google Books.
- Protić, Kosta (1893). "Ратни догађаји из првога српског устанка под Карађорђем Петровићем 1804—1813". Годишњица Николе Чупића. XIII. Državna štamparija.
