= Battle of Karanovac =

Battle part of the first Serbian uprising

- Part of the First Serbian Uprising
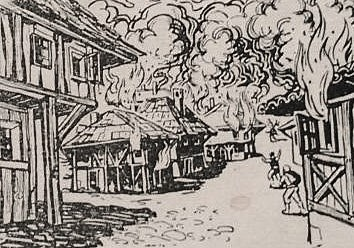
- Illustration of burning houses in Karanovac during the battle
Date	29 June – 11 July 1805
Location	Karanovac (now Kraljevo), Sanjak of Smederevo, Ottoman Empire (today Serbia)
Result	Serbian victory
Territorial changes	Karanovac handed over on 11 July 1805

Belligerents
Revolutionary Serbia	Dahije; Sanjak of Novi Pazar

Commanders and leaders
Karađorđe; Radič Petrović	Mehmed-aga Zgura †; Silahdar of Novi Pazar

Units involved
Combined nahija troops	Janissaries; Karanovac deli and local soldiers Novi Pazar deli

Casualties and losses
Small	Many

The Battle of Karanovac (Serbian: Бој на Карановцу/Boj na Karanovcu) was undertaken by the Serbian rebel army led by Karađorđe and Radič Petrović against the town of Karanovac (now Kraljevo), in the hands of the Dahije (renegade Janissaries) supported by the Sanjak of Novi Pazar. Karanovac was an important city in the province, laying in the south of rebel territory and serving as a reinforcement point of the Dahije and their allies. Left without support, the town surrendered after ten days and was handed over to the Serbs with the agreed emigration of the Muslim population to Novi Pazar.

== Background ==
Rebels of the Rudnik and Čačak nahiyas under Lazar Mutap and Milić Drinčić, numbering up to 350 men, attacked Čačak on 5 April [O.S. 24 March] 1805 and while outnumbered, the Turks fled the town in the night for Karanovac or Užice. Karanovac was located in a line of Ottoman forts and towns that separated Šumadija from Novi Pazar, Kosovo, Herzegovina and Macedonia and thus had a strategical importance. The town had a Muslim majority and Serb minority. Karanovac had a very good defensive fortification in the town. The Vizier (or vali) of the Sanjak of Novi Pazar, Kapetan-paša Ferhatagić, had sent soldiers to Karanovac to aid against the Serbian rebels. These combined troops were fit to defend the town, and the Karanovac Turks were known as heroes in battle. It would be a harder fight than in previous battles. Contemporary historian Triantafyllos Doukas called the Karanovac Turks "damned" and described the town as a "haven and residence of all those thieves who diverged from there in the environs".

At that time, Mehmed-aga Zgura, known as a courageous and brash deli, was at Karanovac and his bad behaviour towards Serbs prompted local ethnic conflict. A fight broke out outside Karanovac in which three Serbs and nine Turks died, with the Turks closing off Karanovac and ending any communication with Serb rayah living around the town. The news reached supreme commander Karađorđe. Karanovac awaited help from Novi Pazar and Užice, and believed that the Serbs would be attacked from Bosnia, Niš and Vidin. From the fortifications, Turks crossed the Morava and attacked villages several times, including ravaging the Ljubostinja monastery and the surrounding churches. The Karanovac soldiers and deli numbered more than 2,000, and they ravaged the surroundings and murdered people. Smaller rebel bands (cheta) were sent towards Karanovac to stop incursions into the unprotected Serb villages. One cheta under hajduk harambaša Stanoje Glavaš entrenched near the Western Morava awaiting the main rebel army. Radič Petrović, one of the most notable rebel leaders, an old and experienced Free Corps veteran, scouted the area in order to better plan the siege of Karanovac.

== History ==
Planning for the takeover of Karanovac, Karađorđe mustered an army on the Jasenica near Topola and in the valley of Gruža on the Topola–Karanovac road, in early June 1805. Among the present commanders in Karađorđe's army were Janko Katić, Sima Marković, Vasa Čarapić, Đuša Vulićević, Radič Petrović, Mladen Milovanović, archpriest Milutin Ilić, archpriest Matija Nenadović, Jovan Kursula, Arsenije Loma, Milić Drinčić and Lazar Mutap, as well as the archpriests of Kragujevac, Jagodina and Dragačevo and many other armed priests and monks. Also, Teodor Filipović, the first secretary of the Serbian Governing Council, accompanied Matija. Another detachment under Stanoje Glavaš assembled in the Gruža valley at the Vrbica fountain on the road nearer to Karanovac. Smaller units of Milan Obrenović and Jakov Nenadović were put on the borders of the Užice, Valjevo and Rudnik areas, stopping the Užice Turks from helping Karanovac. Karađorđe arrived at Jasenica on 24 June [O.S. 12 June] 1805 and set out with the army towards Karanovac the next day. On 26 June [O.S. 14 June] 1805 the army was adjoined by Gruža men in Gruža and they then stopped at Glavaš's hajduk camp outside Karanovac.

Stanoje Glavaš's detachment joined up with Karađorđe's army on the way and the rebel army went along the Morava river and on 28 June [O.S. 16 June] 1805 arrived at a height above the Morava towards Karanovac. The next day Radič Petrović crossed the Morava and with a vanguard dispersed Turk patrols and then a Karanovac sortie in which Mutap killed a deli. The rest of the army crossed the Western Morava and encircled Karanovac that same day, and in the evening were joined by Karađorđe and his staff. In the meantime, Mehmed-aga Zgura with many troops had sortied but he was killed and his head was put on a cow sent back into the town. Learning that the town had troops from the Sanjak of Novi Pazar who were to fight them, Karađorđe had sent a warning via Teodor Filipović to the vali Ferhatagić of Novi Pazar to not interfere in another pashalik, as Karađorđe had not touched his province. By then, the Karanovac Turks had retreated into the fortification, readying for better defense and aid from Užice and Novi Pazar.

The number of Serbian troops participating in the battle is unknown, it may have numbered 6,000, the figure given by K. Protić and K. Nenadović when describing the rebel army during these events: "6,000 men, out of which 1,000 were cavalry". The attack on the fortification commenced on 30 June [O.S. 18 June] 1805, according to the operation plan of Radič Petrović who led the siege. A cannon, the only one carried into the battle, bombarded the fortification followed by lines of constant fusillade, while all abandoned Turk houses in the town were set on fire. The cannon had been brought by Matija, and brought panic to the town. The burning town, made up mostly of wooden buildings, made it easier to fight in the dark. 700 buildings in the town burnt according to K. Nenadović. The shootout around and inside the fortification lasted all night between 30 June [O.S. 18 June] 1805 and 1 July [O.S. 19 June] 1805, and in the day of 1 July until noon, when the infantry assaulted the fortification. The Serbs lost 16 and 30 wounded in several failed attempts to take the parapet, due to the wide and deep trenches and heavy rain. Uzun-Mirko's head on the left side was grazed by a bullet, and this was the first of his many wounds.

The heavy rain forced the Serbian army to stop the assault, with soaked soldiers and muskets, and Karađorđe understood that they couldn't take the fortification with unusable muskets and only one cannon. The rain had soaked the gunpowder and rifles and the trouble gave birth to a proverb saying "It won't fire as if soaked at Karanovac". Karađorđe left Radič Petrović to hold the siege with a detachment, while he took the army across the Morava for rest and weapons maintenance, while he personally went to Topola to get more cannons on 3 July [O.S. 21 June] 1805. Radič Petrović fortified the right banks of the Ibar and took over the command of the Dragačevo troops of Milutin Ilić and chosen detachments closed in on the fortification. On 5 July [O.S. 23 June] 1805 Radič ordered that all Turk water mills on the Ibar be put on fire. On 6 July [O.S. 24 June] 1805, the silahdar (arms-bearer) of the Pasha of Novi Pazar arrived with an entourage at Karanovac that ordered the Novi Pazar troops present to stop fighting the Serbs and return immediately to Novi Pazar.

The fear of a stronger assault and the loss of help from Novi Pazar forced Karanovac to enter negotiations. There are slightly different versions on how it went.

- According to K. Protić, the Novi Pazar silahdar ordered the Novi Pazar troops at Karanovac to stop fighting and immediately return home. The following day of the departure of the silahdar, Karađorđe arrived at Karanovac with a six-pound cannon and plenty of ammunition. Seeing Karađorđe and realizing that Novi Pazar would no longer help them, Karanovac lost the will to fight and entered negotiations of surrender with Karađorđe. After some shorter discussions and bargains, the two sides agreed that all Karanovac Turks leave the town with their property for Novi Pazar and hand over the town to the Serbs, which was done on 11 July [O.S. 29 June] 1805, which was also the Orthodox feast day of St. Peter (Petrovdan). According to K. Nenadović (1883–84), the negotiations took place on 10 July [O.S. 28 June] 1805 and the next day on Petrovdan the Turks left the fortification and were escorted for Novi Pazar. According to B. Hrabak, Karađorđe had warned Novi Pazar already on 17 June [O.S. 5 June] 1805, the silahdar arrived on 6 July [O.S. 24 June] 1805, negotiations were held on 8–9 July [O.S. 26–27 June] 1805, and the Turks left the town on Petrovdan.
- According to M. Žutić, the silahdar arrived on 6 July [O.S. 24 June] 1805, ordered them to stop fighting and immediately return home, and enter negotiations regarding a peaceful retreat. The Serbian camp was in a bad state, and they didn't wish the Novi Pazar delegation to see this, so they held negotiations outside the camp. The rebels said that Karađorđe went to gather more troops and bigger cannons and was very upset that Novi Pazar Turks interfered in the Belgrade Pashalik, and that he would destroy Karanovac upon his return. This made the silahdar suggest that they call back Karađorđe and enter negotiations, that they would take all Turks with them, both those of Novi Pazar and Karanovac, and leave the town to the Serbs. This was a good solution for the Serbs, most importantly due to their plans to take Užice and the threat from the Sanjak of Niš. They messaged Karađorđe and informed Karanovac that they could leave in peace, but had to wait for Karađorđe's arrival. He arrived with two cannons, a war flag (barjak) and war drum, with the six-pound cannon inducing fear. Seeing that they lost help from Novi Pazar, and that Karađorđe would fiercely attack, they decided to leave the town, and sent their representatives and two Novi Pazar soldiers to conclude the conditions for their exit. On Petrovdan 11 July [O.S. 29 June] 1805, after giving Karađorđe a fine noble horse with red cloth to the hooves and handing over the town, the Turks were escorted by 50 rebels from the town.

The Karanovac Turks were escorted to Kurilovo, where they joined the Novi Pazar contingent to Novi Pazar, with all their property. Some refugees from Karanovac moved to Užice. According to a hatt-i humayun of Sultan Selim III dated 18 September 1805, the Serbian rebels had expelled 3,000 Muslims to the Bosnia Eyalet. The Turks had many losses in the battle.

There was celebration in the town, with lamb roast, and when the Turks were escorted past Serbian sentries Karađorđe invited all of the army into the town for the feast. A new town was then built in its place. Radič Petrović was proclaimed vojvoda of Karanovac following the battle. Through their distinction in the battle, Mutap and Loma became famous and sung about in epic poems. Antonije Ristić-Pljakić, who had killed the muselim of Karanovac back in 1804, moved to the town following its conquest.

== Aftermath and legacy ==
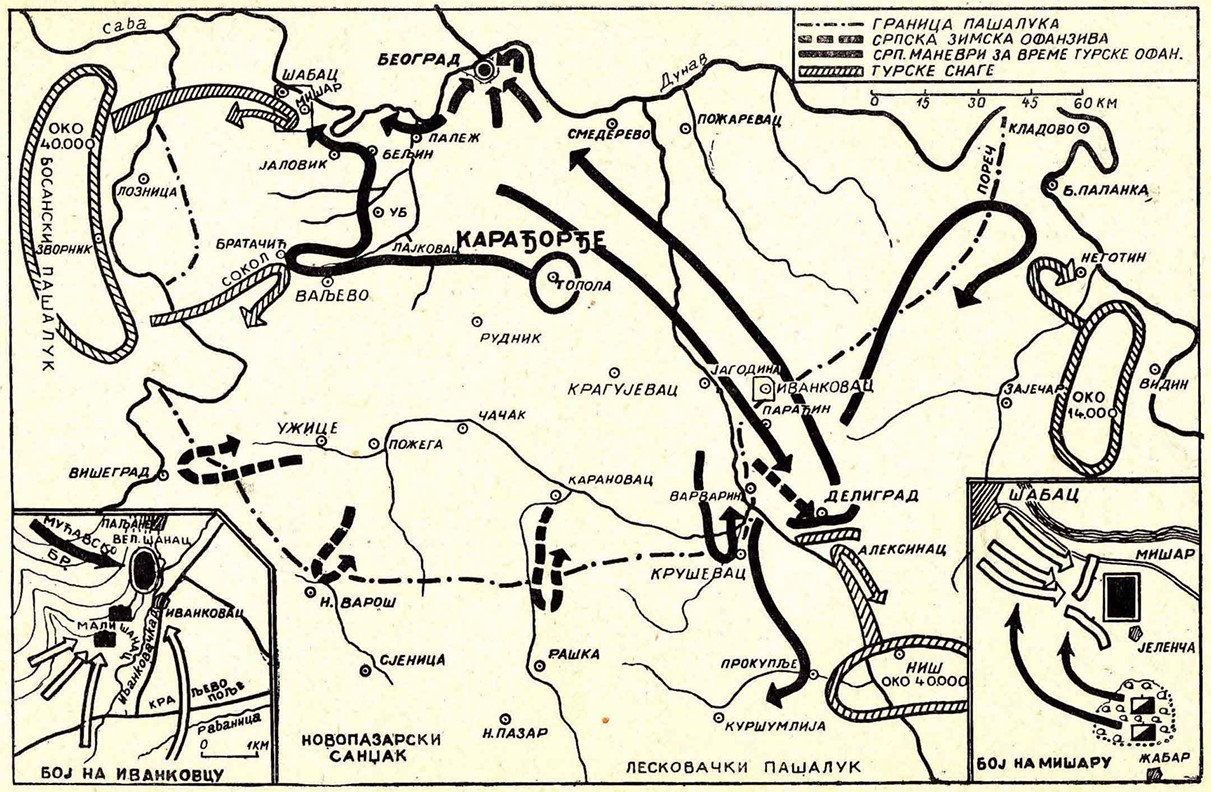
Map of operations in 1805.

During the battle of Karanovac, the Valjevo nahija troops of Jakov Nenadović and Rudnik nahija troops Milan Obrenović divided into smaller detachments that positioned themselves at the frontiers of the Valjevo, Užice and Rudnik areas, stopping reinforcements from Užice to the encircled Karanovac. One night during the battle, Užice soldiers attacked a Serb camp near Užice while these slept, killing 150 and dispersing that detachment, then proceeded to enter surrounding villages, burn down houses and kill 309 people. Karađorđe used these losses around Užice as a reminder to the rebels to take one's duty seriously and always be ready. When Karanovac fell into Serbian hands there was no longer a need for sentries towards Užice, and Jakov had informed Karađorđe in May 1805 that there was no fear of Ottoman Bosnian troops and that the Drina could be secured with a hundred soldiers. Karađorđe recommended Jakov to take Soko and Užice and to rise up all of the Soko, Užice and Zvornik nahiyas. Jakov called archimandrite Melentije Stevanović, who had risen and armed part of the Soko nahiya, Milan Obrenović with the Rudnik nahija army, and captain Radič Petrović to aid him in the capture of Užice, to begin with. An army was mustered under the command of Jakov and Milan which besieged Užice with cannons used at Karanovac.

Karanovac became an important military base for the Serbian rebel army, notably as a transit for operations in Novi Pazar and Nova Varoš and materiel. In 1808 Russian military reports, Karanovac had a garrison of 600 soldiers. The Karanovac Serbs were led by Radič Petrović towards Novi Pazar and they set up trenches in the southern front in early 1806, and they later supported the Dragačevo troops in the 1809 conquests of Nova Varoš and Sjenica and then operated in Pomoravlje.

There is a Serbian epic poem, boj na Karanovcu, about the battle. The sabre that allegedly was used to cut off the head of Mehmed-aga was in the possession of the family of obor-knez Đuka Filipović of Lepenica. The 2nd Brigade of the Serbian Army, based in Kraljevo, has 12 July as its feast day in honour of the battle of Karanovac.

== See also ==
- Timeline of the Serbian Revolution

== Annotations ==
1. According to Austrian officer and spy Paul von Mitesser (1784), Karanovac had 89 Turk and 11 Christian households. The main income of Karanovac at that time was brigandage, carried out by its Albanian immigrants from Scutari, Prizren and Vučitrn that had pushed aside the native Muslims and Serbs. While K. Protić wrote about 70 Turk houses at the time of the battle, historian B. Hrabak estimated a great expansion of the population in the period between 1784 and 1805, and noted the sultan's mention of 3,000 refugees and the Serbian mention of 700 houses.

== Sources ==
- Batalaka, Lazar Arsenijević (1898). Историја српског устанка. Vol. I. Izd. Batalakinoga fonda.
- Hrabak, Bogumil (1996). "Ваљевци у почетним годинама првог српског устанка" (PDF). Гласник Историјског архива Ваљево. 30. Istorijski arhiv Valjevo.
- Hrabak, Bogumil (1995). "Српски устаници и Новопазарски санџак (Рашка)". Историјски часопис. 40–41. Istorijski institut.
- Hrabak, Bogumil (1959). "Живот у Карановцу за време Првог српског устанка" (PDF). Зборник Историјског музеја Србије. 1. IMUS: 79-.
- Milićević, Milan Đ. (1888). Поменик знаменитих људи у српског народа новијега доба. Издање Чупићеве задужбине – via Archive.org.
- Nenadović, Konstantin N. (1903) [1883]. Живот и дела великог Ђорђа Петровића Кара-Ђорђа. Vol. I (2 ed.). Belgrade: Штампа Савића и Комп. – via Archive.org.
- Nenadović, Konstantin N. (1884). Живот и дела великог Ђорђа Петровића Кара-Ђорђа. Vol. II (1 ed.). Vienna: У Штампарији Јована Н. Вернаја – via Google Books.
- Protić, Kosta (1893). "Ратни догађаји из првога српског устанка под Карађорђем Петровићем 1804—1813". Годишњица Николе Чупића. XIII. Državna štamparija.
- Sibinović, Ana (2016), Надгробни споменик Милисава Чамџије [Tombstone of Milisav Čamdžija] (PDF), Завод за заштиту споменика културе града Београда - установа културе од националног значаја, ISBN 978-86-89779-29-5
- Žutić, Mihajlo (1967). "Бој на Карановцу, 1805" (PDF). Октобар. Слово.
