= Lazar Mutap =

Serbian commander

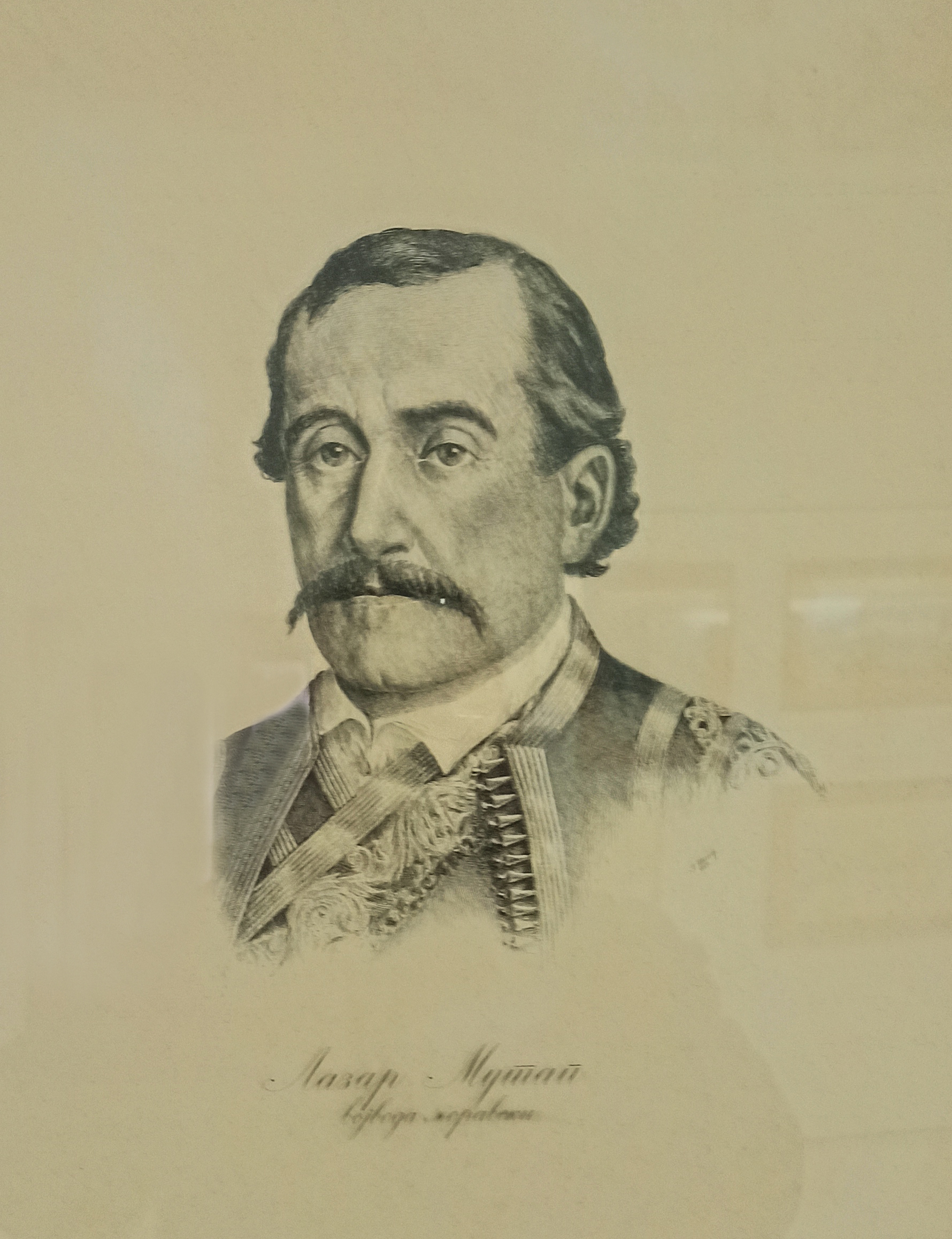
- Born: 1775; Prislonica, Sanjak of Smederevo, Ottoman Empire
- Died: 5 May 1815 (aged 39–40); Gornja Trepča, Ottoman Empire
- Cause of death: wounds
- Burial place: Vujan Monastery
- Military career
- Allegiance: Revolutionary Serbia
- Service years: 1804–1815
- Rank: buljubaša, vojvoda
- Nicknames: Lazo, Čačanin
- Units: Rudnik nahija army; Rudnička Morava (1804–); Dragačevo (1806–)
- Commands: Rudnik area
- Known for: commander in Rudnik
- Conflicts: First Serbian Uprising; Rudnik; Karanovac; Bratačić; Sjenica; Loznica; Second Serbian Uprising; Čačak

Lazar Mutap (Serbian: Лазар Мутап; 1775–1815) was a Serbian commander in the Rudnik area in the First Serbian Uprising (1804–13). He was the brother-in-arms of Arsenije Loma and Milić Drinčić, with whom he was promoted to buljubaša (captain) in the beginning of the uprising. Mutap was the top captain in the army of Milan Obrenović, the commander of the Rudnik nahija. He distinguished himself in many battles, such as Karanovac, Sjenica, Prijepolje, on the Drina, Loznica, and Deligrad. He was promoted to vojvoda (general) in 1811. He was in the nearest circle of vojvoda Miloš Obrenović during the outbreak of the Second Serbian Uprising (1815) and led the attack on important town Čačak, during which he was mortally wounded. He was buried in the narthex of the Vujan Monastery.

== Early life ==
Lazar was born in the village of Prislonica in the Rudnik nahiya. His paternal family, now known as the Mutapi, had ancestry from what is today Montenegro. The village was part of the Rudnička Morava knežina (Christian self-governing villages). He was a mutavdžija (bag-weaver) by trade, hence his nickname.

== First Uprising ==
=== Early years ===
After the Slaughter of the Knezes and Orašac Assembly (February 1804), the appointed leader of the uprising Karađorđe sent men and letters into the nahiyas to rally the people. In the Rudnik nahiya, Lazar Mutap, merchant Milan Obrenović, Arsenije Loma, and other notable Serbs were called to rally in their nahiya. Karađorđe was joined by Lazar Mutap, Arsenije Loma and Milić Drinčić and a number of Rudnik nahiya men ahead of, as well as Milan Obrenović with 60–70 men during, the attack on the town of Rudnik (27–28 February). Many "Turks" (Muslims) fell and the Dahije fled the town, and while the Turks were allowed to stay, they left for Užice. Due to the distinction of the Rudnik leaders, Mutap was proclaimed starešina (chief) and buljubaša (captain) of Rudnička Morava, Loma was proclaimed buljubaša of the Kačer knežina, and Drinčić was proclaimed buljubaša of the Crna Gora–Podgora knežina by Karađorđe. Milan Obrenović was proclaimed the starešina of the whole Rudnik nahija, and they were ordered to rise all of the nahija. Mutap was the top buljubaša of vojvoda Milan Obrenović. The Rudnik army under Milan attacked Jagodina in mid-March 1804 but were repelled, until Karađorđe mustered an army which then liberated it. The Rudnik army under Milan then participated in the takeover of Požarevac and Smederevo.

On 5 April [O.S. 24 March] 1805, 250 or 350 men under Mutap and Drinčić that were entrenched on the Ljubić hill and held Čačak under siege, fiercely attacked the town and forced the Turks to escape in the night, and took it over by the next day. Next, Mutap supported Karađorđe at Karanovac for several days, and through their distinction in the battle, Mutap and Arsenije Loma became famous and sung about in epic poems. He participated in the siege of Užice (1 August [O.S. 20 July] 1805), a Dahije stronghold, alongside Radič Petrović, Milutin Ilić, the Obrenović brothers Milan and Miloš, Luka Lazarević, Jakov Nenadović, Milovan Grbović, Cincar-Janko and Petar Moler. Mutap continued to distinguish himself in the battles of Sjenica, Prijepolje, on the Drina, Loznica, and Deligrad.

=== Distinction ===
After securing the Morava and hearing of an incoming Ottoman Bosnian army, Karađorđe focused on the Drina and ordered the generals of the Valjevo nahija to set out against Hadži-beg of Srebrenica who had crossed with 7,000 men. Karađorđe ordered the Rudnik nahija commanders Milan Obrenović, Lazar Mutap, and Jovan Kursula to go to Osečina where 1,500 infantry and 200 cavalry were to be mustered. Hadži-beg entrenched at Bratačić where an outnumbered Serb force attacked, and finally managed, after reinforcements sent by archpriest Matija Nenadović. Mutap was among the commanders that fought at Bratačić (1 August 1806) and then pursued Hadži-beg into Bosnia. After the Battle of Mišar (13–15 August 1806), bimbaša Cincar-Janko and Mutap pursued Ottoman Bosnian troops across the Sava into Habsburg territory, where Cincar-Janko slew Ostroč-kapetan and Mutap slew Hadži-Mosta at Bosut. At the same time, the Ottoman Bosnian troops that fled to Bosnia via Šabac were ambushed in the Kitog forest by vojvoda Stojan Čupić, vojvoda Miloš Pocerac and archpriest Nikola Smiljanić, losing half of a force and much loot. In a letter compiled in Ostružnica in 1806, he is styled "knez of Dragačevo".

In 1809, Lazar Mutap accompanied Karađorđe in the battles of Sjenica, Nova Varoš, Novi Pazar, Suvodol, Kukutnica, Kolašin, Prijepolje and Nikšić. The Serbian campaign in the southwest (Sandžak or Raška, Lim and Tara rivers) aimed at connecting the rebellion with the Brda, Herzegovina and Montenegrin tribes. At Sjenica in 1809, Mutap and bimbaša Karapavle Simeunović besieged Ottoman Albanian chieftain Ganić and had him and his 30 men burnt alive. Alija Gušanac set out to Kragujevac and pursued Mutap and Tanasko Rajić, but was decisively defeated at Crni Vrh. Mutap took with him the ancestors of the Bojović, Martić, Trninić, Mulić, Božović, Rakićević, Bogdanović and Radošević of Prislonica when he left the Bihor nahiya in 1809.

Anta Bogićević was surrounded at Loznica but was saved after a bloody battle (17–18 October 1810) in which Luka Lazarević, Stojan Čupić, Cincar-Janko, Mutap and many others were wounded. In 1811, Lazar Mutap was promoted to vojvoda in the Rudnik nahija. Other notables promoted in this period were Stojan Čupić, Miloš Pocerac, Petar Moler, Nikola Smiljanić, Cincar-Janko, and his closest comrades from Rudnik, Arsenije Loma and Milić Drinčić, among others. These commanders were given military administration over their areas and were independent from the old generals. Mutap trained the Dragačevo troops at Karanovac.

== Second Uprising ==
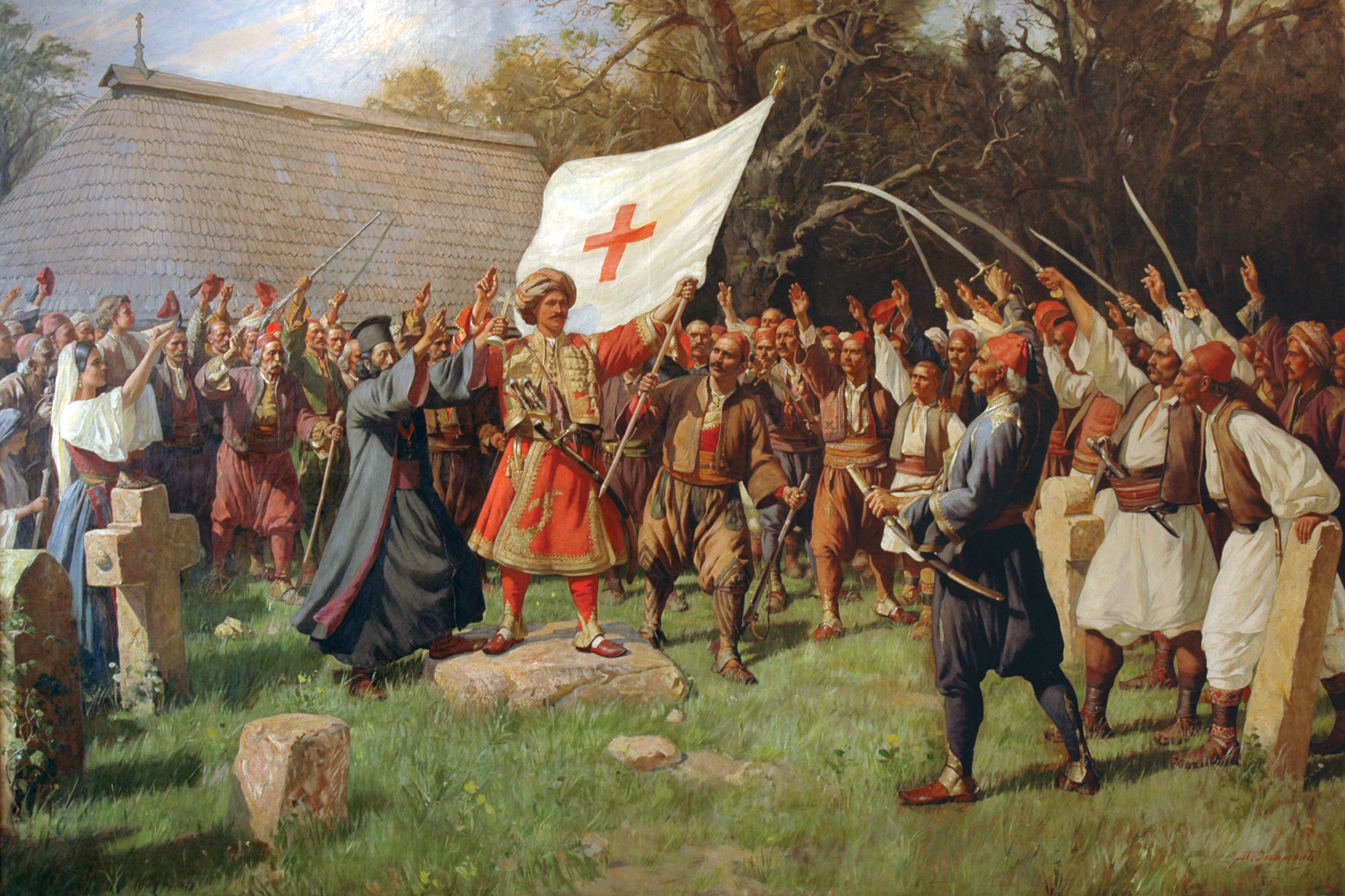
The Takovo Uprising by Paja Jovanović (1889), Takovo Museum.

With the suppression of the uprising in 1813, Mutap declined to flee (as most other commanders) and held out in the Rudnik mountains. He surrendered after hesitating, alongside vojvoda Miloš Obrenović, Loma, Drinčić and others at the Takovo church to delibaşı Ali Agha Serčesma. After the failed Hadži-Prodan's rebellion (September 1814), he was mostly close to Miloš Obrenović. Mutap, Loma and Drinčić chose not to join that rebellion due to Miloš's aid in suppressing it. He participated in the Rudovci meeting with Loma, Drinčić, Nikola Katić, Milutin Garašanin, Toma Vučić and 60 others, discussing a new uprising, and then the Vreoci meeting and Takovo Meeting where the uprising was proclaimed.

With the outbreak of the Second Serbian Uprising, Mutap took Jovan Obrenović, Miloš's younger brother, with him and went cross the Morava into Dragačevo to rise the people and muster an army to attack Čačak. In the meantime, Loma unfortunately died of wounds while taking over Rudnik. The knez of Gruža, Jovan Dobrača, besieged Kragujevac. Mutap left Jovan Obrenović with a number of Rudnik men on the Ljubić hill to set up trenches and then entered Čačak with his force. The Turks were fortified in a trench by the great mosque, at the end of the town, and Mutap decided to surround them at a close distance. Ottoman reinforcements were expected, thus Mutap wanted to assault the trench; when Miloš arrived at Čačak with too small of a force, they decided to wait and collect more troops. They then learnt that Ćaja-paša left Belgrade with a force, so Miloš set out to clash with him. Ćaja-paša destroyed a small force under Milutin Garašanin, while Miloš skirmished with Serčesma and Kara-Mustafa at Rudovci. Miloš together with Dobrača with 500 Gruža men and Drinčić with 200 Crna Gora men now went for Čačak to support Mutap. As Ćaja-paša neared, Mutap's force left the siege and entrenched below Ljubić where Jovan was based. Jovan had left the trench when Mutap left Čačak and Ćaja-paša arrived there; when Miloš, Dobrača and Drinčić arrived at Ljubić the trench was empty. Ćaja-paša entered Čačak on 6 May [O.S. 24 April] 1815.

While retreating from the town ahead of Ćaja-paša, who came with a large army, Mutap was seriously wounded. He was taken wounded on a stretcher to his home village where he died. Another account has him taken first to his village and then to Gornja Trepča where he died. He was said to have been very disappointed in having to leave the siege. His Dragačevo troops went home with the loss of their commander. Miloš was very sad to hear about Mutap. Mutap's remains were buried at the Vujan Monastery, in a tomb on the right side, where also his war flag is kept. After many battles and skirmishes in and around Čačak, it was finally taken by 1 June 1815.

Mutap was described physically as of middle height, with dark hair, red cheeks and bloodshot eyes. He was a great rider and wore a dinjara hat. Irritable by nature, he was generally disliked by his subordinates. He was regarded especially heroic. Together with Loma and Drinčić, K. Nenadović called them "three wise lions". The epic poem Lazar Mutap i Arapin was recorded by philologist Vuk Karadžić from guslar Filip Višnjić.

== See also ==
- Serbian Army (revolutionary)
- List of Serbian Revolutionaries
- Timeline of the Serbian Revolution

== Annotations ==
1. According to K. Nenadović (1884) it was part of the Podgora knežina, later the Morava srez. D. Pavlović (1990) who studied the Rudnik and Požega nahiyas during the revolution listed Prislonica as part of the Rudnička Morava knežina that existed also prior to the uprising.
2. According to M. Milićević (1888), with the outbreak of the uprising, Mutap was one of the 70 men of the Rudnik nahiya collected by Milan Obrenović to accompany Karađorđe.

== Sources ==
- Bojović, Radivoje D. (1974). "Битка на Чачку 1815.године" (PDF). Зборник радова народног музеја. V. Чачак: Народни музеј: 87–112.
- Milićević, Milan Đ. (1888). Поменик знаменитих људи у српског народа новијега доба. Издање Чупићеве задужбине – via Archive.org.
- Mišković, Jovan (1875). "Opis Rudničkog okruga (nastavak)". Glasnik Srpskog učenog društva. XLI: 104–282.
- Nenadović, Konstantin N. (1903) [1883]. Живот и дела великог Ђорђа Петровића Кара-Ђорђа. Vol. I (2 ed.). Belgrade: Штампа Савића и Комп. – via Archive.org.
- Nenadović, Konstantin N. (1884). Живот и дела великог Ђорђа Петровића Кара-Ђорђа. Vol. II (1 ed.). Vienna: У Штампарији Јована Н. Вернаја – via Google Books.
- Pavlović, Dragoljub M. (1990). "Учесници српских үстанака од 1804. до 1815. године из Рудничке и Пожешке нахије" [Participants aux insurrections serbes de 1804 et 1815 nés dans les nahies de Rudnik et de Požega] (PDF). Зборник радова Народног музеја у Чачку. XX: 115–131.
- Pavlović, Sanja (2006). "ДЕМОГРАФСКO-СТАТИСТИЧКА ОБЕЛЕЖЈА ПРИСЛОНИЦЕ" [Demographic-statistical characteristics of Prislonica]. Zbornik radova-Geografski fakultet Univerziteta u Beogradu. 54: 81–96.
- Protić, Kosta (1893). "Ратни догађаји из првога српског устанка под Карађорђем Петровићем 1804—1813". Годишњица Николе Чупића. XIII. Državna štamparija.
- Šćekić, Radenko; Leković, Žarko; Premović, Marijan (2015). "Political Developments and Unrests in Stara Raška (Old Rascia) and Old Herzegovina during Ottoman Rule". Balcanica. 46 (46): 79–106. doi:10.2298/BALC1546079S.
