= Siege of Užice (1805) =

Battle part of the first Serbian uprising

- Part of the First Serbian Uprising
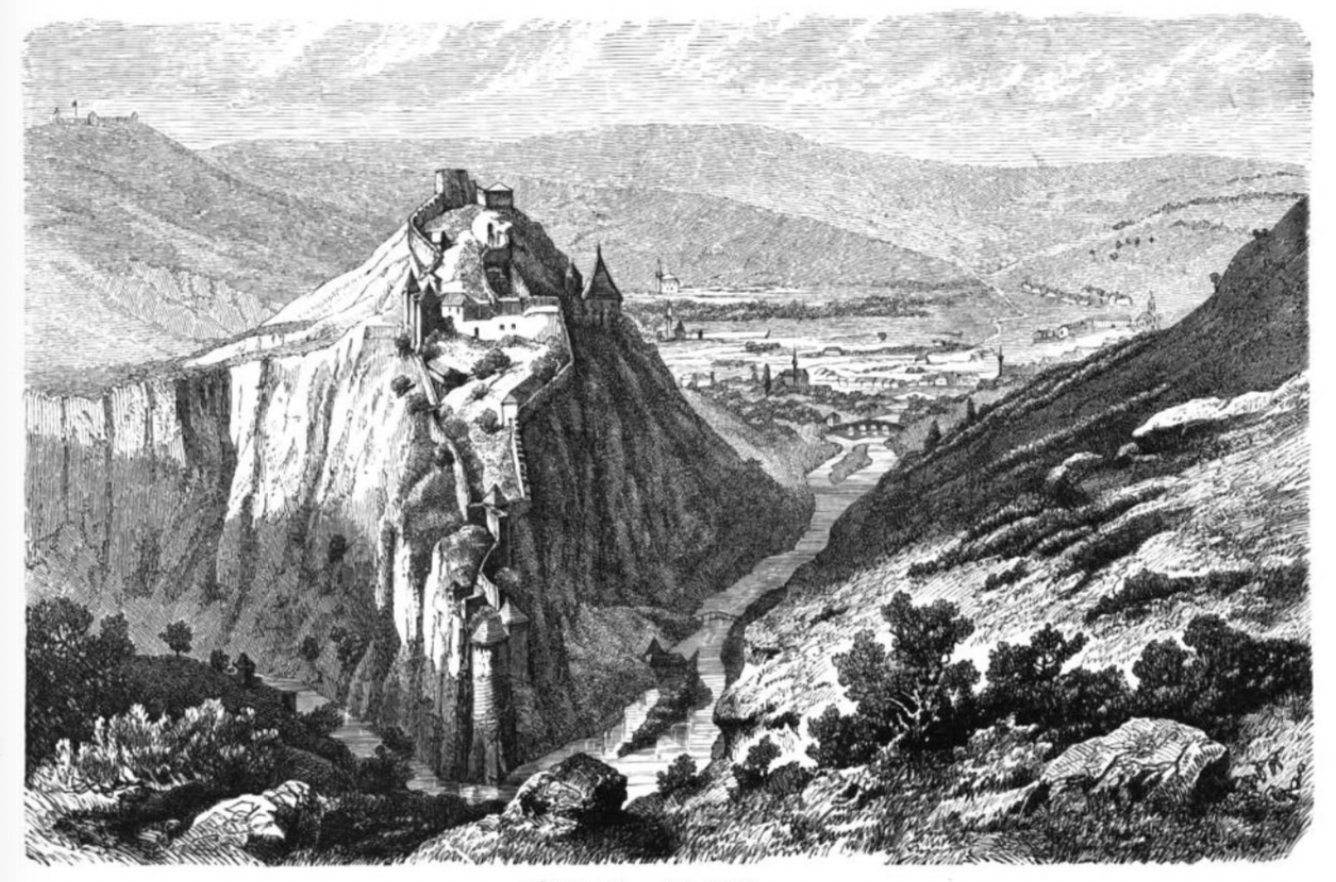
- View of the Old Fortress, the town of Užice and the Đetinja river in 1860
Date	31 July – 1 August 1805
Location	Užice, Sanjak of Smederevo, Ottoman Empire (today Serbia)
Result	Serbian victory, truce
Territorial changes	Užice acknowledged as imperial possession

Belligerents
Revolutionary Serbia	Dahije; Sanjak of Zvornik

Commanders and leaders
Jakov Nenadović; Milan Obrenović	Omer-aga Nišlija (surrendered); Bego Novljanin (surrendered); Osman-aga Fočić (surrendered)

Units involved
Valjevo nahija Soko nahija Rudnik nahija	Janissaries; Bosnian deli locals

Casualties and losses
8 dead, 20 wounded	300 dead and wounded

The siege of Užice was undertaken by the Serbian rebel army led by Jakov Nenadović and Milan Obrenović against the city of Užice, in the hands of the Dahije (renegade Janissaries) supported by the Sanjak of Zvornik. Užice was an important city in the province, laying in the west of rebel territory and serving as a reinforcement point of the Dahije and their allies. Heavily bombarded, with most of the houses set on fire, the city quickly surrendered but remained in Ottoman hands as part of a truce.

== Background ==
Užice, the second largest city of the Sanjak of Smederevo ("Belgrade Pashalik"), was made up of a town (varoš) and a fortress (grad) overlooking the town. The town had over 3,000 households, with a "Turk" (Muslim) majority and small Serb minority. The Dahije (renegade Janissaries) had wrested the Pashalik in 1801 and put their followers in the administration, including at Užice. The Dahije stronghold at Užice was in the plans of supreme commander Karađorđe, who ordered a larger army to take it. The Muslims in Užice, the majority of the citizens, were militarily able and fit to defend the town and fort. Užice and Nova Varoš were raided on 5 June 1805 by rebels, which the Republic of Ragusa connected with Karađorđe's intention to open the road to Montenegro. A couple of weeks later the Pasha of Travnik threatened the Metropolitan of Herzegovina regarding relations with rebels. The Russian consul Stevan Sankovski deterred Montenegro and Herzegovina from rising up. Užice corresponded with Bosnia, with most found documents identifying Memiš-aga Mačković of Višegrad as a contact. In an Ottoman document dated 4 July it was said that "since some time the Serb rayah has risen up, and now rushed on the city of Užice". At the Sarajevo sharia court, many plans for the attack on Serbia and deblockade of Užice were made.

During the battle of Karanovac (29 June–1 July), the Valjevo nahija troops of Jakov Nenadović and Rudnik nahija troops Milan Obrenović were divided into smaller detachments that positioned themselves at the frontiers of the Valjevo, Užice and Rudnik areas, stopping reinforcements from Užice to the encircled Karanovac. One night, Užice soldiers attacked a Serb camp near Užice while these slept, killing 150 and dispersing that detachment, then proceeded to enter surrounding villages, burn down houses and kill 309 people. Karađorđe used these losses around Užice as a reminder to the rebels to take one's duty seriously and always be ready. When Karanovac fell into Serbian hands there was no longer a need for sentries towards Užice, and Jakov had informed Karađorđe in May 1805 that there was no fear of Ottoman Bosnian troops and that the Drina could be secured with a hundred soldiers. Karađorđe recommended Jakov to take Soko and Užice and to rise up all of the Soko, Užice and Zvornik nahiyas. Jakov called archimandrite Melentije Stevanović, who had risen and armed part of the Soko nahiya, Milan Obrenović with the Rudnik nahija army, and captain Radič Petrović to aid him in the capture of Užice, to begin with. At the end of July, Ottoman Bosnian troops from Zvornik failed in a general attack on the rebels. Some 2,000 troops of the Zvornik group were stationed towards Užice. Užice was the refuge of Bego Novljanin and deli from Bosnia, refugees from Karanovac, and Omer-aga Nišlija with Janissaries from the Sanjak of Vidin. The rebel delegation estimated 4,500 soldiers at Užice during talks with Russian Interior Minister Adam Jerzy Czartoryski in late 1804.

== History ==
The large army under the command of Jakov gathered outside Valjevo and went for Užice, where the citizens learnt of their movements. Užice sent 30 of their yerli (respected native Muslims) that met with Jakov in the Crnokosa mountain to deter him from attacking "the imperial city and sons". Jakov replied that he had no intention in attacking the Ottoman Empire nor its subjects, but was to destroy the renegade Dahije and their followers, and if Užice wished to live in peace it would need to surrender them and he would leave with his army. The yerli, although without any mandate in the negotiation, still said that they wouldn't give up their fellow Muslims to Christians as it was against their religion. Jakov bid them farewell, saying "return to where you came from and tell Omer and Bego and all Užice Turks what you heard and saw here, and I with the army will be behind you".

After the yerli left, Jakov hurried for Užice and set up siege points around the city. The buljubaša (captain) Milić Kedić and archimandrite Melentije Stevanović camped with Soko Serbs on the western side of Ponikve, Jakov Nenadović on the north on Tatinac and Krčagovo to Kruščica, Milan and Miloš Obrenović on the eastern side by the Đetinja river, and archpriest Milutin Ilić in the south on the Zabučje hill. Two cannons were set up on Kruščica, operated by archpriest Matija Nenadović, which also used incendiary ammunition. These cannons had been used at Karanovac. Jakov had cannons on Tatinac as well. Kedić reported to Jakov.

The Užice Turks surrounded the city with ambuscades and earth- and stone barriers armed with muskets. The Serb citizens, as well as villagers from the surroundings, were imprisoned by the Turks in some buildings as to not risk them aiding the Serb attack.

Shortly after their arrival around Užice, on 31 July [O.S. 19 July] 1805 the rebels bombarded the city with cannon fire followed by fusillade engulfing the city with fire. The first cannon fire was from Tatinac. Local native Serbs informed Jakov of Austrian artillery points during the Austro-Turkish War (1788–1791), thus he moved the cannons to the Krčagovo field. The next day, 1 August [O.S. 20 July] 1805, the bombardment was helped by strong winds and most of the town was caught on fire, including the minaret of the mosque in the center of the city. The rebels successively closed in and set many Turk houses on fire. That day was the Orthodox feast day of St. Elijah. After seeing the fire over the town, the Turk sentry post towards Zabučje was left and the soldiers took to the Užice fortress, upon which Milutin Ilić took over their post. The Turks began to leave other points in the city for the fortress. They believed they could defend themselves there, when the Serbs overtook the town. Women and children screamed that it was better to surrender to the Serbs than to burn alive. Apart from Jakov, Milan, Miloš, Ilić and Kedić, who commanded the siege bases in the prelude, also Luka Lazarević, Arsenije Loma, Lazar Mutap, Radič Petrović, Milovan Grbović, Mijailo Radović, Cincar-Janko and Petar Moler participated in the siege. A rebel detachment found and freed the imprisoned Serb citizens, numbering up to 400 in the town's main inn (han). Almost all Turk houses were burning by the time the rebels closed in on the fortress; according to K. Nenadović, some 5,000 buildings were burnt. Many Turk elderly and exhausted women and children were found by the fortress walls, as there was no more room in the fortress.

At around 16:00 (4 p.m.) the Turks signaled for negotiation about surrender, and the rebels thus stopped all gunfire in and around Užice. By the end of fighting the Serbs counted one dead captain, seven momci (commander's guard), and 20 wounded, while the Turks had 300 killed and wounded soldiers. K. Nenadović claimed 300 dead enemies. 20 yerli elders met up with the Serbs with a peace proposal, ensuring them that all would be forgotten for a peaceful state. The two sides agreed on peace based on the following:

- The Užice Turks banish Omer-aga Nišlija, Bego Novljanin, Osman-aga Fočić and all their Janissaries and Turk immigrants, and all followers of these.
- The Užice Turks remain in the fortress and even the city itself on their own property, but are prohibited from going among Serbs.
- The Muslim judicial court only deals with the Užice Turks and never interferes in Serb disputes.
- The Serbs have their own local independent government and courts.
- The Turks pay 50,000 groschen in reparations and give the Serb leaders 80 of their noble horses (hatovi).

When surrendering Užice, Jakov was serenaded by the city musicians as a gift from Ali-paša Vidajić, the bey from the Sanjak of Zvornik. Osman-aga Fočić gave his white Arabian horse with rich equipment to archpriest Matija Nenadović, as compensation for the horse he took from Aleksa Nenadović when Mehmed-aga Fočić had Aleksa executed during the "Slaughter of the Knezes". At first, Matija received another, very fine noble horse, but demanded "that horse which Osman-aga Fočić rode into Užice with", despite many telling him that the other horse was better. Matija reportedly threatened that he would muster an army and attack the fort himself, and kill Osman-aga Fočić if he wouldn't comply; Matija received his horse and thereby also affected his honour and humiliated him. Bego Novljanin gave his Arabian horse with rich equipment to priest Luka Lazarević as compensation for the murder of Luka's brother Ranko in Šabac in 1801. Twenty of their best horses with full equipment were divided between the commanders. Those momci who had lost their horse received new ones. The personal weapons and horse were held in great honour among both Serbs and Turks.

On 3 August [O.S. 22 July] 1805 Omer-aga Nišlija, Bego Novljanin, Osman-aga Fočić and their followers were escorted across the Drina into Bosnia. Užice was acknowledged as an imperial possession, despite being conquered by Serbs, and was left in the hands of Turks in the same way as the forts of Šabac and Smederevo. The "imperial Turks" were thus left in peace in the city.

The rebels appointed Aleksa Popović from Subjel the starešina (chief) of Užice and its surroundings. Jakov put locals under the command of Aleksa to defend the area and people. Due to distinction in the battle, Mijailo Radović was appointed the knez of Zlatibor.

== Aftermath and legacy ==
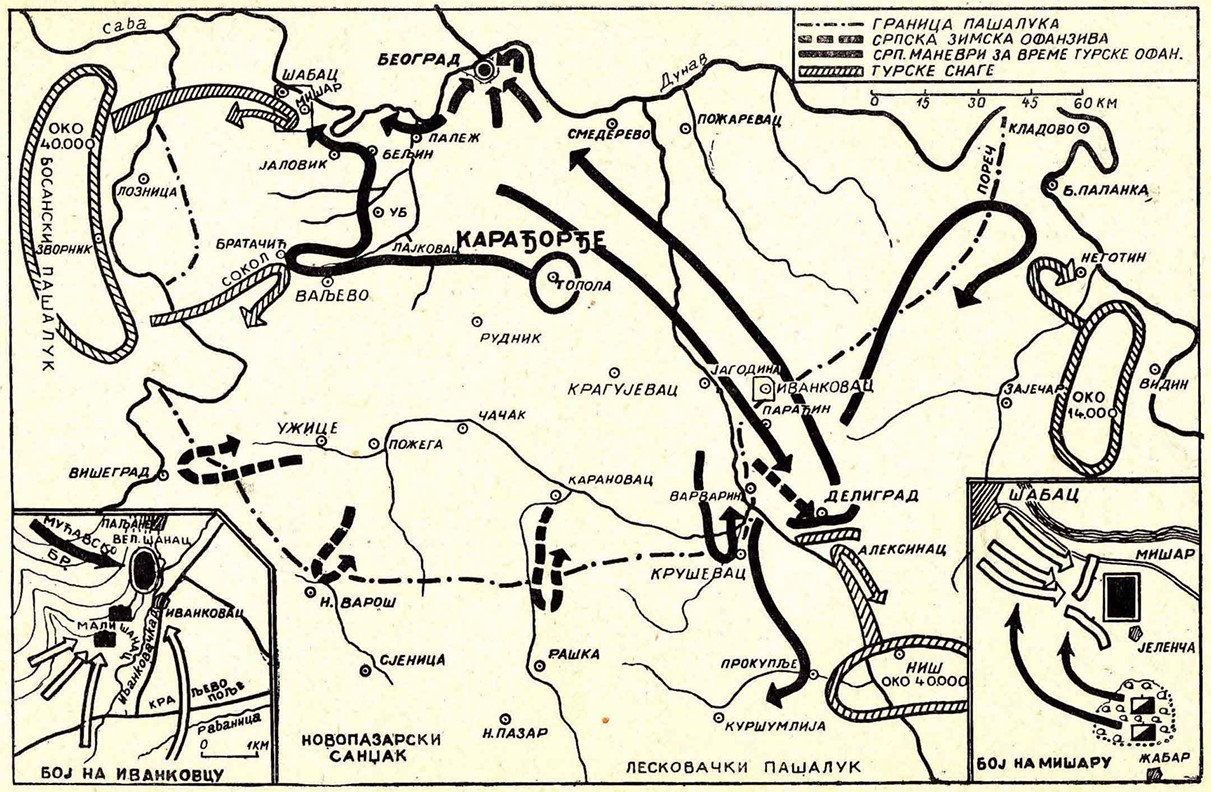
Map of operations in 1805.

After the siege, the main rebel army changed the front to the other side of the territory. Jakov and Melentije went to the Soko nahiya, where the latter was proclaimed the starešina (chief). Kedić was left with a detachment near Soko. Jakov's army then moved to the Drina river banks. False news arrived at Sarajevo that the rebel army planned to take Novi Pazar and that among the 80,000 Serbians were Austrian baron Pavle Davidović and 3,000 Austrian soldiers. The sultan ordered the Viziers of Bosnia in 1805 to muster armies to attack Serbia, and they crossed the Drina and attacked Valjevo and Šabac in late January 1806. The Užice Turks later broke the truce by killing many Serbs in the surrounding villages, after hearing of the Ottoman imperial army setting out for Serbia. They counted on potential reinforcements from Bosnia. After securing the eastern front, Karađorđe ordered for the takeover of Užice in 1807, part of the mission to expand the rebellion into Bosnia, Old Serbia and Herzegovina.

The epic poem Uzimanje Užica ("Taking of Užice") was collected by philologist Vuk Karadžić from guslar Filip Višnjić. Sima Milutinović Sarajlija (1791–1847) wrote an epic poem about the siege included in his collection Srbijanka (1826), titled Prvi pohod na Užice.

== See also ==
- Timeline of the Serbian Revolution
- Siege of Užice (1738)

== Sources ==
- Batalaka, Lazar Arsenijević (1898). Историја српског устанка. Vol. I. Izd. Batalakinoga fonda.
- Ðorđević, Tihomir R. (1930). "коњ и оружје". Наш народни живот (PDF). Vol. 1. Издавачка књижарница Геце Кона.
- Hrabak, Bogumil (1996). "Ваљевци у почетним годинама првог српског устанка". Гласник Историјског архива Ваљево. 30. Istorijski arhiv Valjevo.
- Hrabak, Bogumil (1995). "Српски устаници и Новопазарски санџак (Рашка)". Историјски часопис. 40–41. Istorijski institut.
- Ignjić, Stevan (1961). Ужичка нахија. Изд. "Туристичке штампе".
- Kuzović, Duško R. (2015). "Урбанистички развој Ужица у XVIII и првој половини XIX века". Зборник радова Филозофског факултета. XLV (4).
- Milićević, Milan Đ. (1888). Поменик знаменитих људи у српског народа новијега доба. Издање Чупићеве задужбине – via Archive.org.
- Milutinović, Dragutin (1895). "Iz Srbijanke Sime Milutinovića: Prvi pohod na Užice". Godišnjica Nikole Čupića. XV. Državna Štamparija: 211.
- Nenadović, Konstantin N. (1903) [1883]. Живот и дела великог Ђорђа Петровића Кара-Ђорђа. Vol. I (2 ed.). Belgrade: Штампа Савића и Комп. – via Archive.org.
- Nenadović, Konstantin N. (1884). Живот и дела великог Ђорђа Петровића Кара-Ђорђа. Vol. II (1 ed.). Vienna: У Штампарији Јована Н. Вернаја – via Google Books.
- Protić, Kosta (1893). "Ратни догађаји из првога српског устанка под Карађорђем Петровићем 1804—1813". Годишњица Николе Чупића. XIII. Državna štamparija.
- Teinović, Bratislav (2020). "Преглед српско-турског ратовања на Дрини (1804-1815)". Vojnoistorijski glasnik. 2: 9–35.
