= Milutin Ilić =

Serbian commander

- Born: 1739; Guča, Sanjak of Smederevo, Ottoman Empire
- Died: 1814 (aged 74–75); Ovčar-Kablar, Ottoman Empire
- Burial place: Holy Trinity Monastery, Ovčar-Kablar
- Children: Đoka Protić
- Military career
- Allegiance: Revolutionary Serbia
- Service years: 1804–1813
- Rank: vojvoda
- Nickname: Prota Gučanin
- Unit: Dragačevo
- Commands: Čačak area
- Known for: archpriest, commander in Čačak

Milutin Ilić (Serbian: Милутин Илић; 1739–1814), known by the demonym Gučanin (Гучанин), was a Serbian archpriest and commander in the First Serbian Uprising (1804–13).

== Early life ==
Ilić was born in the village of Guča, in the Čačak nahiya. The village was part of the Dragačevo knežina (Christian self-governing villages). His paternal family, the Radešić, hailed from Herzegovina. An ancestor called Đuđa was the village knez of Guča, and was killed in a Turk attack on the village in which many in his family were killed or taken slaves. Only two boys survived, Đerman and Đerasim; Milutin was the grandson of Đerasim through Ilija (hence the patronymic Ilić).

Ilić became the Orthodox archpriest in the Dragačevo parish and was seated in Guča. He was respected among the people.

== Uprising ==
With the outbreak of the uprising, Ilić rose up Dragačevo, and in the beginning of operations served under the command of general Milan Obrenović, and governed Dragačevo independently. In his ten years of military activity, he was mostly under the command and supporting supreme commander Karađorđe's operations, and participated in many larger battles and lesser skirmishes, especially in the Užice and Čačak nahiyas.

In 1805, he and the Dragačevo unit supported supreme commander Karađorđe at Karanovac (29 June–1 July). After the battle, he was promoted to vojvoda (general) of Dragačevo by Karađorđe. He participated in the siege of Užice (1 August [O.S. 20 July] 1805), a Dahije stronghold, alongside Radič Petrović, Lazar Mutap, the Obrenović brothers Milan and Miloš, Luka Lazarević, Jakov Nenadović, Milovan Grbović, Cincar-Janko and Petar Moler. He was eventually made the starešina (chief) of all of the Čačak nahija. He had under him lesser commanders Milić Radović from Kaone, Novak Bošković from Goračić, Ilija from Samajla, and his son Đoka Protić.

In 1806, on the feast day of the Holy Trinity, Ilić intercepted the Janissary Ord-Aga from Sarajevo in the Lopate village in Dragačevo and managed to kill him and then cut off his head as a trophy; this event was made into an epic poem titled Boj na Lopatu. He then fought at Ponikve against Đul-Beg and Mehmed-Beg, decimated their 1,500 troops by half.

In 1807 he supported Karađorđe at Užice, with the town being surrendered on 10 July [O.S. 28 June] 1807.

On 11 January 1811, Ilić received the vojvoda (general) diploma and the governorship of the villages of Guča, Rogača, Osok, Markovica, Kojić, Tijanje, Turica, Iritari, Dučelovići, Tučkovo, Dren, Čučanik, Negrišori, Lisica, Puovo, Pilatović, Kapica, Požega, Bakionica, Prijanović, Lopat, Kravarica Donja, Kravarica Gornja, Virovo, Cerovo, Trešnjevica, Mirosaljci. With Novak Bošković and Milić Radović he was to appoint two or three kmet (serfs) to become judges in the magistrate at Karanovac, educated by the Serbian Governing Council, and also set up four postage offices. His son Đoka Protić was also appointed vojvoda in Dragačevo as Ilić was old.

With the Ottoman suppression of the uprising in 1813, Ilić and his son stayed in monasteries and woods and did not flee to the Habsburg monarchy as the majority of rebel leaders did. He died on 14 January 1814 at the Monastery of the Holy Trinity in the Ovčar-Kablar gorge where he was buried. His son was killed while kidnapped by Ottoman troops during the Second Serbian Uprising.

== See also ==
- Serbian Army (revolutionary)
- List of Serbian Revolutionaries
- Timeline of the Serbian Revolution

== Sources ==
- Batalaka, Lazar Arsenijević (1898). Историја српског устанка. Vol. I. Izd. Batalakinoga fonda. pp. 88, 197, 216.
- Milićević, Milan Đ. (1888). Поменик знаменитих људи у српског народа новијега доба. Издање Чупићеве задужбине. pp. 115–118 – via Archive.org.
- Nenadović, Konstantin N. (1884). Живот и дела великог Ђорђа Петровића Кара-Ђорђа. Vol. II (1 ed.). Vienna: У Штампарији Јована Н. Вернаја. pp. 690–694 – via Google Books.
- Pavlović, Dragoljub M. (1990). "Учесници српских үстанака од 1804. до 1815. године из Рудничке и Пожешке нахије" [Participants aux insurrections serbes de 1804 et 1815 nés dans les nahies de Rudnik et de Požega] (PDF). Зборник радова Народног музеја у Чачку. XX: 115–131.
- Protić, Kosta (1893). "Ратни догађаји из првога српског устанка под Карађорђем Петровићем 1804—1813". Годишњица Николе Чупића. XIII. Državna štamparija.
- Protić, Milisav (1940). Драгачево и његови славни синови. Ниш: "Св. Цар Константин".
