= Dublje =

Dublje can refer to:

- Dublje (Bogatić), a village in Serbia
- Dublje (Svilajnac), a village in Serbia
- Dublje (Trstenik), a village in Serbia
