= Battle of Rudnik (1804) =

Battle part of the first Serbian uprising

- Part of the First Serbian Uprising
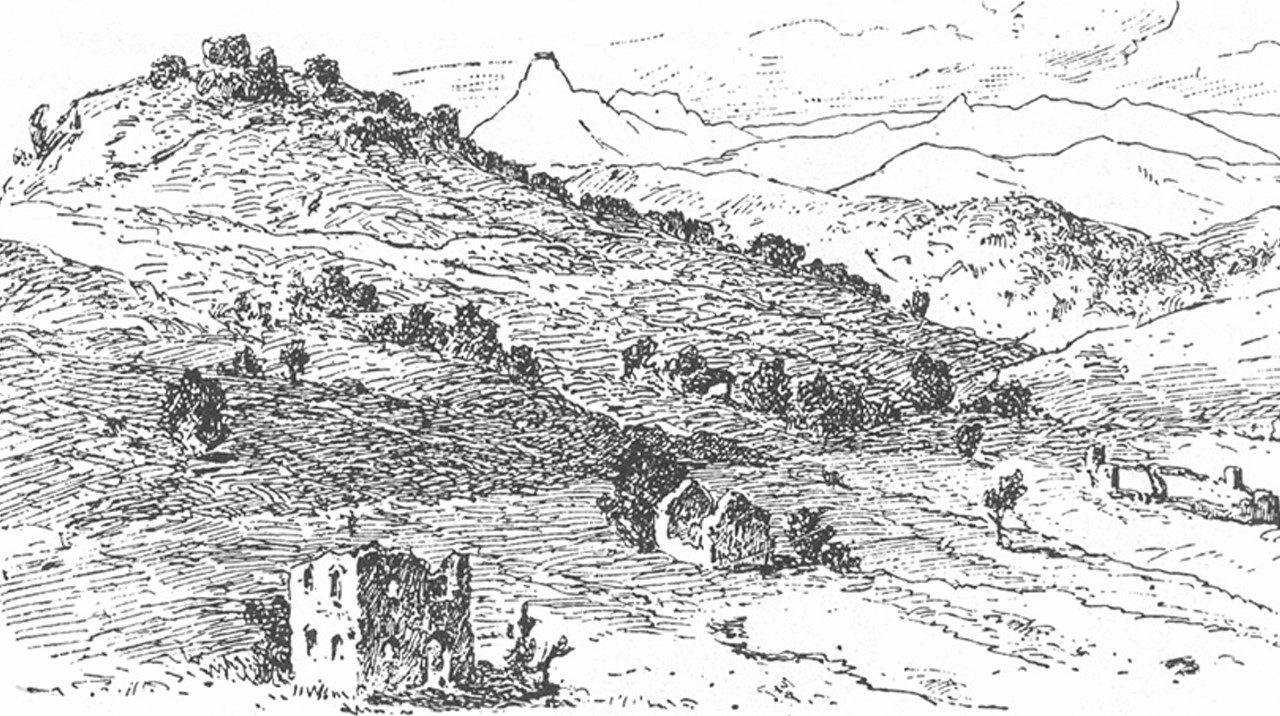
- Ruins at Rudnik, drawing by Felix Kanitz (1829–1904)
| Date | 4–6 March 1804 |
| Location | Rudnik, Sanjak of Smederevo, Ottoman Empire (today Serbia) |
| Result | Serbian victory |
| Territorial changes | Rudnik in rebel hands |

Belligerents
| Serbian rebels | Dahije (Ottoman Empire) Ottoman city garrison |

Commanders and leaders
| Karađorđe; Milan Obrenović | Sali-aga; Alil Džavić †; Pljakić †; Čolak-Alija |

Units involved
| Šumadija army Rudnik nahija army | Janissaries; Rudnik deli and local soldiers Čačak soldiers |

Casualties and losses
| Little | 300+ |

The Battle of Rudnik was undertaken by the Serbian rebel army led by Karađorđe against the town of Rudnik, in the hands of the Dahije (renegade Janissaries) in early March 1804. Rudnik was the centre of the Rudnik nahija in the main rebel territory of Šumadija. It was in the hands of Sali-aga, a notorious Janissary. After failed negotiations and skirmishes, the two sides agreed that the Dahije leave the town. They were pursued and defeated; however, Sali-aga managed to escape to Čačak. The Muslim population left the town of their own will.

== Background ==
The Dahije (renegade Janissaries) had wrested the Belgrade Pashalik in 1801 and ruled it with terror. They put their followers in the administration, including at Rudnik. Rudnik was located on the slopes of the Rudnik mountain, with the Jasenica river crossed by the fortress and town, located to the left of it. The ruler of Rudnik (titled mutesellim or muselim and being the commander of all Rudnik nahiya) was Sali-aga, the brother of Dahije leader Kučuk-Alija, and he was known for his evilness and oppression of Serbs and especially women; families were torn apart due to his transgressions, due to which he was called "the Rudnik bull". Rudnik had a square defensive stone fortress with round towers below the Veliki and Mali Šturac. It was surrounded by a deep and wide trench with palisades. Outside the fortress was a town with mostly "Turk" (Muslim) yerli ("natives", sr. jerlije), with a small number of Serb households. Austrian spy Paul von Mitesser counted 100 Muslim and 18 Serb households in his 1784 report. The town had many yerli and sipahi cavalry, as well as many immigrant Janissaries. With the outbreak of rebellion, mutesellim Alil-aga Džavić with his Janissaries from Užice, and "Pljaka" Pljakić with his Janissaries from Karanovac, came to the town. Tokatlić-aga or "Beg Tokatlić", was the leader of the Rudnik natives, nominally loyal to the sultan.

Serbs were well-aware of Sali-aga's behaviour and the fact that he murdered Gavrilo Buđevac during the "Slaughter of the Knezes". After dealing with the Dahije at Sibnica-Drlupa, supreme commander Karađorđe sent Petar Kara and Arsenije Loma with a detachment to the surroundings of Rudnik, with the task of stopping the Rudnik Turks from going into Serb villages and doing evil. They protected the roads and Turk incursions into the villages of Šumadija with around 100 men. Petar Kara, holding an ambuscade on the Rudnik road, messaged Karađorđe, who gathered troops around Vrbica in the Kragujevac nahiya, that Džavić had 200 cavalry. Karađorđe sent Janićije Ðurić with twenty horsemen to Petar Kara to increase morale and improve ambuscades in the area. After this, Petar Kara and Janićije met with Karađorđe at Topola, who told them to fight to the death in the Rudnik nahiya, and that after the resting of his own troops, he would accompany them in taking over the town. They were then sent back to the Rudnik ambuscades. Karađorđe was informed by Milan Obrenović, Petar Kara, Lazar Mutap and Arsenije Loma, who set up ambuscades around Rudnik, that the Dahije leader Sali-aga received reinforcements of 500 Turk cavalry from various places and that this posed a problem. As more troops gathered around Karađorđe, he set out for Rudnik to liberate the area from the Dahije, moving from Palanka via Saranovo and Čumić.

== History ==
Karađorđe arrived with his cavalry outside Rudnik on the night of 1 March [O.S. 18 February] 1804, seeing that Rudnik had worked on its trench. He gathered above Rudnik on 2 March [O.S. 19 February] 1804 with Janko Katić, Stanoje Glavaš, Vule Kolarac, Sava Trnavac, Janko Račanin, hajduk Milovan from Plana, and also Milan Obrenović who arrived with 80 armed Rudnik nahiya men. Among Milan's men were Milić Drinčić, Arsenije Loma, Lazar Mutap, and others. During the rebel gathering outside Rudnik, the commander Čolak-Alija of Čačak came with a larger unit to help Rudnik, but they were defeated and pushed back to Čačak.

Upon his arrival, Karađorđe demanded that the town Turks meet with him the next day, and they complied, sensing the seriousness in having him there in person. Tokatlić-aga, a respected native, came with two others as the main representative and began talks with Karađorđe, being well received. Karađorđe told them that the town had put itself in trouble by supporting the Dahije, and asked that the natives discuss and agree that Sali-aga, Alil Džavić and Pljakić, and all their followers, be expelled and escorted to wherever they wanted to go. He ensured them that only in this case would he let the town remain in peace, and continue living just as before. They acknowledged the bad situation, and upon their return to the town asked the Dahije trio with all their men to return home. The trio sent a message that they and the town yerli (respected native Muslims) would sit down with Karađorđe to discuss the conditions of their free way out. Karađorđe messaged the meeting place and planned for the assassination of the trio, but sensing deceit, they sent only Alil Džavić and Tokatlić with four yerli. He was most eager to kill Sali-aga, and thought that dealing with the trio first would ease the fight with the rest at Rudnik. Karađorđe stopped his plans, as only one of them was present, and again ensured, as before, that he would let the town in peace if the Dahije left, but stressed that the guilt would fall on them if they declined and he attacked the town.

Džavić and Tokatlić returned to the town and it was agreed that the Dahije leave the town the next day in the morning, on either 3 March [O.S. 20 February] 1804 (as per K. Protić) or 5 March [O.S. 22 February] 1804 (as per Batalaka). The morning came, but the Dahije did not leave, as they had just received news that Kučuk-Alija, Sali-aga's brother and one of the four leading Dahije, left Belgrade with a Janissary army to fight the Serbs. Rudnik demanded a 7-days-term for their exit, and now moved all property in the town into the fortress. Hearing of all this, Karađorđe ordered for the attack on Rudnik simultaneously from all sides, with the operation plan:

- One detachment attacking from Jasenica, commanded by Karađorđe.
- One detachment attacking from the side of Katren.
- One detachment attacking from the Rudnik mountains, along the Jasenica.
- One detachment attacking from Zvezda.

The town saw the rebel army readying and decided to sortie, but they failed and were pursued back into town, where they lost 50 or 86 soldiers and 10 houses were burnt down, and the rest of the troops retreated into the fortress. Loma had ordered his men to shoot ten bullets each at the fortress, as to give the impression that the "Serb army was plenty, as leaves in the mountain". Fearing for worse, together with the food shortage, and seeing that Kučuk-Alija wouldn't be able to break through for their defense, they decided for continuing negotiations.

According to K. Protić, Rudnik sent Tokatlić with some yerli once again, who offered the Serbs the town and fortress, and that those Turks that wished to stay be left to stay, and the rest move to Užice, safely escorted by the Serbs, while according to Batalaka they agreed on the Dahije and their followers leaving, and also suggested that Karađorđe choose some among the yerli to escort them. As Kučuk-Alija could arrive at any time, leading to inconvenience and harder work, Karađorđe accepted. As the uprising had shown, agreements and one's word meant nothing.

Karađorđe sent a strong unit (numbering 300 selected men according to Batalaka) ahead on the road to Užice to wait in ambush. When the Turks exited the town on 6 March [O.S. 21 February] 1804 they saw where the roads to Užice and Karanovac diverge the fresh tracks, multitude of hoof prints in the mud, and sensing an ambush they turned and went for Majdan and the road leading to Karanovac and Čačak. Either Karađorđe, who watched their exit carefully and then rushed and flanked, or the rebels at the ambuscades at the Užice road learnt of this and rushed to attack them, hoping they would clash somewhere in the gorges. The Turks had advanced and the rebels reached the rear parts of the column by the Čačak road at Jelen-kamen. In the fierce attack, 200 Turks were killed, including Džavić and Pljakić, the former slain by Jovan Riznić from Banja, and the latter slain by Antonije Ristić. Sali-aga managed to escape to Čačak with the rest. 40–50 yerli families remained in Rudnik, and Karađorđe ordered that they be let to live in peace, as other Serbian citizens.

The Serbian rebels gained much booty: good horses, attire, weapons, and most importantly, gunpowder and lead, which was in shortage. Karađorđe entered the town and set Sali-aga's konak (mansion) on fire and razed it, then filled the trench. He met with the yerli and guaranteed that they would continue to live in peace. The Muslims received full rights, and he told them that if they lived in peace with the Serbs, "not a hair from their head nor property would be missing". To the Serbs in Rudnik and surroundings, he told them to keep distance and respect the Muslims.

Karađorđe promoted Milan Obrenović to starešina (chief, governor) of the Rudnik nahija and told him that he would pay with his life if the Rudnik Turks, if still peaceful, would be troubled. Due to the distinction of the Rudnik leaders, Mutap was proclaimed starešina (chief) and buljubaša (captain) of Rudnička Morava, Loma was proclaimed buljubaša of the Kačer knežina, and Drinčić was proclaimed buljubaša of the Crna Gora–Podgora knežina by Karađorđe. Janko Katić was proclaimed the knez of Turija (Kosmaj) and vojvoda (general). According to K. Protić the promotion was made on 5 March [O.S. 22 February] 1804, and Karađorđe left the area some days prior to 11 March [O.S. 28 February] 1804, when the rebels burnt down the remaining of Sali-aga's mansions and properties in the area.

== Aftermath and legacy ==
Sali-aga managed to Čačak with 200–300 men. The Rudnik Turks did not wish to stay and eventually left the town and fortress for Užice. Brusnica, instead of Rudnik, became the Rudnik nahija capital under Milan Obrenović, due to it being his home village. Due to the kill of Pljakić, Antonije Ristić received the nickname Pljaka and Pljakić by the rebels. In 1806, the Rudnik mines were operated by the rebels.

The Valjevo nahiya troops under Nikola Grbović and archpriest Matija Nenadović took Valjevo, while Jakov Nenadović destroyed a Turk detachment at Svileuva, at the same time as the taking of Rudnik. The Rudnik army which participated in the battle under Arsenije Loma, Milić Drinčić and Lazar Mutap were sent to rest and then to gather at Vrbica. Milan Obrenović was sent to further arm the Rudnik nahija and then to also gather at Vrbica. Karađorđe's troops rested at Stragari and had three-days leave and then went to Vrbica where they awaited the others, and were then to take Jagodina.

== See also ==
- Timeline of the Serbian Revolution

== Annotations ==
1. It is known in historiography as the "attack on Rudnik" (Serbian: напад на Рудник/napad na Rudnik), "taking of Rudnik" (заузеће Рудника), "siege of Rudnik" (opsada Rudnika).
2. Batalaka dated the arrival of Karađorđe to 1 March [O.S. 18 February] 1804, the first agreement on the Dahije's exit for 5 March [O.S. 22 February] 1804. K. Protić dated the first agreement on the Dahije's exit for 3 March [O.S. 20 February] 1804, promotion to 5 March [O.S. 22 February] 1804. S. Novaković concluded that the fighting took place 4–6 March, using all available sources.

== Sources ==
- Batalaka, Lazar Arsenijević (1898). Историја српског устанка. Vol. I. Izd. Batalakinoga fonda.
- Milićević, Milan Đ. (1888). Поменик знаменитих људи у српског народа новијега доба. Издање Чупићеве задужбине – via Archive.org.
- Nenadović, Konstantin N. (1903) [1883]. Живот и дела великог Ђорђа Петровића Кара-Ђорђа. Vol. I (2 ed.). Belgrade: Штампа Савића и Комп. – via Archive.org.
- Nenadović, Konstantin N. (1884). Живот и дела великог Ђорђа Петровића Кара-Ђорђа. Vol. II (1 ed.). Vienna: У Штампарији Јована Н. Вернаја – via Google Books.
- Novaković, Stojan (1904). Устанак на дахије 1804. Штампано у Државној штампарији – via Archive.org.
- Protić, Kosta (1893). "Ратни догађаји из првога српског устанка под Карађорђем Петровићем 1804—1813". Годишњица Николе Чупића. XIII. Državna štamparija.
- Zlatković, Branko R. (2021). "Казивања о устаничким ослобађањима утврђеног града Рудника" (PDF). Савремена српска фолклористика: зборник радова са Међународног научног скупа одржаног од 2. до 4. октобра 2020. у Тршићу: 67–88.
