= Gornja Trepča =

Gornja Trepča may refer to:

- Gornja Trepča, Serbia, a village near Čačak
- Gornja Trepča, Nikšić, a village in Nikšić Municipality, Montenegro
