= Jovan Kursula =

Serbian commander (1768–1813)

Portrait of Kursula

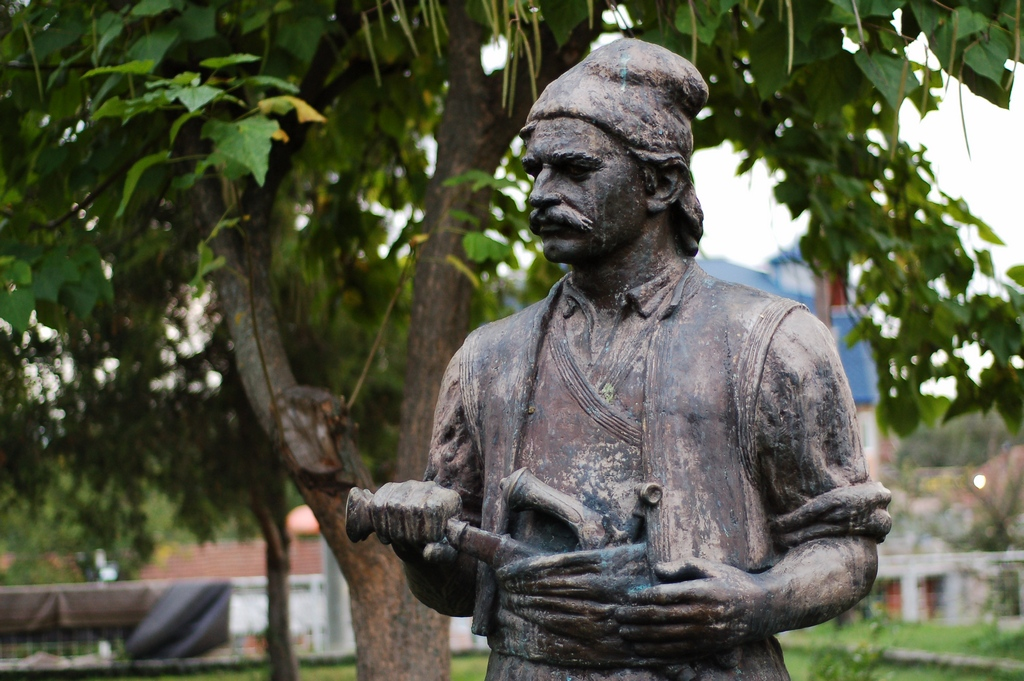
Statue in Varvarin.

Jovan Petrović (Serbian Cyrillic: Јован Петровић, 1768–16 August 1813), known as Jovan Kursula (Јован Курсула), was a Serbian vojvoda (commander) that participated in the Serbian Revolution.

== Biography ==
Petrović was born in Donja Gorevnica, in the Rudnik okrug, near Čačak, at the time part of the Sanjak of Smederevo (now Serbia). Both his parents, Velimir and Magdalena, had ancestry from Drobnjaci in what is today Montenegro. After his father's death his mother remarried in the village of Cvetke near Kraljevo, bringing Jovan with her. Kursula had brown hair, light skin, full cheeks, youthful looks, broad shoulders. He did not carry his sabre from his waist, as did most others, but "over his shoulder, as it was easier to pull out", as he was a master of swordsmanship. He was one of the Rudnik nahija commanders, alongside Lazar Mutap, Arsenije Loma, Milić Drinčić and Milan Obrenović. At the Battle of Varvarin he had a duel against an Ottoman commander known as the "Black Arab" (Crni arapin). He died from wounds from the Battle of Deligrad.

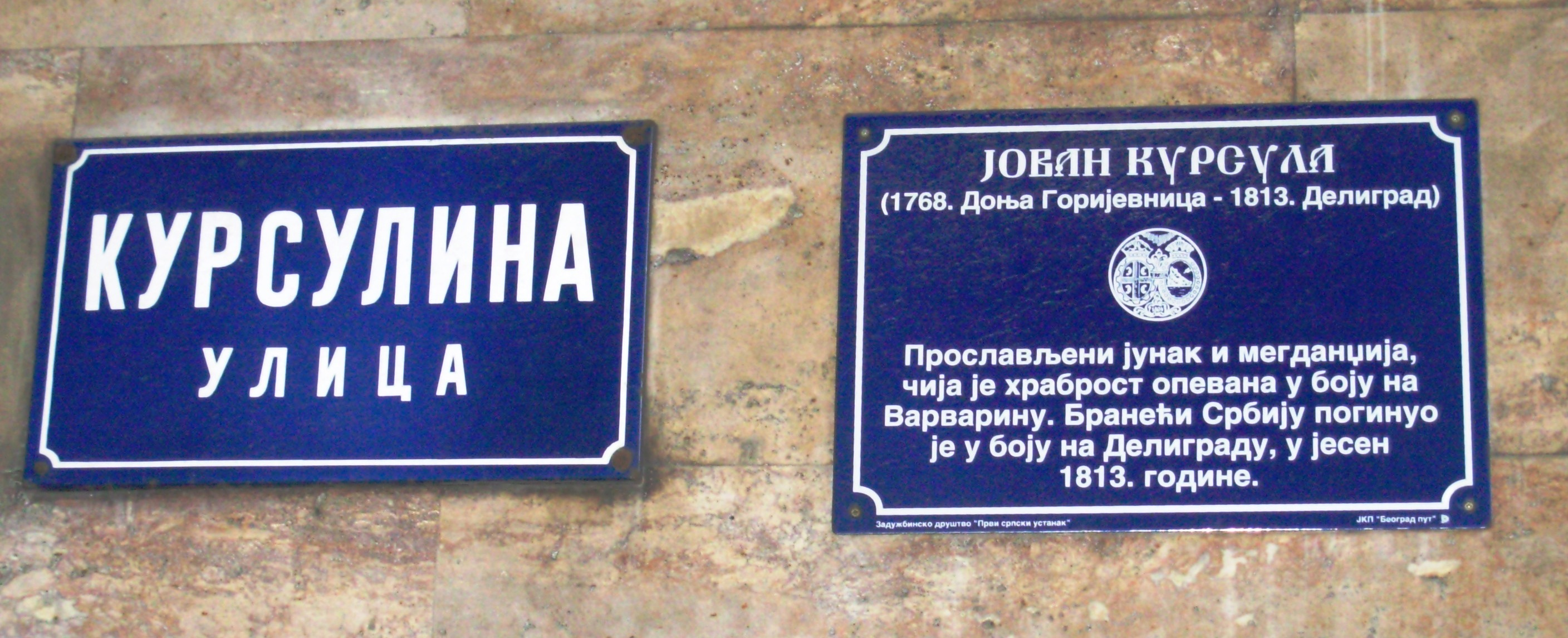
Kursula's Street in Vračar, Belgrade.

== Legacy ==
A Yugoslav Partisan detachment in Kraljevo named after him was established in 1941.

Several primary schools are named after him throughout Serbia, as well as streets in Čačak, Vračar, Niš, Užice, Gornji Milanovac, Zaječar and Zrenjanin.

== See also ==
- List of Serbian Revolutionaries

== Sources ==
- Dugalić, Miroljub (2013-09-03). "Јован Курсула – Мегданџија без титуле и власти". Magacin.
- Marković, Radul; Pantović, Miloljub S. (1996). Donja Gorevnica: zemlja i ljudi. Odbor za proučavanje sela SANU. pp. 119–121.
