= Remete =

Remete may refer to:

- Remete, Zagreb, a former village now a neighbourhood of Maksimir, Zagreb, Croatia
- Remete, Alba, the Hungarian name of Râmeț, a commune in Transylvania, Romania
- Remete, Harghita, a colloquial Hungarian name of Remetea, a commune in Transylvania, Romania
- Remete Hill, one of the Buda Hills in Budapest, Hungary
- Petar Remete (1937–2011), Croatian footballer
- A remete, a libretto by Alfred Soultan

== See also ==
- Remeta (disambiguation)
