= Battle of Bratačić =

Battle of the First Serbian Uprising

Battle of Bratačića
- Part of First Serbian uprising
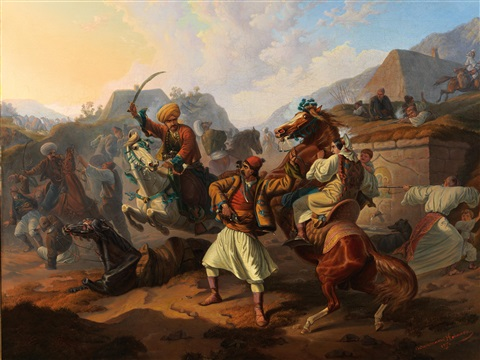
- Fighting between Serbs and Turks
| Date | 1 August 1806 |
| Location | Bratačić; Sanjak of Belgrade (today Serbia) |
| Result | Serbian victory |

Belligerents
| Revolutionary Serbia | Ottoman Empire |

Commanders and leaders
| Karađorđe Petrović | Hadži-beg |

Strength
| 1,500 infantry 200 cavalry and 2 guns | 7,000 |

Casualties and losses
| Light | Heavier than the Serbs |

Battle of Bratačić (Serbian: Битка код Братачића) took place on 1 August 1806 between Serb rebel leader Karađorđe's troops against an Ottoman Bosnian troops under Hadži-beg of Srebrenica. The battle was part of the First Serbian Uprising and ended with the victory of the Serbs.

At the beginning of the Ottoman offensive against Karađorđe's Serbia in 1806, the Ottoman Bosnian unit under the Srebrenica commander Hadži-beg, with a strength of 7,000 men, crossed the Drina and from Sokograd, through the Valjevo nahiya, attacked Palež near Obrenovac to merge with the main Ottoman Bosnian army on the way to Belgrade. At the end of July, the Turks stopped in Bratačić on 1 August while the suppressed insurgents of the Valjevo nahiya remained in the village of Osečina. Karađorđe intended to first defeat the troops under Hadži-beg, and then defeat the main Ottoman army from Bosnia, which was gathering near Šabac to attack Mišar. Because of that, Karađorđe kept 300-400 insurgents in Kličevac, and sent most of them to Osečina. The strength of the Serbian forces was 1,500 infantry with 2 cannons and 200 horsemen. The Ottomans attacked the Serbs on the same day, but seeing that they were supported by 60 cavalrymen under the command of Matija Nenadović, retreated after the first attack. The Turks thought that larger reinforcements were coming to the Serbs, so they withdrew to Bratačić. On the same day, the Serbs occupied the layout on the slopes around Bratačić and attacked the Ottomans, who retreated towards Rožanj at night and further towards the Drina. Thus, the direction from Valjevo to Obrenovac was safe for Karađorđe for the upcoming Battle of Mišar.

== See more ==
- Timeline of the Serbian Revolution
- List of Serbian Revolutionaries
