= Milić Drinčić =

Vojvoda Milić Drinčić
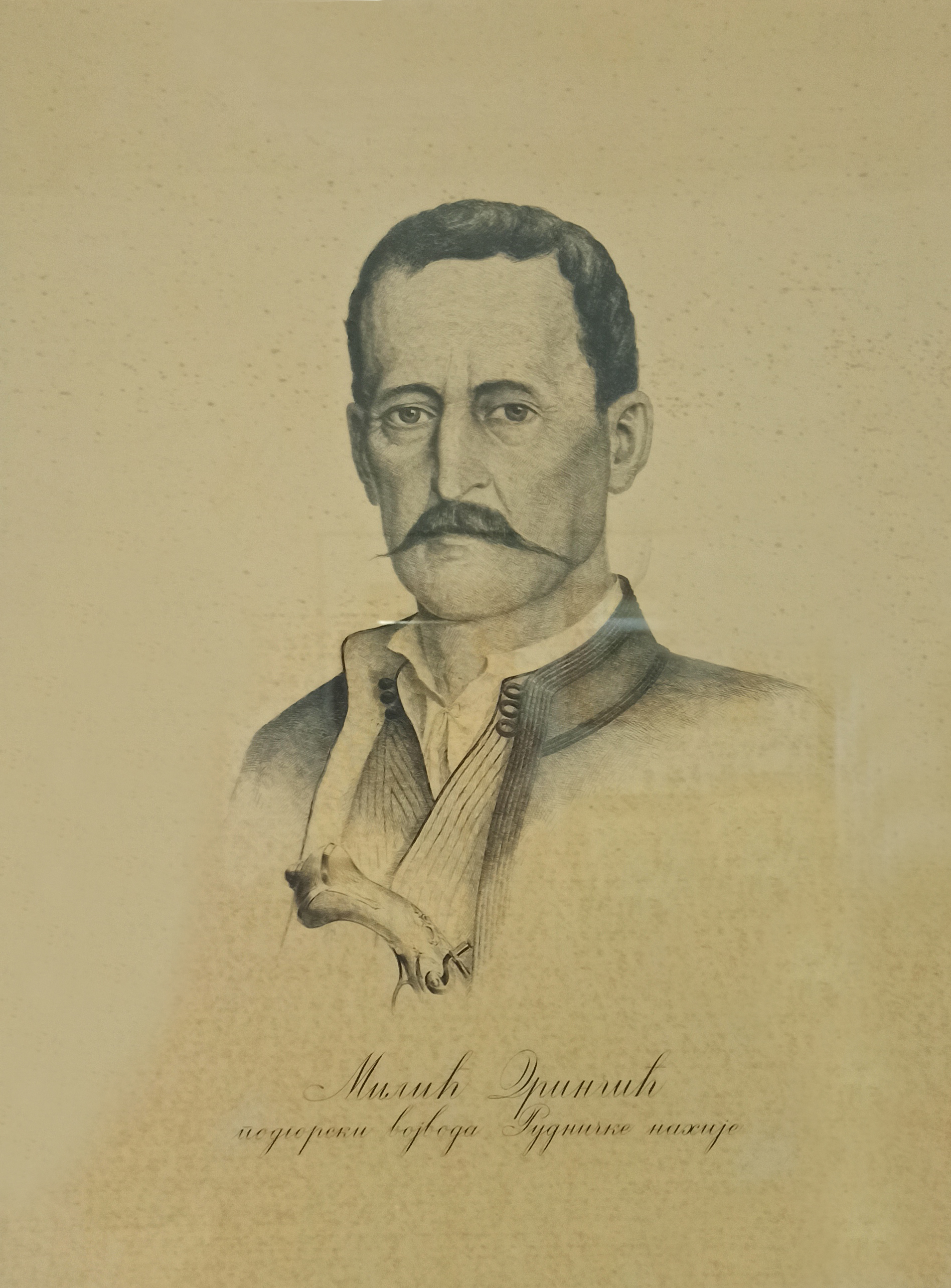
- Born: 1775 Teočin, Rudnik nahiya, Sanjak of Smederevo
- Died: 14 July 1815 (aged 39–40) Dublje, Revolutionary Serbia
- Allegiance: Revolutionary Serbia
- Service years: 1804–1815
- Rank: buljubaša (1804), vojvoda (1811)
- Conflicts: First Serbian Uprising; Second Serbian Uprising; Battle of Ljubić; Battle of Dublje

Milić Drinčić (1775–14 July 1815) was a Serbian vojvoda (general) in the First Serbian Uprising and Second Serbian Uprising.

== Biography ==
At the beginning of the first Serbian uprising in 1804, he took part in Milan Obrenović's led operations in the Rudnik area and soon achieved the rank of buljubaša. He distinguished himself in the battles near Čačak in 1805 and Užice in 1807.

At that time, Rudnik nahiya had four knežina: Brusnica, Rudnička Morava, Kačer and Crna Gora–Podgora, the last commanded by Milić Drinčić. The commander of all the mentioned knežina was vojvoda Miloš Obrenović. In 1811, Drinčić was promoted to vojvoda of Crna Gora–Podgora (the area around Takovo), and in 1813 he did not escape but surrendered to the Turks, but he was constantly on guard and in 1814 seeing that his life was in danger he defected and hid in the mountains.

Only ten months after the failed First Serbian Uprising, on August 8, 1814, a meeting of knezes and voivodes took place in Topčider with the likes of Milić Drinčić, Radovan Grbović, Aksentije Miladinović, Lazar Mutap, Arsenije Loma, Vasilije Jovanović, Panta Ilić, Milivoje Tadić, Vasilije Pavlović, Georgije Lazarević, and of course Miloš Obrenović, who inaugurated the second insurgency. and attended the meeting followed by other meetings in Rudovci and Vreoci, the meeting in Takovo. As soon as the Second Serbian Uprising broke out, Drinčić and his company successfully suppressed the Turks and contributed a lot to the victory of the insurgents in the decisive battles of both Ljubić and Dublje, where he was killed. He was killed on gate of Turkish redoubt at Dublje.

== Literature ==
- Теодосије Вукосављевић (1988), "Милић Дринчић - војвода подгорски" [Milić Drinčić - Voïvode de Podgora], Zbornik, XVIII: 143–180
- Vuk Stefanović Karadžić, Materials for Serbian History, Belgrade 1898.
- Novaković, Relja (1984). "Drinčić, Milić". Enciklopedija jugoslavije. Vol. 3. Zagreb: Miroslav Krleža Institute of Lexicography. p. 580. OCLC 23815843.
