= Remeta =

Remeta can refer to:

- Mala Remeta, a village in Srem, Vojvodina, Serbia
  - Mala Remeta Monastery
- Velika Remeta, a village in Srem, Vojvodina, Serbia
  - Velika Remeta Monastery

== See also ==
- Remete (disambiguation)
