= Melentije Stevanović =

Serbian bishop

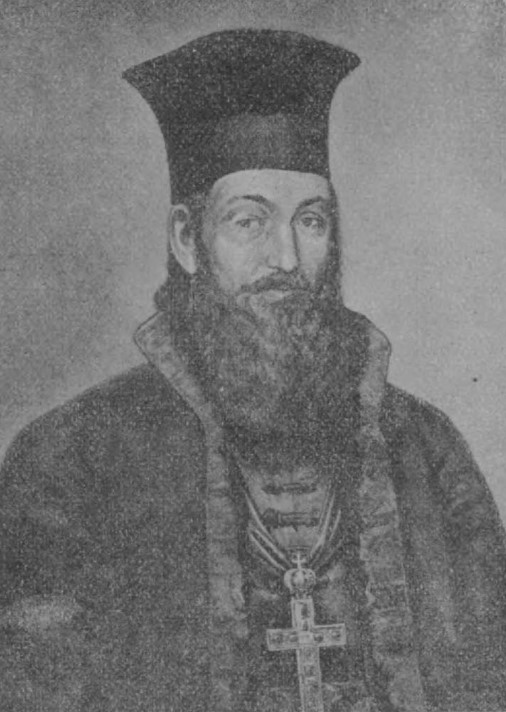
Hadži Melentije Stevanović.

Hadži Melentije Stevanović (Birač at Zvornik, or Osat, 1766 - Rača, 27 March 1824) was a restorer and archimandrite of the Rača monastery, one of the leaders of the First Serbian Uprising, Vojvode of Sokolski nahija, bishop-elected of the Eparchy of Šabac-Užice, and Metropolitan of Belgrade from 1810 to 1813.

== Biography ==
He was named Nikolayević Stevanović after his father Stevan and grandfather Nikola, of the Milićević family. He was born in 1766 in central Podrinje, though it is not known exactly whether in Birč, near Zvornik or Osat?

He acquired literacy with Vuk Karadžić at the Tronoša Monastery, where he later became a monk and was given the monastic name Melentija.In the middle of 1794 he went on an Orthodox pilgrimage, that is, a pilgrimage to the Holy Land where he received the honorific title hajji (hadži) given to all Eastern Orthodox who visit Christ's grave.

Upon his return from the tour of the tomb of Christ with the acquired grammar of the hadži, in 1795, with the help of the Ecumenical Patriarch Gerasimus III, he was granted permission to meet with Sultan Selim III, from whom he sought permission for the reconstruction of the Rača monastery. Hadži Melentije requested the Sublime Porte that he be granted the monastery property "od Šarampovine do Granovine, od Granovine do Sokolin, od Sokoline od Šarampovine" ("from Šarampovina to Granovina, from Granovina to Sokolina, from Sokolina from Šarampovina", which amounted to 1,600 hectares of land. Upon his return to the Tronoša Monastery, he chose two monks, Josif and Isaija, and went with them to Rača. With the Sultan's permission, he evicted janissaries who built an inn (han) on the ruins of the church foundation and Melentije wasted no time to begin to reconstruct the Rača Monastery anew. He built the door of the monastery temple all by himself in 1796.

== Uprising ==
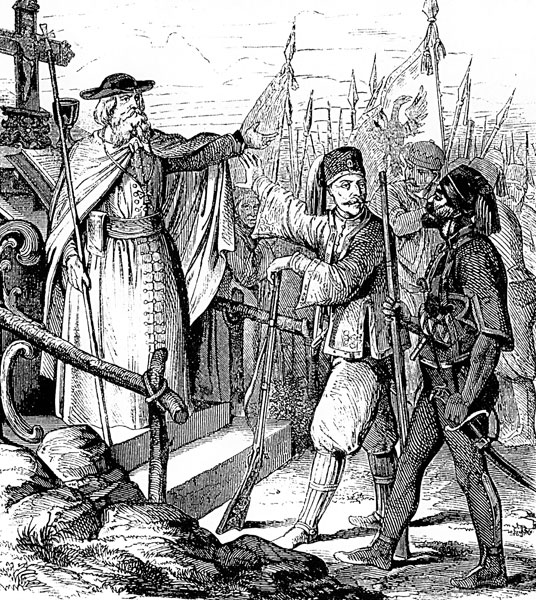
Archimandrite Melentije and rebels.

Archimandrite Melentije was the organizer of the First Serbian Uprising in Rača region from 1804 to 1813, a participant in the Orašac Assembly, and the first to advance into battle with "one cross in his hand and the other around his neck" in the Drina and Podrinje regions. In this area, together with Kara-Marko Vasić, he commanded the Serbian army. He participated in fighting with the Turks in Osat in 1804, fighting at Užice in 1805, near Soko Grad on the Drina in October 1806, Sikirić (Osat) on the Drina on 29 September 1807, and on 12 October 1807 on Drina and Osat. Together with Kara-Marko Vasić, Milan Obrenović, Mateja Nenadović and Ilija Birčanin, he led the Serbian army in the battle with the Turks at Lučindan in 1808 in Oklec, Vranjkovina in Osat, and Pribićević near Srebrenica. For the victory against the Turks in Osat and the Drina on 20 October 1807, the Russian envoy Konstantin Rodofinikin proposed Hadži Melentije and Mateja Nenadović to the Imperial Russian court to receive the coveted golden cross. When he travelled to Imperial Russia with Milan Obrenović, Božidar Grujović and Mateja Nenadović in 1810 to seek aid for the Serbian uprising, Hadži Melentije was decorated by emperor Alexander I of Russia himself with a gold cross and a gold chain.

The ruling People's Assembly (Sabor) in liberated Serbia appointed Hadži Melentije locum tenens Metropolitan of the Metropolitanate of Belgrade in 1810 instead of the quisling Metropolitan Leontije Lambrović. He was appointed bishop of the Eparchy of Šabac in 1811 for his merit in the fight for independence but was never consecrated owing to the fighting which continued without interruption. After the Ottoman quelling of the uprising in 1813, the Turks set fire to the Rača monastery and slaughtered the monks Isajia and Ignjatija. On this occasion, Hadži Melentije, together with Karađorđe, crossed over to the Austrian territory and settled in Hopovo monastery in Fruška Gora, and stayed in the monasteries of Fenek, Remeta (Note: This could have been either Mala Remeta Monastery or Velika Remeta Monastery.) and Beočin.

Hadži Melentije returned from the Austrian Empire to Rača in 1816, and rebuilt the monastery for the second time in the period from 1818 to 1823. He died on 27 March 1824 and was buried in the Rača Monastery, in the foundations of the monastery church, beneath the monument erected on the occasion of the centennial of his death.

== Legacy ==
The monument dedicated to Hadži Melentije Stevanović is located in the porta of the Rača monastery built into the very wall of the monastery church. It is made of wedding white marble. The idea for the erection of the monument was initiated in 1924 on the occasion of the 100th anniversary of the death of Hadži Melentije by the then abbot Zaharije Popović (Zdravko Popović Milekić). The work is the creation of academic painter and sculptor Mihailo Milovanović of Užice, who presented the character of Hadži Melentije after the story of Abbot Zaharije, descriptions from books and the Serbian folk song "The Beginning of the Revolt against the Dahijas". During the construction of the monument with his family, Mihailo Milovanović stayed in the monastery residence. The monument was unveiled and consecrated in the summer of 1924, and at the ceremony was welcomed by a large number of Račan district residents and Bishop Jefrem Bojović of Žiča.

== See also ==
- List of Serbian Revolutionaries

== Sources ==
- Zlatković, Branko (2020). "Beogradski mitropolit Leontije i njegov namesnik Hadži Melentije Stefanović–u usmenoj tradiciji i istoriji": 88–97.
