= Timeline of the Serbian Revolution =

Timeline of the Serbian Revolution.

== Prelude ==
- Austro-Turkish War (1788–1791)
- Janissary revolts (1793–99)
- Return of janissaries to sanjak (early 1799)
- Janissary capture of Belgrade (July 1801)
- Murder of Vizier Hadji Mustafa Pasha (15 December 1801)
- Dahije rule of Pashalik of Belgrade
- Interception of rebellion plans
- Slaughter of the Knezes (January 1804)
- Orašac Assembly (14 February 1804)

== First Serbian Uprising ==
=== 1804 ===
- Burning of the Inns (15 February 1804), rebel burning of Turk inns that were used as Dahije tools
- Meeting at Drlupa (16–18 February 1804), negotiations between Aganlija and Karađorđe, failed
- Meeting at Palanka (24–27 February 1804)
- Lipe Assembly (late February 1804), Belgrade nahiya rebel gathering
- Battle of Rudnik (4–6 March 1804), victory over Dahije and town takeover, by Karađorđe and Milan Obrenović
- Battle of Valjevo (10–12 March 1804), victory and town takeover by Nikola Grbović and Matija Nenadović
- Battle of Svileuva (c. 11 March 1804), victory over Dahije, by Jakov Nenadović
- Battle of Vrbica (14 March 1804), Dahije victory over Karađorđe, by Kučuk-Alija
- Požarevac nahija rises under Milenko Stojković (8 March 1804)
- Ćuprija skirmish (23 March 1804), victory over Alija Gušanac by Stojko Krivokuća
- Siege of Batočina and Kijevo pursuit (27–29 March 1804), victory over Dahije
- First siege of Jagodina (c. 31 March 1804), failed
- Second siege of Jagodina (c. 16 April 1804), victory and town takeover by Karađorđe and Milan Obrenović
- Battles of Ropočevo and Leštane (17–18 April), surprise attack by Karađorđe and ambush by Vasa Čarapić
- Paraćin nahija rises under Ilija Barjaktarović (April 1804)
- Siege of Šabac (19 March–1 May 1804) by Jakov Nenadović and Luka Lazarević
- Ottoman Bosnian reinforcements to the Dahije arrive at Lešnica (22 April 1804)
- Battle of Čokešina (28 April 1804), decisive Dahije-Bosnian victory
- Vidajić and Nožina retreat to Bosnia (1 May 1804)
- Ostružnica Assembly (24 April–3 May 1804)
- Zemun Meeting (10 May 1804)
- Vračar sortie (10 May 1804)
- Siege of Požarevac (March–late May 1804), by Milenko Stojković, reinforced by Karađorđe and Jakov
- Siege of Smederevo (June 1804), by Karađorđe
- Battles of Podrinje (July–August 1804), at Šurice, Krupanj, Loznica and Lešnica
- Bekir Pasha's Mission (July–October 1804)
- Mus-aga at Šabac (6 August 1804)
- Murder of Đorđe Ćurčija by Jakov Nenadović and Sima Marković
- Podrinje truce with Mehmed-kapetan Vidajić
- Battle of Osat (1804)
- Assassination of the Dahije (25 July 1804)
- Serbian delegation sent to St. Petersburg (1 September 1804)
- Serbian delegation meets with Russian Foreign Minister Czartoryski (twice in November 1804)

=== 1805 ===
- Attack on Šabac (3 January 1805), failed
- Battle of Čačak (5 April [O.S. 24 March] 1805), Serbian victory
- Pećani Assembly (17 April 1805)
- Army muster in Topola for takeover of Karanovac (early June 1805)
- Raids on Užice and Nova Varoš (5 June 1805)
- Battle of Karanovac (29 June–1 July 1805)
- Ottoman Bosnian general attack failure (late July 1805)
- Siege of Užice (29 July–1 August 1805)
- Battle of Adakale (August 1805), Dahije leaders killed
- Borak Assembly (15 August 1805)
- Battle of Ivankovac (18 August [O.S. 7 August] 1805), victory over Hafiz Pasha
- Smederevo Assembly (25–30 November 1805)
- Peace of Pressburg (26 December 1805), French-Austrian peace, Venetia, Istria and Dalmatia incorporated into Napoleon's Italy

=== 1806 ===
- Siege of Šabac (January 1806)
- Ottoman offensive on Valjevo and Šabac (late January 1806)
- Battle of Zičko Polje (early 1806)
- Hasan-paša Srebrenički defeated (February 1806)
- Karađorđe surrounded at Žičko polje (early 1806)
- Fight at Jelenča (early 1806)
- Start of Paraćin-Ražanj-Aleksinac-Kruševac campaign (26 January 1806)
- Battle of Dživdžibare (springtime 1806)
- Battle of Čučuge (3 April 1806)
- Battle of Duge Njive (July 1806)
- Russian cavalry captain Ilija Trebinjski sent by general Michelsohnen to Serbia (mid-1806)
- Battle of Bratačić (1 August 1806), Serbian victory
- Pursuit of Hadži-beg into Bosnia (August 1806)
- Battle of Mišar (12–15 August 1806), decisive Serbian victory
- Pursuit of Ottoman Bosnian troops across the Sava (after 15 August 1806)
- Ambush at Kitog (after 15 August 1806)
- Takeover of Aleksinac and Sokobanja (1806)
- Battle of Dživdžibare (1806), decisive Serbian victory
- Battle of Sikirić (29 September 1806)
- Smederevo Assembly (1–5 November 1806)
- Battle of Deligrad (December 1806), Serbian victory
- Siege of Belgrade (November–December 1806), Serbian victory

=== 1807 ===
- Ičko's Peace (13 July 1806–January 1807), failed
- Death of Osman Pazvantoğlu (27 January 1807)
- Mulla Pasha becomes new Pasha of Sanjak of Vidin (February 1807)
- Battle of Loznica (1807)
- Belgrade Assembly (25 February–6 March 1807), including decision to ally with Russia
- Surrender of Osman Bey at Podgorac (1807)
- Battle of Vrbovac (1807), Veljko led defeat of Süleyman of Zaječar
- Siege of Gurgusovac (1807), failed
- Siege of Zaječar (1807), failed
- Battle of Štubik and Malajnica (1 July 1807), Serbian victory
- Takeover of Zaječar, Negotin, Gurgusovac and Banja (1807)
- Treaty of Tilsit (7 July 1807), between the French and Russia
- Russian–Serbian Alliance (10 July 1807)

=== 1808 ===
- Battles of Podrinje (April–November 1808), including battles at Krupanj, Soko, Srebrenica, Rožanj, Rađevo polje, Žiča, Loznica
  - Krupanj, victory against Ali Bey Vidajić
  - Rožanj, victory against Hasan Pasha and Hadji Sali Bey
- Kruščica Rebellion (12 July 1808)
- Battles of Oklenac, Vranjkovina and Pribićevac (31 October 1808)
- Belgrade Assembly (14–15 December 1808)

=== 1809 ===
- Battle of Jasika
- Battle of Prahovo
- Siege of Niš (May 1809)
- Battle of Belogradchik (1809)
- Capture of Sjenica (May 1809)
- Battle of Čegar (31 May 1809), Ottoman victory
- Battle of Suvodol (late May 1809), Serbian victory
- Battle of Rassowa (16 September 1809), Russian victory (Russo-Turkish War)
- Palanka Assembly (2–8 October 1809)
- Battle of Tataritsa (21 October 1809), Ottoman victory (Russo-Turkish War)

=== 1810 ===
- Belgrade Assembly (1–2 January 1810)
- Battle on the Drina (1810)
- Battle of Varvarin (5 September 1810), Serbian victory
- Battle of Batin (9 September 1810), Russian victory (Russo-Turkish War)
- Battle of Loznica (17–18 October 1810), Serbian victory

=== 1811 ===
- Belgrade Assembly (1–12 January 1811)
- Battle of Gramada (22–23 October 1811), Serbian victory
- Battle of Slobozia (28 August–14 November 1811), Russian victory (Russo-Turkish War)

=== 1812 ===
- Signing of Treaty of Bucharest (28 May 1812)
- Ratification of Treaty of Bucharest (5 July 1812)
- Topola Assembly (17 July 1812)
- Vraćevšnica Assembly (15–16 August 1812)

=== 1813 ===
- Kragujevac Assembly (1–2 January 1813)
- Battle of Lešnica (1813)
- Battle of Mačva
- Ottoman offensives from Vidin on Negotin, from Niš on Deligrad and from Bosnia on Drina (June-July 1813)
- Siege of Negotin (11 July–10 August 1813), decisive Ottoman victory
- Battle of Loznica (August 1813), decisive Ottoman victory
- Battle of Ravnje (August 1813), decisive Ottoman victory
- Return of Ottoman rule to the sanjak

== Interlude ==
- Belgrade slave market
- Robbery of Latif Agha's men at Trnava monastery (late September 1814)
- Hadži Prodan's Revolt (27 September–30 December 1814)
- Belgrade Executions (December 1814–30 January 1815)
- Assassinations of Milija Zdravković and Stanoje Glavaš
- Rudovci Meeting (late February 1815), leaders from Belgrade, Valjevo and Rudnik nahiyas meet regarding a new uprising.
- Vreoci Meeting (5 March 1815), leaders from Belgrade, Valjevo and Rudnik nahiyas meet regarding a new uprising.
- Rudovci Meeting 19 April [O.S. 7 April] 1815), leaders meet at the house of priest Ranko and decide that Miloš Obrenović lead the uprising. Armed conflict began the next day.

== Second Serbian Uprising ==
- Battle of Rudnik (20 April 1815), under Arsenije Loma
- Takovo Meeting (23 April 1815)
- Battle of Palež
- Battle of Čačak (13 April–1 June 1815)
  - Battle of Ljubić (8 May 1815)
- Stol skirmish (June 1815), rebel retreat to Maglič
- Battle of Požarevac (1–7 July 1815)
- Siege of Karanovac (Early July 1815), siege, handover of town
- Battle of Dublje (25–26 July 1815)

== Peace-time ==
- Marashli–Miloš talks (summer 1815)
- Marashli–Miloš draft (November 1815)
- National Chancellery proclaimed on 9 November 1815 a peaceful state in the Pashalik and Serbian-Turkish relations
- Crnuća Assembly (19 December 1815)
- Porte issues eight fermans to Marashli for the status of Serbs in the Pashalik. (beginning of 1816)
- Belgrade Assembly (11 May 1816)
- Belgrade Assembly (6 November 1817)

== See also ==
- Revolutionary Serbia
- List of Serbian Revolutionaries
- Assemblies of the Serbian Revolution

== Sources ==
- Batalaka, Lazar Arsenijević (1898). Историја српског устанка. Vol. I. Izd. Batalakinoga fonda.
- Nenadović, Konstantin N. (1903) [1883]. Живот и дела великог Ђорђа Петровића Кара-Ђорђа. Vol. I (2 ed.). Belgrade: Штампа Савића и Комп. – via Archive.org.
- Nenadović, Konstantin N. (1884). Живот и дела великог Ђорђа Петровића Кара-Ђорђа. Vol. II (1 ed.). Vienna: У Штампарији Јована Н. Вернаја – via Google Books.
- Protić, Kosta (1893). "Ратни догађаји из првога српског устанка под Карађорђем Петровићем 1804—1813". Годишњица Николе Чупића. XIII. Državna štamparija.
