= Prislonica =

Village in Moravica District, Serbia

- Town
- Location within Serbia
- Coordinates: 43°57′11″N 20°26′16″E
- Country: Serbia
- District: Moravica District
- Municipality: Čačak

Area
  - Total: 22.12 km^{2} (8.54 sq mi)
- Elevation: 344 m (1,129 ft)

Population (2011)
  - Total: 1,424
  - Density: 64.38/km^{2} (166.7/sq mi)
- Time zone: UTC+1 (CET)
  - Summer (DST): UTC+2 (CEST)

Prislonica is a village in the municipality of Čačak, Serbia. According to the 2011 census, the village has a population of 1,424 people.
