= Gornja Trepča, Serbia =

Gornja Trepča Горња Трепча
- Village
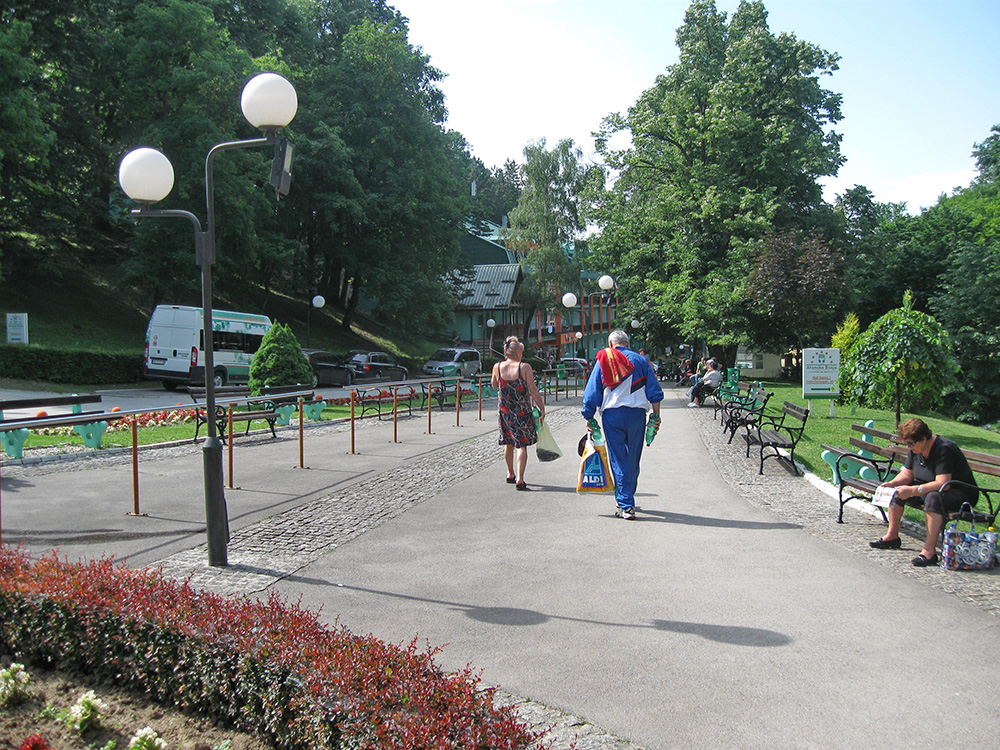
- Atomska Banja spa center

- Location within Serbia
- Coordinates: 43°56′40″N 20°28′47″E
- Country: Serbia
- District: Moravica District
- Municipality: Čačak

Area
  - Total: 11.37 km^{2} (4.39 sq mi)
- Elevation: 465 m (1,526 ft)

Population (2011)
  - Total: 556
  - Density: 48.9/km^{2} (127/sq mi)
- Time zone: UTC+1 (CET)
  - Summer (DST): UTC+2 (CEST)

Gornja Trepča (Serbian Cyrillic: Горња Трепча) is a village and spa located in the municipality of Čačak, Serbia. As of 2011 census, the village has a population of 556 inhabitants. The Atomska Banja spa center is located in the village; it has waters rich in sulfur and sodium infused with traces of uranium and radon.

== See also ==
- List of spa towns in Serbia
