= Dublje (Svilajnac) =

Coordinates: 44°48′02″N 19°30′29″E

- Village
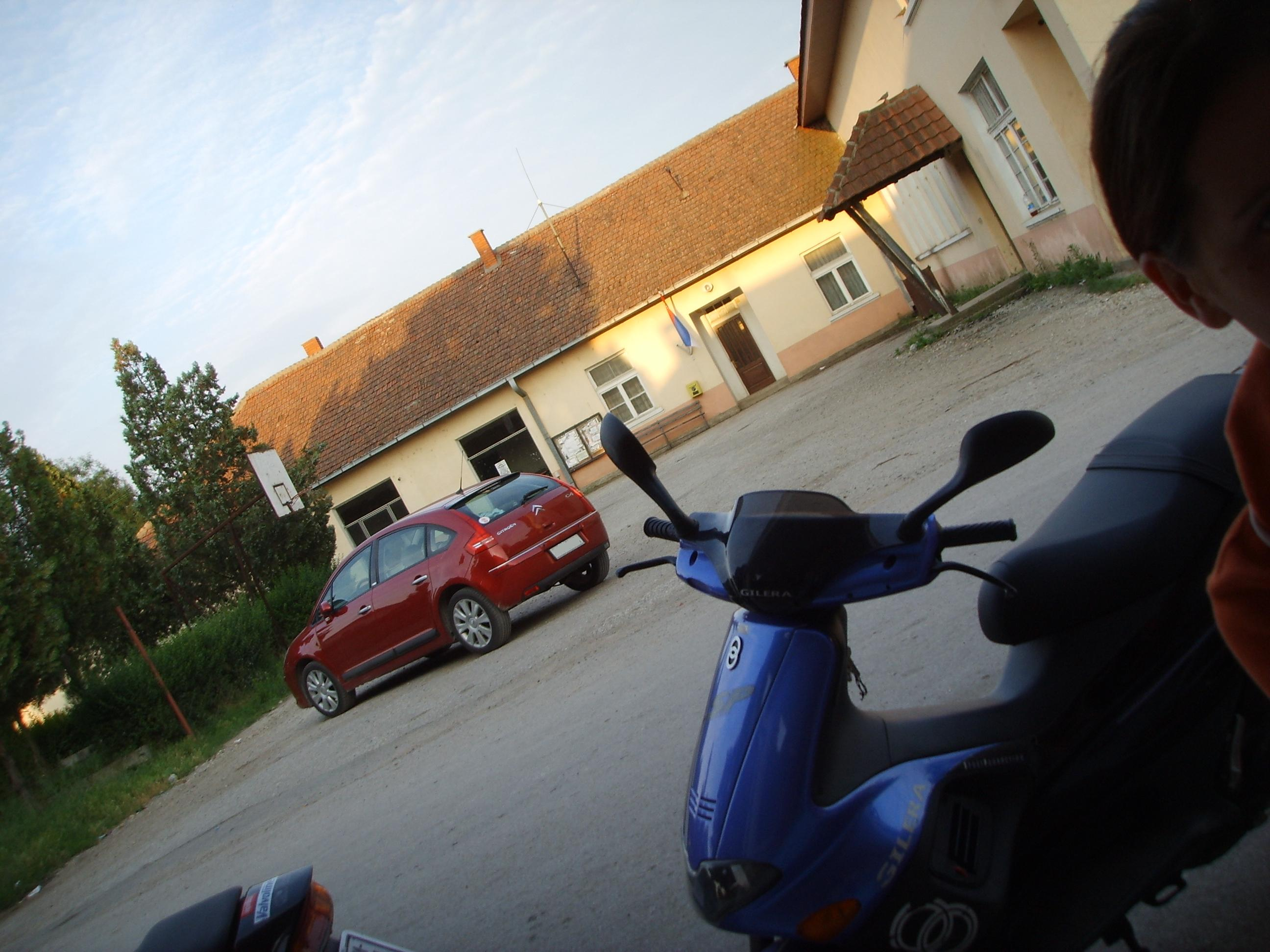
- Dublje center stage
- Interactive map of Dublje
- Country: Serbia
- Time zone: UTC+1 (CET)
  - Summer (DST): UTC+2 (CEST)

Dublje (Serbian Cyrillic: Дубље) is a village in Serbia. It is located in the Svilajnac municipality, in the Pomoravlje District. According to 2002 census, its population numbers 1,050 people. There is a book about Dublje.

== Geography ==
Dublje is located 3 kilometers from the center of Svilajnac, in the Central Serbia region (GPS: 44.203666, 21.206333). The village is situated on a high plain beneath the hill Hum.

== See also ==
- List of places in Serbia
