= Nahiye (Ottoman) =

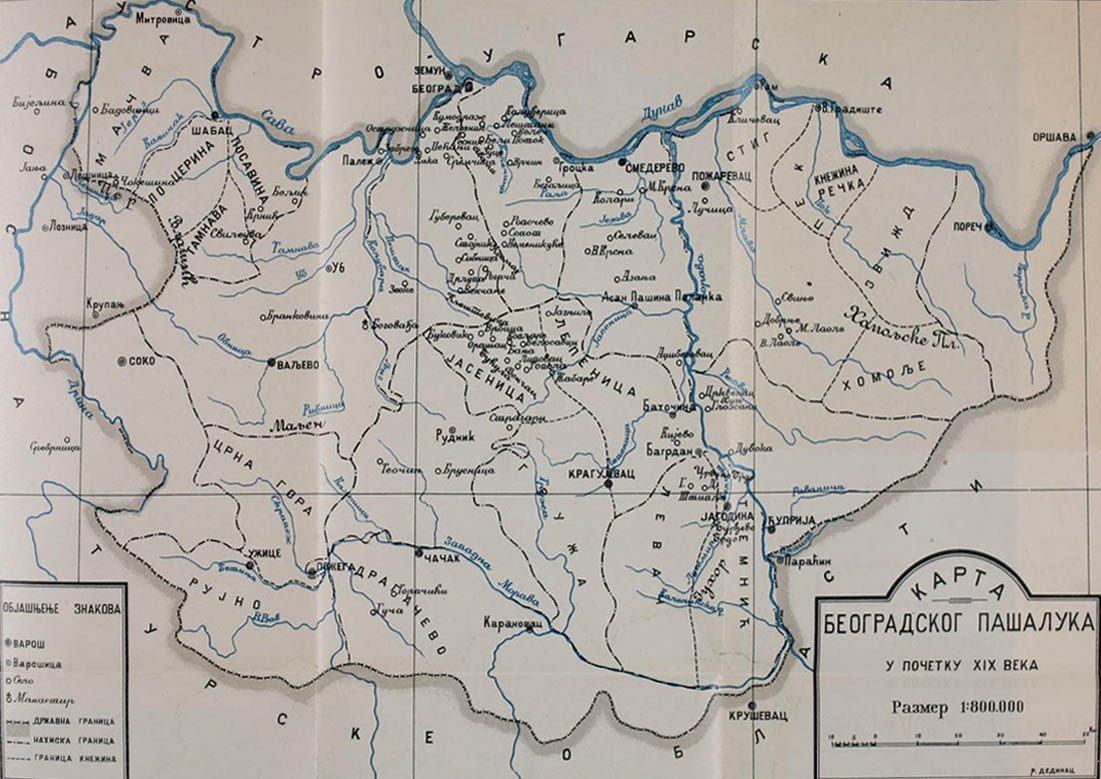
Map of the Sanjak of Smederevo in the beginning of the 19th century, showing nahiye division.

The nahiye or nahiya (Ottoman Turkish: ناحیه, from Arabic: nāḥiya) was an administrative division in the Ottoman Empire, a sub-district including several villages, being the smallest administrative unit of a sanjak, below that of the kaza. The governor of the nahiye was titled mütesellim, until its abolishment in 1842.

== History ==
=== Ottoman Empire ===
In the 15th century, the kaza included mostly several nahiye or vilayet, though the boundaries of kaza and nahiye/vilayet sometimes coincided. The kaza was administrated by the kadi (judge) but his administrative application was not yet acquired as in the later period. The reforms of Suleyman the Magnificent (r. 1520–66) stabilized terminology and transformed the nahiye into a subdivision of a kaza, while the vilayet became mainly a fiscal administrative unit for tax collection (the cizye). The administrative hierarchy eyalet—sanjak—kaza—nahiye can be seen from 1550.

Levels in 18th c.
| eyalet | beylerbey |
| sanjak | sanjak-bey |
| kaza | kadi |
| nahiye | mütesellim |
| village | muhtar |

The title of mütesellim was abolished in 1842. The Vilayet Law (1864) saw a general reorganization, with the hierarchy vilayet—sanjak—kaza—nahiye, administrated by the Vali under whose authority was the mutasarrif of the sanjak appointed by the Sultan, the kaymakam of the kaza appointed by the Interior Ministry, the mudür of the nahiye, the muhtar of the village. The three higher levels were to have administrative councils. The 1871 revisions saw the nahiye (a collection of villages or farms) the intermediate between kaza and villages, administrated by a mudür and its own administrative council.

=== Successor states in the Balkans ===
The administrative unit continued its use in the liberated states of the Balkans, Serbia and Montenegro, as nahija (Serbian Cyrillic: нахија), where it was the highest administrative unit. The Principality of Serbia had 12 nahija, each having 2–8 knežine, and each knežina having several villages. The nahija were Šabac, Valjevo, Soko, Užice, Požega, Rudnik, Kragujevac, Jagodina, Ćuprija, Požarevac, Smederevo and Beograd. In 1833 another six nahija, Krajina, Crna Reka, Paraćin, Kruševac, Stari Vlah, and Jadar-Rađevina, were transferred to Serbia by Sultan Mahmud II. In 1834 the former Ottoman administrative units were abolished, replaced with five serdarstvo, 19 okrug and 61 kapetanija (renamed srez in 1835).

Austro-Hungarian rule in Bosnia and Herzegovina began in 1878 and while they left the geographical division untouched, they replaced the names of units, thus the Bosnia Vilayet was renamed Reichsland, sanjak as Kreis, kaza as Bezirk and nahiye as Expositur.

== Sources ==
- Çetinsaya, Gökhan (2006). The Ottoman Administration of Iraq, 1890-1908. Routledge. ISBN 978-1-134-29494-7.
- Cvijetić, Leposava (1984). Milić, Danica (ed.). "Popis 1834". Мешовита грађа [Miscellanea]. 13. Istorijski institut: 9–118.
- Imamović, Mustafa (1997). Pravni položaj i unutrašnji politički razvitak Bosne i Hercegovine od 1878. do 1914. Bosanski kulturni centar.
- Petrović, Mita (1898). Finansije i ustanove obnovljene Srbije do 1842 II: Drugi ustanak, finansiranje i narodni prihodi do 1835 po originalnim dokumentima. Belgrade: Državna štamparija.
- Gradeva, Rositsa (2004). Rumeli Under the Ottomans, 15th-18th Centuries: Institutions and Communities. Isis Press. ISBN 978-975-428-271-9.
