= Arsenije Loma =

Serbian voivode (military commander)

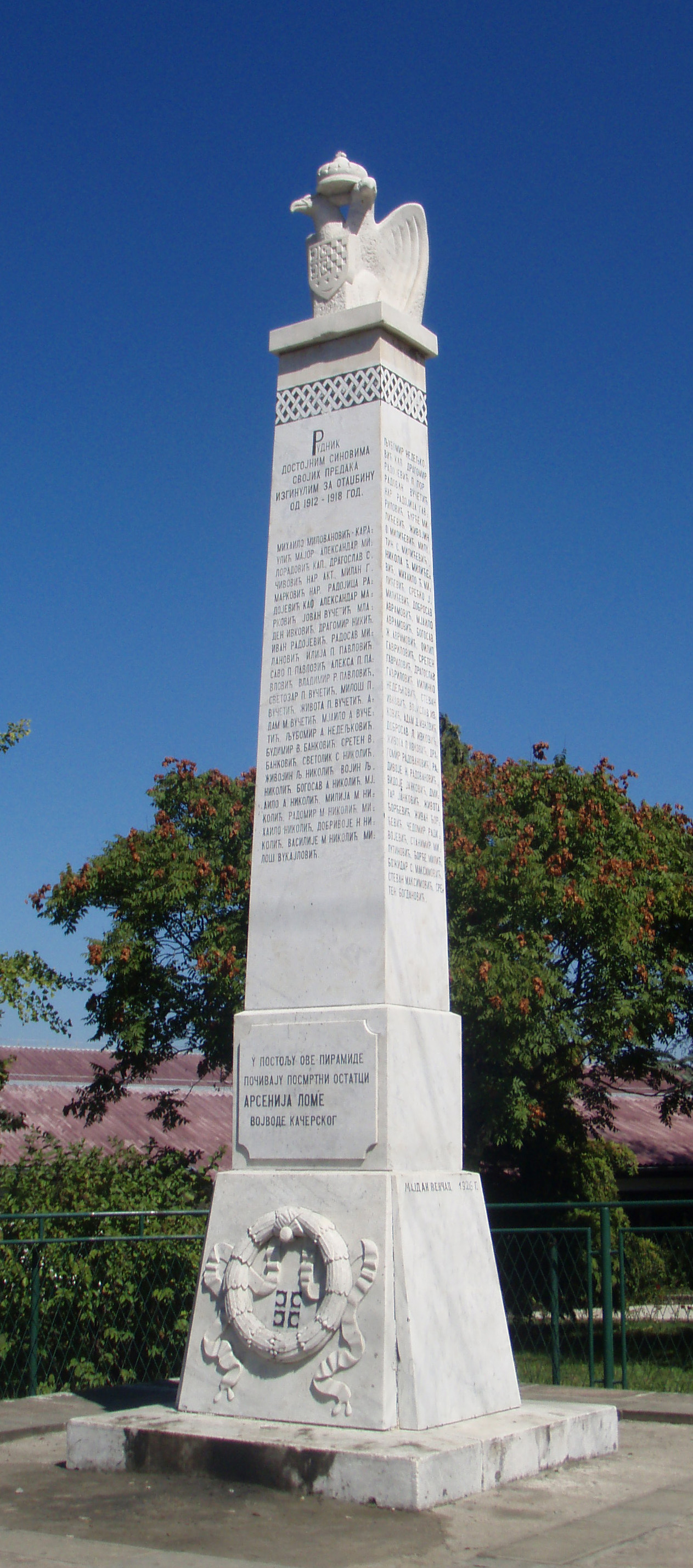
- Monument
- Born: 1768; Gojna Gora, Sanjak of Smederevo, Ottoman Empire (modern Serbia)
- Died: 1815 (aged 46–47); Brusnica, Revolutionary Serbia (modern Serbia)
- Military career
- Allegiance: (Serbia) Serbian revolutionaries (1804-1815)
- Service years: 1804 - 1815
- Rank: buljubaša (tr. Bölükbaşı, en. "division captain")
- Unit: Kačer (1811-1815)
- Conflicts: First Serbian Uprising (1804-1813); Second Serbian Uprising (1815)

Arsenije Loma (Serbian Cyrillic: Арсеније Лома; 1768–1815) was a Serbian voivode (military commander) in the First and Second Serbian Uprising of the Serbian Revolution (1804–1817). He was appointed by Karađorđe to command Kačer in 1811.

== Life ==
Loma was born in Gojna Gora, to father Joksim, who after the settling of new inhabitants, immediately after the birth of Arsenije, relocated to Dragolj, in the Rudnik nahija. Arsenije took his nickname Lomo from the river Lovnica (formerly Lomnica), which lies in Gojna Gora. He had a sister, Pauna, who later married Milutin Savić-Garašanin, who together had three sons, one of whom was Ilija Garašanin, the Serbian Prime Minister 1861–1867.

He was one of the initiators of the First Serbian Uprising. He fought under the command of Milan Obrenović at the Battle of Rudnik, in which he showed heroic deeds. At the end of February 1804, at the beginning of the First Serbian Uprising, 500 rebels commanded by Arsenije Loma and Petar Trešnjevčanin besieged Rudnik which was under control of Sali Aga supported by Ali Aga Džavić from Užice and Pljako from Karanovac (modern-day Kraljevo) and their 500 Janissary. He gained the rank of buljubaša in Kačer. He was wounded several times, some of the wounds never healed. In 1811 he was appointed the voivode (top commander) of Kačer by Karađorđe.

The nephew of Aga Tokatlić murdered Loma in revenge.

Today's families of Lomić, Loma, Lomović and Lomigorić are considered his descendants.

Several streets are named after him in Serbia.

== See also ==
- List of Serbian Revolutionaries
