= Konstantin Nenadović =

Serbian officer and historian (1822–1900)

Konstantin N. Nenadović
- Born: January 28, 1822; Brankovina, Principality of Serbia
- Died: April 18, 1900 (aged 78); Vienna, Austria-Hungary
- Other name: Kosta
- Occupations: Officer, historian
- Notable work: Život i dela velikog Đorđa Petrovića Kara-Đorđa

Konstantin N. Nenadović (Serbian: Константин Н. Ненадовић, 1822–1900) also Kosta Nenadović (Koста) was a Serbian officer and historian. In 1883–84, he published a two-volume biography on Karađorđe, in which he gave a list and biography of notables of the First Serbian Uprising (1804–13).

== Life ==
Konstantin N. Nenadović was born on 16 January (Julian calendar) or 28 January 1822 (Gregorian Calendar) in Brankovina to father Nikola Nenadović and mother Stanojka. His father Nikola was the eldest son of Prince Aleksa Nenadović. Konstantin's uncles were Proto Matija Nenadović and Duke Sima Nenadović. From the age of seven, he studied privately in Brankovina, and then he studied at the school, which was built together in Brankovina by his father and uncle Matija Nenadović. In 1833 he went to live with his father's uncle Jakov Nenadović in Valjevo, where he continued his education. He enjoyed great love and attention from Jakov Nenadović and was educated there until August 1835 when he returned to Brankovina at the request of uncle Matija. After a one-and-a-half-year break, in 1837 he was back in Valjevo, where he attended high school, graduating in 1840. In 1840, he was sent by Jevrem Nenadović to his daughter Anka Topalović to attend college in Kragujevac where he graduated in the fall of 1842.

He joined the Serbian army and artillery in October 1842. He was promoted in 1844 to lieutenant of the gunner's battery. When the foundry in Belgrade was founded in 1849, Kosta Nenadović was appointed its deputy manager. They made 17 moulds and cannons, but none was good, and Kosta accused the manager of Neprek of that, who, according to the commission, sabotaged the whole business. After the dismissal of Neprek, a new foundry was established in Kragujevac, and the main expert was a Frenchman by the name Lubr. In September 1850 when the Military Academy in Belgrade was founded under the administration of František Zach, Konstantin was immediately appointed deputy director and teacher of the new military academy. He taught at the Military Academy for the next six years. He taught the cadets practical and theoretical artillery knowledge. In February 1856, he was given the task of establishing a laboratory in Kragujevac, in which combat ammunition for rifles and cannons was to be produced and manufactured. He was promoted to artillery captain in 1856. By the end of 1858, he was chief of the artillery administration of the Belgrade battery.

In 1858, during the conflict between the prince and the council, as a cousin of Princess Persida, he was one of the main supporters of Prince Aleksandar Karađorđević. The prince's pastor Jovan Lukavčević commanded the Belgrade garrison, and Kosta commanded the artillery. During the session of the Saint Andrew's Day Assembly in December 1858. Kosta Nenadović intended to disperse the people in front of the assembly with cannon fire and then with one division of the army to occupy the assembly. Lukavčević detained Kosta Novaković just before Kosta intended to issue a command to disperse the people in front of the assembly with cannon fire. Kosta later denied this in the investigation. He could have started the civil war in Serbia with his action. As early as 25 December 1858, Jovan Lukavčević, Kosta Nenadović and Milivoje Petrović Blaznavac, as representatives of the army, came to the assembly and declared that the army was joining the people. After the arrival of Prince Miloš Obrenović at the beginning of 1859, Konstantin was arrested. In March 1859, Kosta moved to Austria immediately after that. He travelled through Bavaria and Wallachia. He was closely monitored by the Serbian authorities because he was friends with members of the family of the deposed prince.

At the beginning of 1862, Prince Mihailo Obrenović invited Konstantin to return to Serbia. He was appointed commander of the Belgrade artillery in March 1862. He was appointed commander of the Šabac People's Battery in April 1863, and commander of the Šabac city and light battery in May 1867. He remained in Šabac until the assassination of Prince Mihailo on June 10, 1868. Because of his alleged participation in that conspiracy, Kosta's relatives Svetozar Nenadović, Mladen Nenadović and Sima Nenadović were shot for sedition. Immediately after that Kosta was replaced. After six weeks, Kosta's position as commander was restored, though that decision was soon overturned, leaving him without a job and a pension.

Immediately after that, in August 1869, Kosta went back to Austria. He learned through acquaintances that Prince Milan Obrenović had nothing against him, so he returned to Belgrade in September 1873, but the governor of Belgrade, Živojin Blaznavac, immediately expelled him from Belgrade to Austria. From then on he lived in Vienna, though making the occasional visit to Belgrade. He died on 18 April 1900 in Vienna.

== Work ==
He authored a two-volume biography of Karađorđe Život i dela velikog Đorđa Petrovića Kara-Đorđa in 1883 and 1884 in Vienna. The books give the most accurate list of Karađorđe's elders, dukes and princes in the nahijas. For each of them, he recorded the year of birth and death, rank and gave a brief description of their life. The books cover the retributions that affected both Serbia and the Ottoman Empire immediately after the peace treaties were signed and long after.

- Nenadović, Konstantin N. (1883). Живот и дела великог Ђорђа Петровића Кара-Ђорђа. Vol. 1 (1 ed.).
  - Nenadović, Konstantin N. (1903). Живот и дела великог Ђорђа Петровића Кара-Ђорђа. Vol. 1 (2 ed.). Belgrade: Штампа Савића и Комп.
- Nenadović, Konstantin N. (1884). Живот и дела великог Ђорђа Петровића Кара-Ђорђа. Vol. 2 (1 ed.). Vienna: У Штампарији Јована Н. Вернаја.

== See also ==
- Matija Nenadović

== Sources ==
- Savić, Velibor Berko (2004). Nenadovići. ISBN 86-903169-1-4.
- Stojančević, Vladimir (1994). Prvi srpski ustanak: ogledi i studije (in Serbian). Vojna knj.
- "The South Slav Journal". The South Slav Journal. 7. Dositey Obradovich Circle. 1984.
