= List of people of the First Serbian Uprising =

List of participants in the First Serbian Uprising (1804–1813)

List of people of the First Serbian Uprising, active in the period of 1804–1813. It includes Serbian rebels (revolutionaries, army members) and politicians, diplomats and others, as well as Ottoman personnel and statesmen, and foreign diplomacy.

== Serbian generals ==
This group includes the most notable and distinguished Serbian generals, known for their prowess.

| Name | Lifespan | Rank | Notes |
|---|---|---|---|
Commander-in-chief
| Đorđe Petrović-Karađorđe | 1768–1817 | Vožd (1804–13) | Free Corps veteran, led the First Serbian Uprising as the most able of commanders in Šumadija. Regarded Father of the Nation. |
Main generals
| Jakov Nenadović | 1765–1836 | vojvoda of Valjevo nahija (1808) popečitelj (minister) of internal affairs | Merchant by trade, brother of Aleksa, and a top commander. Minister of Internal Affairs. |
| Stanoje Stamatović-Glavaš | 1763–1815 | vojvoda of Jasenička (Smederevska) knežina | Karađorđe's friend, former hajduk leader. Killed in the aftermath of Hadži-Prodan's rebellion. |
| Stojan Čupić-Zmaj | 1765–1815 | vojvoda of Mačvanska knežina | Merchant by trade, based in Mačva. Killed at the start of the second uprising. |
| Hajduk-Veljko Petrović | 1780–1813 | vojvoda of Krajinska nahija (1811–13) vojvoda of Banjska knežina buljubaša (1807) | Former hajduk under Stanoje Glavaš, fell at Negotin. |
| Janko Katić | 1770s–1806 | knez and vojvoda of Turija (1804) | Militia veteran, Karađorđe's friend and second-in-command. |
| Milan Obrenović | 1770–1810 | vojvoda of Rudnik nahija starešina of Rudnik nahija (1804) | Former cattle trader, brother of Jevrem, Jovan and Miloš. |
| Milenko Stojković | 1769–1831 | vojvoda (1807–11) bimbaša (1804) | Free Corps veteran. Assassinated the Dahije leaders at Adakale. Promoted to vojvoda in 1807 during the Russian campaign by Karađorđe. Rival of Karađorđe after 1809, deported in 1811 after conflict. |
| Petar Teodorović-Dobrnjac | 1771–1831 | vojvoda in Mlava bimbaša (1805) buljubaša under Milenko (1804) | Former hajduk, merchant by trade. Diplomat during the second uprising. |

== Serbian lesser commanders ==
| Name | Lifespan | Rank | Notes |
|---|---|---|---|
| Mladen Milovanović | c. 1760–1823 | vojvoda Prime Minister of Serbia (1807–10); Minister of Defense (1811–13) | Merchant by trade, politician. Although holding the highest of military and political ranks, historiography attributes campaign losses to him. |
| Miloš Obrenović | 1780–1860 | vojvoda | Brother of Milan, Jakov and Jevrem. Stayed put. Led Second Serbian Uprising. Managed to gain semi-autonomy under Ottoman vassalage. |
| Luka Lazarević-Pop Luka | 1774–1852 | vojvoda in Posavina and Tamnava | Priest, regarded especially heroic. Exiled in Russia. |
| Stevan Sinđelić | 1771–1809 | vojvoda in Resava | Free Corps veteran and 1803 conspirator, served as knez of Grabovac and then obor-knez of Resava prior to the uprising. Main leader in Resava. Fell heroically at Čegar. |
| Ilija Barjaktarović | 1771–1828 | vojvoda of Paraćin nahija (1805–09) | Garrisoned at Deligrad (1809–13). |
| Vasilije-Vasa Čarapić | 1768–1806 | vojvoda of Grocka nahija (1805–06) knez | Free Corps veteran, Mustafa Pasha's militia veteran, fell at Belgrade. |
| Hadži-Prodan Gligorijević | 1760–1825 | vojvoda of Stari Vlah | From Sjenica, lived in Požega nahija. Led Hadži-Prodan's rebellion in 1814. Joined the Greek Revolution in 1821. |
| Sima Marković | 1768–1817 | vojvoda of Posavska knežina knez | Merchant by trade, Karađorđe's friend. Finance Minister (1811–13). |
| Arsenije Loma | 1768–1815 | vojvoda of Kačer knežina (1811) buljubaša of Kačer knežina (1804) | Free Corps veteran. A captain under Milan Obrenović in the early years. One of the main commanders in the Rudnik nahija. Nearest circle of Miloš Obrenović in 1815. |
| Lazar Mutap | 1775–1815 | vojvoda in Rudnik nahija (1811) buljubaša of Rudnička Morava knežina (1804) | A captain under Milan Obrenović in the early years. One of the main commanders in the Rudnik nahija. Nearest circle of Miloš Obrenović in 1815. |
| Milić Drinčić | 1778–1815 | vojvoda of Crnagora knežina (1811) buljubaša of Crnagora knežina (1804) | A captain under Milan Obrenović in the early years. One of the main commanders in the Rudnik nahija. Nearest circle of Miloš Obrenović in 1815. |
| Ilija Petrović-Strelja | 17XX–1825 | vojvoda | |
| Jovan Petrović-Kursula | 1768–1813 | vojvoda | Regarded especially heroic, duelist. |
| Kapetan-Radič Petrović | 1738–1816 | vojvoda kapetan | Free Corps veteran. Exiled. |
| Atanasije-Tanasko Rajić | 1754–1815 | vojvoda barjaktar under Karađorđe (1804) | Karađorđe's friend, Free Corps veteran. |
| Čolak-Anta Simeonović | 1777–1853 | vojvoda of Kruševac (1811) | From Kosovo. Active in all major battles. |
| Miloš Stojićević-Pocerac | 1776–1811 | vojvoda of Pocerina (1806) bimbaša under Jakov Nenadović (1804) | Distinguished in battles by the Drina. |
| Nikola Grbović | c. 1760–1806 | obor-knez of Kolubara (Valjevska) knežina | Mustafa Pasha's militia veteran. Survived slaughter. Father of Radovan and Milovan. |

== Serbian captains ==
| Name | Image | Lifespan | Active | Rank | Notes |
|---|---|---|---|---|---|
| Jovan Jakovljević | | 17XX–18XX | 1804– | vojvoda of Levač | |
| Ilija Čarapić | | 1792–1844 | 1810–17 | vojvoda | Grocka nahija. |
| Tanasije Čarapić | | 1770–1810 | 1804–10 | vojvoda | Grocka nahija. |
| Kara-Marko Vasić | | 17XX–18XX | 1804–13 | vojvoda | Sokol nahija |
| Todor Vojinović | | 1760–1813 | 1804–13 | vojvoda under Anta Bogićević buljubaša of right shore of Jadar (1804–) | |
| Milovan Grbović | | 17XX–18XX | 1804–08 | vojvoda | Active in the Valjevo nahija, Radovan's brother. |
| Radovan Grbović | | 1760–1832 | 1804–13 | vojvoda of Valjevska Kolubara (1811) | Active in the Valjevo nahija, Milovan's brother. |
| Stevan Grbović | | 17XX–18XX | 18XX | vojvoda | Valjevo nahija |
| Luka Grbović | | 17XX–18XX | 18XX | vojvoda | Valjevo nahija |
| Đuka Filipović | | 1765–after 1817 | 1804–15 | vojvoda | |
| Joksim Karamarković | | c. 1779–1813 | 1804–1813 | vojvoda | |
| Nikola Karamarković | | 1776-1815 | 1804-1813 and 1815 | vojvoda | |
| Marko Katić | | 1780–1810 | 1804–1810 | vojvoda of Turija/Kosmaj (1806–10) | From Belgrade nahiya, brother of Janko. Served under Nenadović in the Bosnian campaign. Assassinated on orders of Miloje Trnavac. |
| Nikola Katić | | c. 1785– after 1815 | fl. 1806–1815 | vojvoda (II.) of Turija/Kosmaj (1810–) | From Belgrade nahiya, brother of Janko and Marko. |
| Stevan Katić | | c. 1785-1813 | fl. 1810-1813 | vojvoda | |
| Milić Kedić | | 1775–1809 | 1804–09 | vojvoda of Podgorje (1806?) knez of Podgorje (1804) | Valjevo nahija, fought under the command of the Nenadović. |
| Momir of Lučica | | 17XX–18XX | 1804–13 | vojvoda of Morava knežina knez | |
| Pavle-Paulj Matejić | | 1770–1816 | 1804–13 | vojvoda (II. class) of Mlavska knežina (1811) buljubaša under Petar Dobrnjac | Požarevac nahija. |
| Jovan Stevanović-Porečki | | 1777–1817 | 1804–13 | vojvoda (II. class) of Poreč (1811) bimbaša under Milenko | Merchant by trade, obor-knez during Mustafa Pasha. |
| Ivo Momirović | | 17XX–18XX | fl. 1811–13 | vojvoda (II. class) in Požarevac nahija (1811) | |
| Živko Šljivić | | 17XX–18XX | fl. 1811 | vojvoda (II. class) in Požarevac nahija (1811) | |
| Tomo Jovanović | | 17XX–18XX | fl. 1811 | vojvoda (II. class) in Požarevac nahija (1811) | |
| Ostoja Spuž | | 1765–1814 | 1804–13 | vojvoda knez | From Montenegro, ancestor of intellectual Slobodan Jovanović. |
| Ilija Stošić | | 17XX–1819 | 1804–13 | vojvoda (II. class) of Homolje (1811) buljubaša in Homolje (1804) | Active on the eastern front. |
| Milutin Petrović-Era | | 1791–1861 | fl. 1813 | vojvoda | Krajina nahija |
| Maksim Krstić | | c. 1780–1844 | 1804-1813 | vojvoda | |
| Blagoje Marinković | | 17XX–18XX | 18XX | vojvoda | |
| Raka Levajac | | 1777–1833 | 1804–13 | vojvoda | |
| Aksentije Miladinović | | 1760–1820 | 1804–15 | vojvoda knez | diplomat |
| Jevrem Nenadović | | 1793–1867 | fl. 1811–13 | vojvoda | Tamnava |
| Mihailo Radović | | 1759–1822 | 1804–17 | vojvoda of Zlatibor (1808) knez of Zlatibor (1805) | Farmer and shepherd by trade. |
| Dušan-Đuša Vulićević | | 1771–1828 | 1804–05 | vojvoda obor-knez | Smederevo nahija. |
| Vujica Vulićević | | 1773–1828 | 1804–17 | vojvoda obor-knez | Smederevo nahija. |
| Vule Ilić-Kolarac | | 1766–1834 | 1804–15 | komandant of the Smederevo fort | Former hajduk under Stanoje Glavaš. |
| Toma Vučić Perišić | | 1788–1859 | 1804–17 | vojvoda | Cousin of Melentije Pavlović. |
| Antonije Ristić-Pljakić | | c. 1780–1832 | 1804–1813 | vojvoda (1813) | Karađorđe's son-in-law. Karanovac nahija. |
| Milosav Zdravković-Resavac | | 1787–1854 | 1804–17 | knez of Resava (1809) | Son of Milija Zdravković. |
| Pavle Cukić | | 1778–1817 | 1804–17 | vojvoda of Lepenička knežina (–1812) | |
| Antonije-Anta Bogićević | | 1758–1813 | 1804–13 | vojvoda of Podrinje (1807–?) vojvoda of Jadar | Stationed in Loznica. |
| Cincar-Marko Kostić | | 1777–1822 | 1804–15 | vojvoda of Soko nahija (1812–13) buljubaša of a Šabac bećari unit (1806) | From Ohrid, cousin of Cincar-Janko. Participated in the second uprising as vojvoda of Šabačka Posavina. |
| Cincar-Janko Popović | | 1779–1833 | 1804–13 | vojvoda (1809) | From Ohrid, cousin of Cincar-Marko. Exiled in Russia. |
| Petar Đorđević-Džoda | | 17XX-18XX | 1804–13 | vojvoda of Vražogrnac (1811–13) komandant of Vražogrnac trench (1807–11) bimbaša under Hajduk-Veljko | Former hajduk. |
| Petar Đukić | | 17XX-1813 | fl. 1812–13 | vojvoda in Kruševac župa (1812–13) | |
| Ivan Knežević-Ivo Semberac | | 1760–1840 | 1806–13 | vojvoda of Bosnian refugees (1809–13) | From Bosnia, attached to Luka Lazarević. |
| Petar Nikolajević-Moler | | 1775–1816 | 1804–16 | vojvoda | Prime Minister (1815–16) |
| Milutin Ilić-Gučanin | | 1739–1814 | 1804–13 | vojvoda in Dragačevo (1811) | Archpriest. |
| Milisav Đorđević | | 17XX–1832 | 1804–13 | vojvoda in Crna Reka (1811) | knez in Ottoman period, cooper by trade. |
| Boža Radojević | | 17XX–18XX | 18XX | vojvoda | |
| Petronije Šišo | | 1770–1813 | 1804–1813 | vojvoda | Fell at Ravnje in August 1813 |
| Miloš Saranovac | | 17XX–18XX | 18XX | vojvoda | |
| Miloje Petrović-Trnavac | | 1760–1810 | fl. 1809–10 | Rival of Dobrnjac, executed by Pop-Luka. | |
| Pavle Popović | | 1750–1816 | 18XX | Member of Governing Council vojvoda | knez of Vranić, friend of Aganlija. |
| Zdravko | | 17XX–18XX | ? | vojvoda in Kruševac | |
| Kara-Pavle Simeunović | | 17XX–1815 | 1804–15 | vojvoda | Active in the Raška campaign, fell at Ljubić. |
| Petar Kara | | 17XX–18XX | 1804 | vojvoda (II. class) | From Donja Trešnjevica, former hajduk, fell at Jagodina (1804). |
| Aleksa Popović | | 17XX–18XX | 1804 | komandant | From Subjel. |
| Dimitrije Parezan | | 1780–1813 | 1804–1813 | vojvoda (II. class) (soldier) under Karađorđe | |
| Đorđe Milovanović-Guzonja | | 1765–1817 | 1804–1813 | komandant of Belgrade city vojvoda (II. class) | |
| Jovica Milovanović | | 17XX–18XX | 18XX | komandant of Belgrade city vojvoda (II. class) | |
| Milisav Petrović | | 17XX–18XX | 1806– | komandant of 1st Belgrade Foundry vojvoda (II. class) | cannon engineer. |
| Tomo Milinović-Morinjanin | | 1770–1846 | 1809–13 | komandant of 2nd Belgrade Foundry vojvoda (II. class) | Karađorđe's advisor and artillery specialist. |
| Đorđe Čarapić | | 1773–1826 | 18XX | podvojvoda under Lazar Mutap | |
| Ilija Ugričić Trebinjski-Novokršteni | | 1766–1813 | 1806–09 | Police-chief (policajmajstor) kapetan | Russian cavalry captain that joined the uprising. Deported to Siberia on accusations by Rodofinikin. |
| Uzun-Mirko Apostolović | | 1782–1868 | 1804–15 | bimbaša | |
| Đurica Stočić-Đura | | 17XX–18XX | 1804– | buljubaša under Stevan Sinđelić; Council knez of Ćuprija nahija | Militia veteran, merchant by trade. Sinđelić's associate. |
| Sima Milosavljević-Amidža-Paštrmac | | 1776–1836 | 1804–17 | barjaktar under Antonije Ristić-Pljakić (1813) | Participated in Hadži-Prodan's rebellion and became barjaktar and buljubaša of Miloš Obrenović in the second uprising, Miloš's state secretary. |
| Toša Đorđević | | c. 1790–1850 | 1804–17 | bimbaša of Zaglavak (1811–) buljubaša of Zaglavak (1807–11) | Former hajduk, brother of Golub Đorđević. |
| Đorđe Obradović-Ćurčija | | 17XX–1804 | 1804 | | Hajduk harambaša. |
| Bakal-Milosav | | 1770–1823 | 1804–13 | kapetan | Obrenović's |
| Petar Erić | | 17XX–18XX | 18XX | kapetan | |
| Giorgakis Olympios | | 1772–1821 | 1804–06 | kapetan | Greek volunteer, later Greek Revolutionary. Married Hajduk-Veljko's widow Čučuk Stana. |
| Jovica Milutinović | | 1773–1846 | 1804–13 | kapetan under the Nenadović | Valjevo nahija. |
| Ranko Matejić | | 17XX–18XX | 18XX | kapetan | |
| Marko R. Lazarević | | 17XX–1844 | 18XX | kapetan | |
| Marko Filipović | | 1782–after 1842 | 1804–15 | kapetan | Karađorđe's brother-in-law. |
| Konda Bimbaša | | 17XX–1807 | 1806–07 | bimbaša | Revolutionary bimbaša, former krdžalija. |
| Petar Jokić-Topolac | | c. 1779–1852 | 1804–13 | buljubaša under Karađorđe | |
| Dragan Papazoglu-Papazoglija | | 17XX–18XX | fl. 1804–1807 | bimbaša | former krdžalija |
| Milovan Resavac | | 17XX–18XX | fl. 1804– | bimbaša | From Radošin in Resava, comrade of Sinđelić. |
| Vuča Žikić-Žika | | 17XX–1808 | 1804–08 | ekzercir-majstor kapetan | Shepherd, Free Corps veteran, built Deligrad. |
| Jovan Gligorijević-Zeka Buljubaša | | 1785–1813 | 1804–13 | buljubaša | Commander of Goli Sinovi četa. Fell at Ravnje. |
| Todor Bojinović | | 1750s–1813 | 1804–09, 1813 | buljubaša under Ćurčija (soldier) under Anta Bogićević (1807–09) | Free Corps veteran, captured and hanged. |
| Mina Bimbaša | | 17XX–18XX | 1804 | bimbaša | |
| Ignatije Bjelić | | 17XX–18XX | 18XX | kapetan under Stojan Čupić | |
| Ilija Srdanović-Srdan | | 1770–1836 | 1804–15 | kapetan | |
| Dragić Petrović | | 17XX–1817 | fl. 1813–15 | kapetan | From Belgrade nahiya, executed by Marashli Ali Pasha. |
| Petko Vasiljević | | 1780–1809 | 1804–09 | bimbaša | |
| Raka Tešić | | 1773–1823 | 1804–17 | buljubaša (1815) knez | |
| Rada Radosavljević | | 17XX–18XX | 1804–15 | buljubaša in Tamnava | |
| Stojan Abraš | | 1780–1813 | 1813 | buljubaša and bimbaša | Former hajduk, Hajduk-Veljko's blood brother. |
| Periša Savić | | d. 1817 | 1807–15 | buljubaša | From Miokovci, knez of Karadak knežina (1816–17) |
| Marko Todorović | | 17XX–18XX | 18XX | knez | |
| Kosta Ignjatijević | | 17XX–18XX | 18XX | kapetan of Belgrade varoš police | From Austria. |
| Kraga Andrejević-Patrijaršanin | | 17XX–18XX | 1804–13 | kapetan of Belgrade varoš police | From Prizren, arms smuggler. |
| Gaja Dabić | | 17XX–18XX | 18XX | kapetan | |
| Živko Dabić | | 1778–1807 | 1804–07 | (commander) momak under Jakov Nenadović | |
| Sava Dedobarac | | 17XX–1807 | 1804–07 | buljubaša of bećari under Ilija Strelja | |
| Milutin Savić-Garašanin | | 1762–1842 | 1804–15 | (captain) | Free Corps corporal, former hajduk. |
| Jovan Simić Bobovac | | 1775–1832 | 1804–17 | buljubaša under Milić Kedić (1804–09) knez of Bobovac's knežina (1809) | Former buljubaša under Ilija Birčanin. |
| Milisav Čamdžija | | c. 1785–1815 | 1804–15 | kapetan under Sima Marković | Sima Marković's entourage. Heroic, had ten wounds. |
| Jovan Mitrović-Demir | | 1762–1852 | 1804–15 | buljubaša of Ponikve trench kapetan (1811) | From Herzegovina. |
| Vreta Kolarac | | 17XX–18XX | 1804–13 | buljubaša | From Macedonia, Vule Ilić's father-in-law. |
| Đorđe Zagla | | 17XX–18XX | 1804–13 | buljubaša under Vujica buljubaša under Vule Kolarac | From Macedonia. |
| Živan Petrović | | 17XX–18XX | 1804–13 | buljubaša | Hajduk, Free Corps veteran. Participated at Valjevo (1804). |
| Sima Katić-Prekodrinac | | 1783–1832 | 1804–15 | buljubaša (1805), bimbaša (1807) under Stojan Čupić | From Bosnia, active in Mačva and Podrinje. |
| Mijailo Nedić | | 1774–1807 | 1804–1807 | buljubaša | Joined to avenge his hajduk brothers Gligorije and Damnjan. |
| Jova Barjaktar | | ? | ? | barjaktar under Dimitrije Kujundžija | Son of Petar Sarajlija. |
| Veljko | | ? | 1805–? | under Ilija Barjaktarović | knez from Paraćin. |
| Šunda | | ? | 1805–? | buljubaša under Ilija Barjaktarović | |
| Laza | | ? | 1804–? | buljubaša in Vračar | From Vračar. |
| Radoje Marinković | | ? | 1804–? | buljubaša in Kosmaj | From Kosmaj. |
| Juriša Mihailović | | ? | 1804–? | kapetan in Valjevska Tamnava | Merchant, Valjevo nahija representative at Ostružnica, representative at the Zemun Meeting, signed April 1805 petition to the Sultan. |
| Nikola Smiljanić | | 1760–1815 | 1804–15 | | Archpriest, led 50–200 men based in Kitog. Poisoned by Marko Štitarac on Miloš Obrenović's order. |

- Among instructors (egzercir-majstori) in the Belgrade nahija were Austrian captains Vuča Žikić (d. 1808), Mijailo Đurković from Baja, Kosta Gligorijević, Mihailo Kostić from Karlovac, Zrnić from Glina, Proka Slavonac from Pakrac, Jevta Sremac from Srem, Dimitrije Simonović from Srem, Austrian lieutenant Đorđe Simić from Sremčica, kapelmajstor Aksentije Dobošar, adjutant Jakov Popović-Jakšić Pancirlija (1774–1848) from Ugrinovci.
- Among police chiefs/commissaries (policaj-kvartalmajstori) in Belgrade were Jefta Krstić from "Austria", Petar Tomić from "Austria", Jovica Petrović, a local knez, all subordinate policaj-majstor Ilija Trebinjski (fl. 1808–09); in Šabac nahija the scribe Lazar Teodorović (1771–1846) was appointed policaj-kvartalmajstor by komandant Luka Lazarević in September 1808.

== Serbian soldiers ==
| Name | Image | Lifespan | Active | Rank | Notes |
|---|---|---|---|---|---|
| Sekula Gavrilović | | 17XX–18XX | 18XX | barjaktar of Karađorđe | From Miokus. |
| Nikola Nidžović | | 17XX–18XX | 18XX | barjaktar in Kolubara | From Progoreoci in Kolubara. |
| Teodosije Marićević | | 1760–1807 | 1804–07 | (soldier) knez | Merchant by trade, came into conflict with Karađorđe. |
| Vasilije Popović | | c. 1775–1832 | 1804–15 | (soldier) | secret service |
| Cvetko Rajović | | 1793–1873 | 1811–13 | soldier (regular battalion) | Later Prime Minister, 1859–60 |
| Aćim Doljanac | | 17XX–18XX | 1804–? | soldier | From Ostružnica, Karađorđe's associate, member of Pavle Popović's četa. |
| Serdar Sima | | 17XX–18XX | 1804–? | soldier under Karađorđe | From Darosava in Kolubara, fell at Batočina. |
| Mileta Radojković | | 1778–1852 | 1804–1815 | (soldier) | knez of Jagodina (1815). |
| Milivoje Tadić | | 17XX–18XX | 1804–15 | soldier under Nenadović and Milić Kedić | elevated to vojvoda in 1815. |
| Ćira Rošavi | | 17XX–18XX | 18XX | | |
| Mihailo Ružičić | | 17XX–18XX | 18XX | | |
| Ilija Vukomanović | | 1755–1825 | 1815 | — | From Levač, built Belica trench near Jagodina. |
| Petar Vukomanović | | 17XX–1804 | 1804 | — | obor-knez, from Levač. |
| Marko Štitarac | | 17XX–18XX | 18XX | | |
| Obrad Stanojević | | 1750-18XX | 1804–1813 | | |
| Stevan-Steva Stevanović | | 17XX–18XX | 18XX | | |
| Stanoje Rosić | | 17XX–18XX | fl. 1804 | buljubaša under Sinđelić | Stationed in Ćuprija. |
| Marko Krstić | | 17XX–18XX | 18XX | | |
| Dimitrije Kujundžić | | 17XX–18XX | 18XX | | |
| Kosta Kujundžić | | 17XX–18XX | 18XX | | |
| Milosav Lapovac | | 17XX–18XX | 18XX | | |
| Mica Brka (Krajević) | | 17XX–1813 | 1804–13 | (soldier) | From Mavrovo in Macedonia, son of Miloš Krajević (Miloš Brka), a Serbian Free Corps lieutenant and Austrian officer that fell fighting the French. Brka fought heroically and fell at the side of Hajduk-Veljko in 1813. Nothing more is known about him. |
| Dimitrije Đorđević-Jagodinac | | c. 1782–1837 | 1804–15 | momak under Milan Obrenović | From Macedonia, came with the kırcalı. |
| Đura Brničanin | | 17XX–18XX | 18XX | | |
| Miloje Todorović | | 17XX–18XX | 1804 | | |
| Miloje | | 17XX–18XX | fl. 1806 | (soldier) | knez from Crnče, accompanied the takeover of Kruševac. |
| Jovan Tomić Belov | | 17XX–1813 | 1804–13 | (soldier) | Distinguished at Mišar. |
| Kara-Petar Trešnjevičanin | | 1768–1804 | 1804 | | |
| Marjan Zdravković-Resavac | | 17XX–18XX | 1804 | | |
| Dobrosav Zdravković-Resavac | | 17XX–18XX | 18XX | | |
| Jovan Jančić-Sarajlija | | 17XX–1809 | 1806–09 | | organizer in Bosnia |
| Milisav Drobnjak | | 1762–1822 | 1804–15 | (soldier) | Duelist. |
| Đorđe Šagić | | 1795–1873 | 1813 | (soldier) | |
| Miloje Popović-Đak | | c. 1769–1825 | 1804–13 | (soldier) under Vujica | Former priest, secretary of Vujica. |
| Mijailo Gluvac | | 1758–1810 | 1804–10 | (soldier) under Pop-Luka | Duelist. |
| Panta Damnjanović | | c. 1780–1804 | 1804 | Hajduk harambaša | Fell at Čokešina. |
| Damnjan Kotešanin | | c. 1780–1804 | 1804 | Hajduk harambaša | Fell at Čokešina. |
| Damnjan Nedić | | 1772–1804 | 1804 | Hajduk harambaša | Fell at Čokešina. |
| Gligorije Nedić | | 1769–1804 | 1804 | Hajduk harambaša | Fell at Čokešina. |
| Stojko Batinić | | fl. 1804 | fl. 1804 | (soldier) | From Azanje, rode horseback, participated at Topčider. |
| Stojko Krivokuća | | 17XX–1804 | 1804 | (soldier) | From Smederevo nahiya, active in Resava. |
| Stojan Džoda | | fl. 1806 | fl. 1806 | (soldier) | Sent by Dobrnjac to Aleksinac to ask ayan Arcin (Ardžin) to surrender. |
| Aleksa Dukić | | 17XX–18XX | 18XX | | |
| Arsenije Raonić | | 17XX–18XX | 1804 | soldier under Nenadović | Valjevo nahija. |
| Goca Đorđević | | 17XX–18XX | 18XX | | |
| Hrista Đorđević | | 17XX–18XX | 18XX | | |
| Ivan Đorđević | | 17XX–18XX | 18XX | | |
| Stevan Filipović | | 1780-after 1842 | 1804–15 | | |
| Stojan Karadžić | | 17XX–18XX | 18XX | | |
| Vasilije Karadžić-Šujo | | 1785–1858 | 1804–15 | | |
| Radojko Kojadinović | | 1745–1835 | 1804–1813 | | |
| Živko Konstantinović Paraćinac | | c. 1770–1809 | 1804–09 | ? | Executed. |
| Nikola Mandrda | | 1780–c. 1860 | 1804–15 | | Former hajduk serdar. |
| Jovan Mićić | | 17XX–1844 | fl. 1813 | | |
| Živko Mihailović | | 1770–1835 | 1804–13 | | |
| Joksa Milosavljević | | 1781–1837 | 1804–15 | | |
| Gligorije Mladenović-Gliša | | 17XX–18XX | 1804– | | |
| Gaja Pantelić Vodeničarević | | 1774–1849 | 1804–1813 | | Karađorđe's childhood friend and brother-in-law. |
| Cvetko Popović-Vranovački | | 1775–1809 | 1804–1809 | | |
| Vićentije Petrović | | 1760–1822 | 1804–15 | vojvoda (II.) in Grocka | From Belgrade nahiya. |
| Mojsilo Ranitović | | 17XX–18XX | 1804– | | Petar Kara's comrade. |
| Blagoje Zemunac | | 1770–1815 | 1804–15 | tobdžija | Smuggled ammunition into Serbia from Zemun, fell at Ljubić. |
| Milovan Lomić | | 1793–1854 | ? | | From Dragolj, Kačer knežina; Arsenije Loma's nephew. |
| Nikola | | 17XX–18XX | ? | buljubaša of Arsenije Loma | From Dragolj, Kačer knežina; Arsenije Loma's comrade. |
| Ilija Dambuba | | 17XX–18XX | ? | barjaktar of Arsenije Loma | From Bosuta, Kačer knežina; Arsenije Loma's comrade. |
| Periša Rakić | | 17XX–18XX | ? | ? | From Rudnik, Kačer knežina; starešina in Kačer. |
| Marko Rakić | | 17XX–18XX | ? | kapetan of Kačer knežina | From Rudnik, Kačer knežina. |
| Mijat | | 17XX–18XX | ? | buljubaša of Kačer knežina | From Rudnik, Kačer knežina; knez. |
| Milisav | | 17XX–18XX | ? | buljubaša of Kačer knežina | From Kamenica, Kačer knežina. |
| Rista | | 17XX–18XX | ? | arambaša of Kačer knežina | From Kamenica, Kačer knežina. |

== Serbian politicians, diplomats, educators and lawyers ==
| Name | Image | Lifespan | Occupation | Notes |
|---|---|---|---|---|
| Matija Nenadović | | 1777–1854 | politician (predsednik) vojvoda | Archpriest, politician and diplomat. Prime Minister (1805–07) |
| Vesa Velimirović | | 17XX–18XX | politician (council member) | From Valjevo nahija. |
| Jovan Protić | | 17XX–18XX | politician (council member) diplomat | From Požarevac nahija. Deputy (poslanik) in Wallachia (1804–05). |
| Koja Ivanović | | 17XX–18XX | politician (council member) | From Šabac nahija. |
| Velisav Stanojlović | | 17XX–18XX | politician (council member) | From Jagodina nahija. |
| Avram Lukić | | 17XX–18XX | politician (council member) | From Čačak nahija. |
| Vasa Jovanović Petroman | | 17XX–18XX | politician (council member) | From Užice nahija. |
| Janko Đurđević | | c. 1770–1828 | Member of Governing Council; Member of Judicial Court | lawyer, council member in Smederevo nahija (1805–13). |
| Stojan Pavlović | | 17XX–18XX | Member of Governing Council; Member of Judicial Court | From Rudnik nahija. |
| Janićije Đurić | | 1779–1850 | politician (council member) | Karađorđe's secretary, exiled, returned in 1830. |
| Koca Marković | | 1762–1832 | politician | Merchant by trade. |
| Ilija Marković | | c. 1762–1837 | President of Judicial Court diplomat knez | From Šabac nahija. |
| Teodor Filipović-Boža Grujević | | 1778–1807 | secretary (council) | From "Austria", lawyer |
| Jovan Savić-Ivan Jugović | | 1772–1813 | secretary (council) professor diplomat | Founder of the Velika škola. |
| Dositej Obradović | | 1739–1811 | Minister of Education (1807–11) | Important figure in the renaissance. |
| Petar Ičko | | 1755–1808 | diplomat | Greek influential merchant that became a Serbian rebel representative and diplomat. |
| Petar Novaković-Čardaklija | | 1744–1810 | diplomat | Austrian veteran, envoy to Russia (1804), Constantinople (1805), and Russian military command (1806). Pro-Russian camp. Brother of Jovan. |
| Jovan Čardaklija | | 17XX–18XX | diplomat | Austrian oberstleutnant. Brother of Petar. |
| Jeremija Gagić | | 1783–1859 | diplomat | merchant, secretary, later Russian envoy in Ragusa. |
| Stevan Živković-Telemak | | 1780–1831 | diplomat | Deputy (poslanik) in the delegation to Russia (1804–05). |
| Stevan Krstić Živković | | 17XX–1835 | diplomat | merchant, diplomatic envoy, married Aganlija's widow. |
| Miljko Radonjić | | 1770–1836 | Minister of Foreign Affairs (1811–12) diplomat professor at Great School | From Rudnik nahija, diplomatic envoy |
| Lazar Vojnović | | 17XX–18XX | professor at Great School | |
| Miša Popović | | 17XX–18XX | professor at Great School | |
| Gliša Živanović | | 17XX–18XX | professor at Great School | |
| Jovan Mijoković | | 17XX–18XX | professor at Great School | |
| Vićentije Rakić | | 1750–1818 | founder and professor of Theological College (1810–13) professor at Great School (1808–10) | |
| Sima Milutinović Sarajlija | | 1791–1847 | professor at Great School | Council scribe. |
| Naum Krnar | | 17XX–1815 | secretary | Merchant by trade, Karađorđe's secretary. |
| Mihailo Grujović | | 1780–1845 | secretary | From "Austria", Brother of Teodor Filipović. |
| Jevta Savić Čotrić | | 1767-1821 | diplomat | diplomat |
| Milija Zdravković | | 17XX–18XX | council member in Ćuprija | |
| Lazar Arsenijević-Batalaka | | 1793-1869 | teacher | active among the exiled revolutionaries, wrote history on the uprisings. |
| Nikola Nikolajević | | 1780–after 1842 | teacher | |
| Nikola Deli-Georgijević | | 17XX–18XX | President of Belgrade Magistrate | From Syrmia. |
| Antonije-Anta Protić | | 1787–1854 | secretary | secretary of Vujica (1807) |

== Clergy ==
| Name | Image | Lifespan | Active | Occupation | Notes |
|---|---|---|---|---|---|
Bishops
| Leontius | | c. 1770–1823 | 1804–13 | Metropolitan of Belgrade (1801–13) | intermediary between rebels and the Porte |
| Antim Zepos | | 1762–fl. 1814 | 1804–13 | Metropolitan of Užice-Valjevo | supported the rebels. |
| Petar I Petrović-Njegoš | | 1748–1830 | 1804–17 | Metropolitan (or "Prince-Bishop") of Montenegro | assisted Karađorđe with volunteers. |
Archimandrites, archpriests and hegumen
| Hadži-Melentije Stevanović | | 1766–1824 | 1804–13 | archimandrite | Armed priest, acting bishop. |
| Arsenije Gagović | | c. 1750–1817 | 1804–15 | archimandrite | cleric and diplomat |
| Gligorije Radojičić | | 17XX–18XX | ? | archimandrite of Blagoveštenje Rudničko | archimandrite of Blagoveštenje Rudničko. |
| Radisav Milošević | | 17XX–18XX | ? | archimandrite of Vujan | archimandrite of Vujan, from Prislonica in Rudnička Morava knežina. |
| Pavle Lazarević | | 17XX–1844 | 18XX | archpriest | archpriest |
| Radojica Žujović | | 17XX–18XX | ? | archpriest of Rudnik | From Rudnik, Kačer knežina; archpriest (prota) of Rudnik. |
| Aleksa Lazarević | | 17XX–18XX | ? | archpriest of Šopić | From Šopić. Deputy (poslanik) in the delegation to Russia (1804–05). |
| Atanasije Antonijević | | 1734–1804 | 1804 | protojerej of Bukovica | 1803 conspirator. Armed priest, participated at Drlupa. |
| Pajsije Ristović | | 1790–1814 | 1804–1813 | hegumen of Trnava | Armed priest in the First Uprising, from Trnava in Čačanska Morava–Podibar knežina. Supported Hadži-Prodan's rebellion. Proclaimed New Martyr. |
| Avakum Petrović | | 17XX–18XX | ? | hegumen of Bogovađa | hegumen of Bogovađa. |
| Melentije Pavlović | | 1776–1833 | 1815 | hegumen of Vraćevšnica | Cousin of Toma Vučić Perišić, Armed priest in Second Uprising, later Metropolitan of Belgrade (1831–33) |
| Hadži-Atanasije Radovanović | | 1771–1826 | – | hegumen of Nikolje | From Rudnik nahiya. Baptized the children of Miloš Obrenović. |
| Vidak | | 17XX–18XX | ? | hegumen of Vaznesenje Ovčarsko | Armed priest. |
| Filimon | | 17XX–18XX | ? | hegumen of the Holy Trinity | Armed priest, from Dučalovići in Dragačevo knežina. |
| Neofit | | 17XX–18XX | ? | hegumen of Nikolje | Armed priest, from Dučalovići in Dragačevo knežina. |
Priests and monks
| Melentije Simeonović Nikšić | | 1780–1816 | 1804–13 | hieromonk | Armed priest in First Uprising, diplomatic envoy (1815), vladika of Užice-Valjevo (1816). |
| Samuilo Jakovljević | | 1760–1825 | 1804–13 | hieromonk of Studenica | Armed priest in First Uprising. Died in Ottoman prison. |
| Filip Petrović | | 17XX–18XX | ? | vojvoda priest | Armed priest, from Trnava in Čačanska Morava–Podibar knežina. Promoted to vojvoda of Studenica. |
| Nikola Kostić | | 1769–1818 | ? | knez priest | Armed priest, from Mrsać in Čačanska Morava–Podibar knežina. Served as knez in the Požega nahija. |
| Staniša | | 17XX–18XX | 1804– | (soldier) under Sinđelić priest | Armed priest, distinguished soldier and advisor of Sinđelić. |
| Milovan Protić | | 17XX–18XX | ? | priest | Armed priest, son of archpriest and vojvoda Milutin Ilić, from Guča in Dragačevo knežina. |
| Avakum | | 1792–1814 | 1814 | monk in Trnava | From Bosnia, deacon of Moštanica, fled to Trnava and supported Hadži-Prodan's rebellion. Proclaimed New Martyr. |

- There were many armed priests and monks that participated in the uprising. Among lesser known were priest Savo from Moravci in Kačer knežina; priest Janko Vitomirović from Takovo in Brusnica/Takovo knežina; priest Mijailo from Ljutovnica in Brusnica/Takovo knežina, impaled during uprising; priests Petar Protić and Antonije Pejović-Protić from Cvetke in Rudnička Morava knežina; priest Spasoje Pavić from Katrga in Rudnička Morava knežina; priests Milić Vujović and Simo Seničanin, and monk Đorđe-Genadije Šuvak, from Trnava in Čačanska Morava–Podibar knežina; priest Radovan Popović from Ježevica in Čačanska Morava–Podibar knežina; priest Vićentije Miladinović from Lazac in Čačanska Morava–Podibar knežina; priests Jovan Savić-Knežević, Dimitrije Nedeljković-Janjić, David Milićević-Petković from Goračići in Dragačevo knežina; priest Pavle Nikolić (1738–1835) from Guča in Dragačevo knežina.

== Russian deputation ==
| Name | Image | Lifespan | Active | Occupation | Notes |
|---|---|---|---|---|---|
Military
| Ilija Ugričić Trebinjski-Novokršteni | | 1766–1813 | 1806–09 | Police-chief (policajmajstor) kapetan | Russian cavalry captain that joined the uprising. Deported to Siberia on accusations by Rodofinikin. |
| Ivan Ivanovich Isaev | | 1748–1810 | 1807–10 | Russian major-general | Arrived in June 1807 with 1,500 troops. Supported Serbian operations until 1809. |
| Joseph Cornelius O'Rourke | | 1772–1849 | 1809–10 | Russian cavalry general | Arrived in 1809, led a Russian regiment in battles in Serbia. |
| Cukatov | | 17XX–18XX | 1810 | Russian major | Arrived in 1810. |
Diplomatic
| Filippo Paulucci | | 1779–1849 | 1807 | Russian colonel | Arrived in June 1807 to ensure Serbian-Russian alliance. |
| Konstantin Rodofinikin | | 1760–1858 | 1809 | Russian diplomat | Interfered in Serbia's internal affairs and was recalled. Negative legacy. |
| Marko Ivelich | | 1740–1825 | 1811 | Russian general, diplomat in Montenegro and Serbia | Didn't accomplish much, owing to extenuating circumstances of the time |
| Stepan Sankovsky | | d. 1818 | 1805–07 | Russian diplomat in Montenegro | Russian commissioner at the Montenegrin court in 1805–07. |

== Ottoman ==
| Name | Lifespan | Occupation | Notes |
|---|---|---|---|
Vizier, Vali
| Hafiz Mustafa Agha | 1770–1805 | Vizier of Belgrade (April–August 1805) mutesellim in Niš | From Niš. Led campaign from the Sanjak of Niš. Mortally wounded at Ivankovac. |
| Muhasil Suleyman Agha | ?–1807 | Vizier of Belgrade (August 1804–April 1805); Vizier of Belgrade (September 1805–February 1807) | Former muhasil (Porte contact). |
| Agha Hasan Pasha | fl. 1804 | Vizier of Belgrade (1804–12 July 1804) | Held office during the Dahije, no power nor influence in the Pashalik. Replaced by Muhasil Suleyman Agha. |
| Bekir Pasha | fl. 1800–07 | Vizier of Bosnia (June 1802–January 1805) | Sent by the Porte to Belgrade in July–October 1804 to pacify the Pashalik. Approved assassination of Dahije leaders. |
| Seyid Mustafa Pasha Ismailpašić | fl. 1804–1806 | Vizier of Bosnia (January 1805–March 1806) | Ordered mobilization of all of Bosnia Eyalet at Podrinje in early 1805. Appointed Mustafa Pasha of Zvornik the general of Podrinje campaign. |
| Koca Hüsrev Mehmed Pasha | 1756–1855 | Vizier of Bosnia (April 1806–January 1808) | Sent 3,000 soldiers under Kulin-kapetan into Serbia on 25 June 1806. Sent 4,000 under Ali Pasha Vidajić and 1,800 under Ismail Pasha in early June 1807. |
| Ibrahim Hilmi Pasha | ? | Vizier of Bosnia (January 1808–March 1813) | Ordered by the Porte to destroy Serbia with Hurshid Pasha in 1810. |
| Darendeli Ali Pasha | ? | Vizier of Bosnia (March 1813–March 1815) | Mobilized 20,000 in September 1813. |
| Hurshid Pasha | fl. 1801–d. 1822 | Vali of Rumelia (1808–) | Joined campaign in 1809. Became Grand Vizier in 1812. |
Generals
| Mustafa Pasha of Zvornik | fl. 1804–1805 | mutessarif of the Sanjak of Zvornik | General of Podrinje campaign (1805). |
| Hadji Sali Bey | fl. 1804–1806 | bey in Srebrenica | Associate of the Nenadović family. Informed the Porte about Dahije abuse. Deputy of general Mustafa Pasha in the Podrinje campaign (1805). Fought at Bratačić, pursued back into Bosnia. |
| Sinan Pasha Sijerčić | fl. 1804–d. 1806 (KIA) | mutesellim in Goražde | Deputy of general Mustafa Pasha in the Podrinje campaign (1805). Fell at Mišar. |
| Mehmed Agha of Višegrad | fl. 1804–1805 | official in Višegrad | Deputy of general Mustafa Pasha in the Podrinje campaign (1805). |
| Memiš-aga Mačković | fl. 1804–1805 | Janissary commander in Sarajevo | Deputy of general Mustafa Pasha in the Podrinje campaign (1805). |
Captains
| Hasan Pasha of Banja Luka | fl. 1804–1805 | official in Banja Luka | Accompanied Podrinje campaign (1805). Captured at Mišar and exchanged. |
| Bayraktar Ali | fl. 1804–1805 | bayraktar (flag-bearer) | From Prusce. Accompanied Podrinje campaign (1805). |
| Suleyman Pasha of Klis | fl. 1804–1805 | mutesarrif of the Sanjak of Klis | Accompanied Podrinje campaign (1805). |
| Ibrahim Agha from Kobaš | fl. 1804–1805 | – | From Kobaš. Accompanied Podrinje campaign (1805). |
| Mahmud Agha from Jezero | fl. 1804–1805 | – | From Jezero near Jajce. Accompanied Podrinje campaign (1805). |
| Sulejman Pasha Skopljak | fl. 1804–d. 1818 | serasker of Ottoman Bosnian cavalry | From Uskoplje, Bosnia. Captured at Mišar and exchanged. Became Vizier of Belgrade (1813–1815), fought in the second uprising. |
| Sinan Pasha Sijerčić | fl. 1804–d. 1806 (KIA) | mutesellim in Goražde | Ottoman Bosnian army. Fell at Mišar. |
| Mehmed-beg Kulenović–Kulin-kapetan | 1776–1806 (KIA) | captain of Ostrovica Castle | Sent with 3,000 soldiers by Vizier Koca Hüsrev Mehmed Pasha into Serbia on 25 June 1806. Fell at Mišar. |
| Ali Pasha Vidajić | fl. 1803–d. 1810 (KIA) | (captain) in Sanjak of Zvornik | Ottoman Bosnian army. Nephew of Mehmed. Captured at Mišar and exchanged. Fell at Loznica. |
| Mehmed-kapetan Vidajić | fl. 1804–d. 1806 (KIA) | (captain) in Sanjak of Zvornik | Ottoman Bosnian army. Uncle of Ali. Fell at Mišar along with two of his sons. |
| Murad-beg Ibrahimpašić | fl. 1804–d. 1806 (KIA) | bey in Bihać | Ottoman Bosnian army. Fell at Mišar. |
| Hadji Agha Mišić | fl. 1804–d. 1806 (KIA) | – | From Soko. Fell at Mišar. |
| Ahmed-aga Agić | fl. 1804–d. 1806 (KIA) | – | From Soko. Fell at Mišar. |
| Ahmed-aga Zirić | fl. 1804–d. 1806 (KIA) | – | Fell at Mišar. |
| Omer-aga Kučaković | fl. 1804–d. 1806 (KIA) | deputy of captain Rustem Bey of Bihać | Fell at Mišar. |
| Sinan-beg Kukavica | fl. 1804–d. 1806 (KIA) | – | From Uskoplje. Fell at Mišar. |
| Dervish Malkoç | fl. 1804–d. 1806 (KIA) | – | From Uskoplje. Fell at Mišar. |
| Ibrahim Pasha | fl. 1804–1806 | kethüda (assistant) of Koca Hüsrev Mehmed Pasha | Captured at Mišar and exchanged. |
| Hasan Pasha of Srebrenica | fl. 1804–d. 1810 (KIA) | (commander) of Srebrenica | Captured at Mišar and exchanged. Fell at Loznica |
| Abd-aga Vidajić | fl. 1804–1806 | (commander) of Šabac Fort | From Bosnia. |
| Smail Agha of Banja | fl. 1805 | ? | Fought at Ivankovac. |
| Mehmed-aga Zgura | d. 1805 (KIA) | deli | Fell at Karanovac. |
| Ibrahim Pasha of Scutari | d. 1810 | Pasha of Scutari | Fought at Deligrad. |
| Şehit | ? | | Fought at Deligrad. |
| Ismail Pasha Sanul | ? | | Entered Serbia with Sali Bey in October 1807. |
| Hasan Pasha Duvnjak | fl. 1809 | – | From Duvno. Participated in the Ottoman counter-offensive in 1809 and pushed out Stojan Čupić from Posavina and retook Bijeljina. |
| Sunulah Pasha | fl. 1809 | official in Travnik | Participated in the Ottoman counter-offensive in 1809 and pursued Milan Obrenović into Soko. |
| Ibrahim Pasha | fl. 1809 | official in Srebrenica | Participated in the Ottoman counter-offensive in 1809 and with Ali Pasha Vidajić burnt down Lješnica. |
Yusuf Agha of Požarevac
Kara Hasan Pasha
| Ismail Bey | ? | | Mustered troops from Adrianople and Salonica that fought at Čegar. |
| Ahmed Pasha of Vranje | ? | | Mustered troops from Vranje that fought at Čegar. |
| Kara Fejza | ? | | Mustered troops from Leskovac that fought at Čegar. |
| Şaşit Pasha | ? | Pasha of Leskovac | Mustered troops from Leskovac that fought at Čegar. |
| Numan-beg Mahmudbegović | ? | bey | From Bosnia. Fought at Suvodol. |
| Ostroč-kapetan | d. 1806 (KIA) | (captain) | Ottoman Bosnian army. Fought Mišar. Pursued and killed after the battle by Cincar-Janko. |
| Hadži-Mosta | d. 1806 (KIA) | | Ottoman Bosnian army. Fought Mišar. Pursued and killed after the battle by Lazar Mutap. |
| Kapetan-paša Ferhatagić | fl. 1804–05 | Vizier of Novi Pazar | Sent reinforcements to Karanovac. |
| Bego Novljanin | fl. 1804–05 | Janissary agha delibaşı | From Bosnia. Dahije supporter. Killed Ranko Lazarević in Šabac in 1801. Commanded deli from Bosnia. Surrendered at Užice. |
| Omer-aga Nišlija | fl. 1804–05 | Janissary commander | From Niš. Sent to Užice by Hafiz Agha of Niš, or moved from Bosnia to Užice during the Dahije reign with Bego Novljanin. Dahije supporter. Commanded Janissaries of the Vidin Pashalik. Surrendered at Užice. |
| Ibrahim Agha | fl. 1788–1804 | (commander) of Ada Kaleh (–1806) | Uncle of Recep Agha. |
| Recep Agha | 1770–1814 | (commander) of Adakale (1806–14) | Nephew of Ibrahim Agha, commander of Ada Kaleh. Joined armed conflict in 1813. Executed in 1814. |

== Other ==
| Name | Image | Lifespan | Active | Occupation | Notes |
|---|---|---|---|---|---|
| Jovan Petrović Kovač | | 1772–1837 | 1804–13 | | Free Corps veteran. Blacksmith. |
| Nikola Milićević-Lunjevica | | 1767–1842 | 1804–15 | sponsor | Merchant, Obrenović's close associate, sponsor. |
| Jovan Dimitrijević Dobrača | | 17XX–1839 | — | merchant vojvoda (honorific) knez of Gruža | Merchant. |
| Miloš Urošević-Kavadarac | | 17XX–18XX | 1804– | merchant | From Kavadar in Kragujevac nahiya. Merchant in Zemun, arms smuggler. |
| Dimitrije Ratković | | 17XX–18XX | 1804– | merchant | Merchant in Zemun, arms smuggler. |
| Topal-Milutin | | 17XX–18XX | 1804– | merchant | Merchant in Zemun, arms smuggler. |
| Filip Višnjić | | 1767–1834 | 1809–15 | Gusle player | Performer of epic poetry, source for Vuk Karadžić's collection. |
| Tešan Podrugović | | c. 1775–1815 | 1804–15 | Gusle player | Performer of epic poetry, source for Vuk Karadžić's collection. |
| Old Rashko | | c. 1770–1822 | 1804–06 | Gusle player | Performer of epic poetry, source for Vuk Karadžić's collection. |
| Đuro Milutinović the Blind | | c. 1774–1844 | 1804–13 | Gusle player, messenger | Performer of epic poetry and a messenger of secret plans. |

== See also ==
- Timeline of the Serbian Revolution
- Serbian Army (revolutionary)
- Assemblies of the Serbian Revolution
- Serbian revolutionary organizations

== Sources ==
- Batalaka, Lazar Arsenijević (1898). Историја српског устанка, део први [History of the Serbian Uprising: Part One]. Vol. I. Izd. Batalakinoga fonda – via Google Books.
- Batalaka, Lazar Arsenijević (1899). Историја српског устанка, део други [History of the Serbian Uprising: Part Two]. Vol. II. Штампано у штампарији – via Google Books.
- Ðorđević, Tihomir R. (1929) [1918]. "Македонија и борба српскога народа за ослобођење". Македонија [Macedonia]. Belgrade: Издање Удружења Јужно-Србијанаца у Београду.
- Gavrilović, Andra (1904). Црте из историје ослобођења Србије. Belgrade: Нздање дворске књпжаре Мпте Стајпћа у Београду – via Archive.org.
- Milićević, Milan Đ. (1888). Поменик знаменитих људи у српског народа новијега доба [Memory Book]. Издање Чупићеве задужбине – via Archive.org.
- Milisavljević, Miloš (1954). "Устаничке биографије". In Perović, Radoslav (ed.). Прилози за историју првог српског устанка: необјављена грађа. Народна књига.
- Nenadović, Konstantin N. (1884). Живот и дела великог Ђорђа Петровића Кара-Ђорђа [Life and Deeds of Great Đorđe Petrović Kara-Đorđe]. Vol. II (1 ed.). Vienna: У Штампарији Јована Н. Вернаја – via Google Books.
- Nenadović, Konstantin N. (1903) [1883]. Живот и дела великог Ђорђа Петровића Кара-Ђорђа [Life and Deeds of Great Đorđe Petrović Kara-Đorđe]. Vol. I (2 ed.). Belgrade: Штампа Савића и Комп. – via Archive.org.
- Novaković, Stojan (1904). Устанак на дахије 1804 [Uprising against the Dahije]. Штампано у Државној штампарији – via Archive.org.
- Obradović, Stojan (1873). Живот и радња заслужних Срба из окружија шабачког и подринског у књажеству Србији у устанцима противу насиља турског од 1804. и 1815. године: у два одељка. Stefanović.
- Pavlović, Dragoljub M. (1990). "Учесници српских үстанака од 1804. до 1815. године из Рудничке и Пожешке нахије" [Participants aux insurrections serbes de 1804 et 1815 nés dans les nahies de Rudnik et de Požega] (PDF). Зборник радова Народног музеја у Чачку. XX: 115–131.
- Protić, Kosta (1893). "Ратни догађаји из првога српског устанка под Карађорђем Петровићем 1804—1813". Годишњица Николе Чупића. XIII. Државна штампарија.
- Protić, Kosta (1891). "Ратни догађаји из другог српског устанка, год. 1815". Годишњица Николе Чупића. XII. Државна штампарија: 1–104 – via Google Books.
