= Đorđe Zagla =

Serbian commander

- Ђорђе Загла
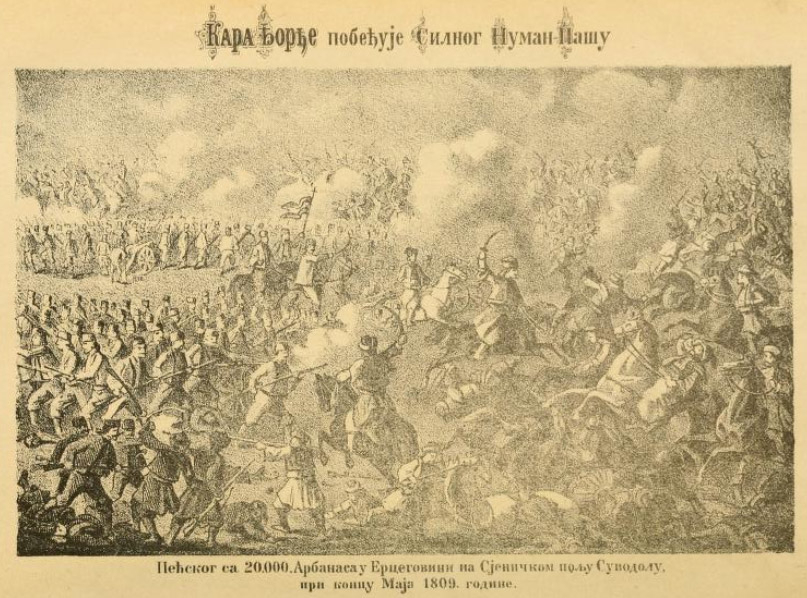
- Battle of Suvodol, where Zagla distinguished himself
- Born: Blace, Macedonia
- Died: 30 November 1847; Belgrade, Principality of Serbia
- Burial place: St. Mark's Church, Belgrade
- Military career
- Allegiance: Revolutionary Serbia
- Service years: 1804–1813
- Rank: buljubaša
- Units: Vujica, Vule Kolarac
- Commands: Smederevo
- Conflicts: First Serbian Uprising (1804–1813)

Đorđe Zagla (Serbian: Ђорђе Загла; died 1847) was a Serbian revolutionary commander active in the First Serbian Uprising (1804–1813), mostly around Smederevo.

Zagla was born in "Blace in Macedonia", and settled in Smederevo with his three brothers Dimitrije, Pavle and Todor in 1804 following the outbreak of the uprising against the Dahije. He quickly became a buljubaša (captain), the top one in Smederevo, under the command of Vujica Vulićević. When Smederevo was organized into a special administrative unit in Revolutionary Serbia, put under Vule Kolarac, Zagla continued as the top buljubaša under him.

Zagla proved heroic, distinguishing himself in many battles, with many wounds, especially at Suvodol (10 June 1809) where he harassed the "Turk" troops alongside his commander Vule Kolarac. He was wounded in the stomach but survived. Following the suppression of the uprising and return of Ottoman rule (1813), Zagla and his brothers moved to Sremska Mitrovica (Habsburg territory) where they traded, but he was unsuccessful. Upon the Second Serbian Uprising (1815) under Miloš Obrenović, Zagla returned to Serbia and lived in Belgrade where he was respected and received a state pension. He died on 30 November 1847 and was buried at St. Mark's Church, Belgrade.

Zagla was among several notable revolutionaries that hailed from Macedonia, other examples being Vuča Žikić, Cincar-Janko, Cincar-Marko, Dimitrije Đorđević-Jagodinac.

Serbian novelist Branislav Nušić (1864–1938) wrote Our Romeo and Juliet (Наш Ромео и Јулија) about the romance between Đorđe Zagla and a beautiful Turk concubine in Dorćol; they exchanged flowers with meanings via Zagla's dog to show their affection to each other. This was a real story, also noted by Marinko Paunović.

== See also ==
- List of Serbian Revolutionaries
- Timeline of the Serbian Revolution

== Sources ==
- Ðorđević, Tihomir R. (1929). Македонија. Belgrade: Издање Удружења Јужно-Србијанаца у Београду.
- Milićević, Milan Đ. (1888). Поменик знаменитих људи у српског народа новијега доба. Издање Чупићеве задужбине. pp. 169–170 – via Archive.org.
- Nenadović, Konstantin N. (1884). Живот и дела великог Ђорђа Петровића Кара-Ђорђа. Vol. II (1 ed.). Vienna: У Штампарији Јована Н. Вернаја – via Google Books.
