= Ilija Strelja =

Serbian revolutionary (c.1770–1825)

- Born: Ilija Petrović; 1770s Gradište, Ottoman Empire
- Died: 1825
- Military career
- Allegiance: Revolutionary Serbia
- Service years: 1804–1813
- Rank: buljubaša (1804), bimbaša (1806), vojvoda (1809)
- Nicknames: Ilija Strelja, Ilija Delija
- Unit: Leskovac volunteer unit
- Conflicts: First Serbian Uprising

Ilija Petrović (Serbian Cyrillic: Илија Петровић; d. 1825), known as Ilija Strelja (Илија Стреља) and Ilija Delija (Илија Делија), was a Serb revolutionary, a commander (bimbaša) active in the First Serbian Uprising, leading a unit of volunteers. He distinguished himself in the Battle of Deligrad (1806) and is enumerated in epic poetry.

== Life ==
Strelja was born in the village of Gradište near Vlasotince, at the time part of the nahiya of Leskovac. Turks stole his property in Kozare and sought to kill him, but he fled to the Sanjak of Smederevo. After the rebel army took Aleksinac and Strelja distinguished himself in battles (such as Deligrad in 1806), he became the commander of the bećari ("bachelors", volunteers) of the Leskovac nahiya under the command of captain Žika. Strelja wished to rise up the Leskovac nahiya, and asked vojvoda Dobrnjac if he could take hundreds of bećari, but Dobrnjac declined, as he feared a larger Ottoman army would destroy them. Strelja then asked the same of supreme leader Karađorđe, who explained that Leskovac was rich in rivers, meaning easily accessed by the Ottoman army, but he promised a unit to Strelja and the command of Leskovac (as vojvoda) if he first blockaded the Prosečenica road so that the Pasha of Vranje would not manage to Niš. Sava Dedobarac and 450 men joined Strelja, and in 1809 he crossed the Nišava and rose up Vlasotince, Šišava, Boljare, Kruševica, Brezovica, Jastrebac, Gradište, Kozare, Dedinac, Orašje, Grdilica and Dedina Bara. Strelja organized his unit and camped at Vlasotince, then sent Dedobarac with a group to block Prosečenica.

He is enumerated in Serbian epic poetry.

== See also ==
- List of Serbian Revolutionaries

== Sources ==
- Milićević, Milan Đ. (1888). Поменик знаменитих људи у српског народа новијега доба. Издање Чупићеве задужбине. pp. 699–702 – via Archive.org.
- Stojančević, Vladimir (1997). "Лесковац и Ниш" (PDF). Лесковачки зборник. 37: 157–162. ISSN 0459-1070.
