= Janko Popović =

Janko Popović may refer to:

- Cincar-Janko
- Janko Popović Volarić
