= Petar Čardaklija =

Serbian diplomat in the First Serbian Uprising

- Born: Petar Novaković; 1744; Leunovo, Ottoman Empire (now North Macedonia)
- Died: 1810 (aged 65–66); Belgrade, Revolutionary Serbia (now Serbia)
- Burial place: St. Michael's Cathedral, Belgrade
- Military career
- Allegiance: Habsburg monarchy (1788–1804); Revolutionary Serbia (1804–1808)
- Service years: 1788–1791, 1804–1808
- Rank: captain, rittermeister
- Nickname: Čardaklija ("the Frontier Guard")
- Known for: Serbian diplomatic envoy
- Conflicts: Austro-Turkish War (1788–1791), First Serbian Uprising

Petar Čardaklija (Serbian Cyrillic: Петар Чардаклија, 1744–1810) was an Austrian officer who fought in the Austro-Turkish War (1788–1791) and then served as a Serbian rebel diplomat during the First Serbian Uprising, giving up his pension. Due to his intelligence and experience, the Serbian leadership appointed him their diplomatic envoy, and he was on the important missions to St. Petersburg in 1804, Constantinople in 1805, and Russian military command in 1807. With the establishment of the Serbian Governing Council, he became one of its members.

== Early life ==
Petar Novaković (Петар Новаковић) was born in 1744 (being 60 in 1804), in the village of Leunovo in the Sanjak of Debar (now North Macedonia). The Novaković family belonged to the Šućorović brotherhood. He had a brother named Jovan. The nickname čardaklija means "frontier guard", owing to his service in the Habsburg army. He worked as an inn-keeper (handžija) in Belgrade prior to the Austro-Turkish War (1788–1791). He joined the Austrian army and fought in the war, and became an officer ranked captain, and received an Austrian pension following the war. His brother also fought in the war. Petar was also promoted to rittermeister.

After the Austrian retreat, he went to Vienna and then to Buda where he managed to establish close connections in aristocratic circles. His wife was an acquaintance or serving Grand Duchess Alexandra Pavlovna, sister of the Russian emperor Alexander I; princess Alexandra was married to Archduke Joseph, Habsburg governor of Hungary, and lived in Buda. It was in this period that Čardaklija got the title of rittermeister.

== First Serbian Uprising ==
Čardaklija associated with notable Serbs in the Habsburg monarchy that sought the overthrowing of Ottoman rule in the Balkans. When he learned about Serbian uprising led by Karađorđe he sent his wife off to Kharkov with Tanasije Stojković and Teodor Filipović, and then, in June or mid-July 1804, crossed into Serbia and put himself at the service of Karađorđe. Many Austrian officers left the Austrian Empire and joined the Serbian uprising and distinguished themselves, such as captain Radič Petrović and leutnant Đorđe Simić. Čardaklija was one of many that hailed from Macedonia that joined the Serbian rebel leadership; among other Austrian officers that hailed from the Sanjak of Debar, were brothers and captains Vuča Žikić and Kuzman Žikić, and captain Deli-Đorđe Čiplak. By joining the Serbian rebels, he gave up his Austrian pension. Due to his intelligence and experience, the Serbian leadership appointed him their diplomatic envoy, and he was on the important missions to St. Petersburg in 1804, Constantinople in 1805, and Russian military command in 1807. With the establishment of the Serbian Governing Council, he became one of its members.

As the Serbian rebels decided to seek international support for their cause they first turned to Vienna but were refused. Čardaklija advised them to petition the Russian emperor since he would be more inclined on supporting them. Čardaklija persuaded Karađorđe that the best way to do this would be to send a delegation to St. Petersburg. A Serbian delegation made out of Mateja Nenadović, Jovan Protić and Čardaklija started its journey on 1 September to Russia via Wallachia.

On 3 November 1804 the Serbian delegation in St. Petersburg presented their program which included autonomy, "independent Serbian administration", with only taxes being paid to the Sultan. The Serbian delegation to Russia returned in February 1805 with good news, foreign minister Czartoryski deciding to take up the Serbian cause at the Porte. Russia advised the Serbs to send a delegation to the Porte in Constantinople regarding their problems and wishes, which Russia would support. Čardaklija next participated at the national assembly in Pećani. In April 1805 he was again in a diplomatic delegation (together with Aleksa Lazarević, Jovan Protić, and Stevan Živković) that was sent to Constantinople. However, once there the deputies were ill-treated and had to escape to the Russian consulate and then flee from the city fearing for their lives. Čardaklija and Lazarević embarked on a Russian ship and escaped to Odessa. From there they journeyed to St. Petersburg and then back to Belgrade.

When in 1807 Russia decided to militarily help the Serbs, Čardaklija, Avram Lukić and Jeremija Gagić were sent to the Russian Danube army headquarters stationed in Wallachia, where they asked and received a Russian plenipotentiary to act in Serbia to accompany them.

Čardaklija resided in Belgrade until his death in 1810. He was buried in Belgrade's Orthodox cathedral church. Speech at his funeral was held by his friend, the writer Dositej Obradović, at the time minister of education in Serbia. Obradović also wrote the epitaph on his tombstone in which he glorifies Čardaklija as an "immortal Serb". His brother Jovan worked as a Serbian government clerk until the Ottoman suppression of the uprising in 1813. Jovan then fled into exile in Russia with other notable Serbs, where he died.

== See also ==
- List of people of the First Serbian Uprising

== Annotations ==
1. He was known as "Petar Čardaklija" (Петар Чардаклија). His original surname was "Novaković" (Новаковић). K. Protić wrongly calls him "Nikola" regarding the delegation to Constantinople.

== Sources ==
- Batalaka, Lazar Arsenijević (1898). Историја српског устанка, део први [History of the Serbian Uprising: Part One]. Vol. I. Izd. Batalakinoga fonda – via Google Books.
- Batalaka, Lazar Arsenijević (1899). Историја српског устанка, део други [History of the Serbian Uprising: Part Two]. Vol. II. Izd. Batalakinoga fonda – via Google Books.
- Ðorđević, Tihomir R. (1929) [1918]. "Македонија и борба српскога народа за ослобођење". Македонија [Macedonia]. Belgrade: Издање Удружења Јужно-Србијанаца у Београду.
- Nenadović, Konstantin N. (1903) [1883]. Живот и дела великог Ђорђа Петровића Кара-Ђорђа. Vol. I (2 ed.). Belgrade: Штампа Савића и Комп. – via Archive.org.
- Protić, Kosta (1893). "Ратни догађаји из првога српског устанка под Карађорђем Петровићем 1804—1813". Годишњица Николе Чупића. XIII. Državna štamparija.
