= Kozare =

Kozare may refer to:

- Kozare, Albania, a municipality in central Albania
- Kozare, Bulgaria, a village in southeast Bulgaria
- Kozare (Leskovac), a village in southern Serbia

== See also ==
- Kozara (disambiguation)
