= Ilija Novokršteni =

Russian cavalry captain

- Илија Феодорович Угричић
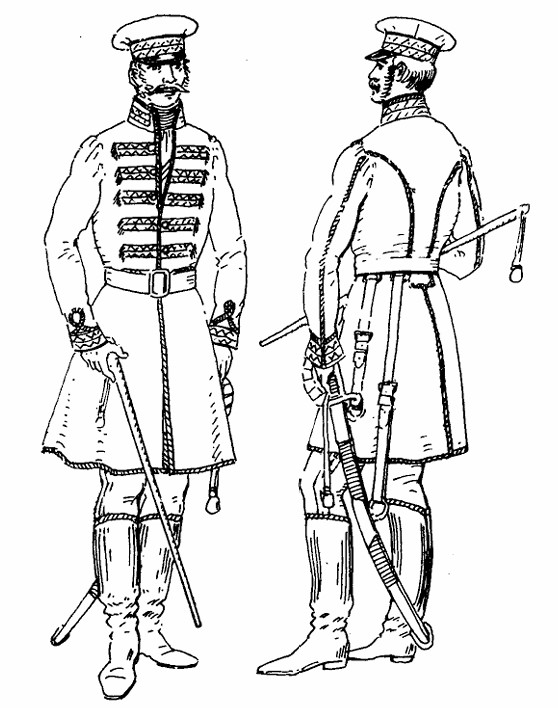
- Artistic illustration of Ilija Novokršteni and his uniform
- Born: Ilija Feodorovič Ugričić; Before 1766; Poltava Governorate, Russian Empire
- Died: 1813; Possibly Siberia, Russian Empire
- Other name: Trebinjski
- Military career
- Allegiance: Russian Empire; Revolutionary Serbia (1806–09)
- Service years: 1806–1809
- Rank: poruchik, kapetan, policajmajstor
- Nicknames: Novokršteni, Novokreščeni
- Units: Chuguev Cossack Regiment; Karađorđe's Corps (1806–09); Danube Army (1806)
- Commands: Belgrade police, training instructor for regular battalions
- Known for: First Serbian police chief
- Conflicts: First Serbian Uprising

Ilija Feodorovič Ugričić (fl. 1806–d. 1813), known as Novokršteni was a Russian cavalry captain that was sent to Serbia during the First Serbian Uprising to gather information for the Russian Military command for the coming Russian-Ottoman war. Novokršteni joined the Serb rebels against the Ottoman Empire and participated in many battles in which he was wounded, and became respected by the leadership and people. He trained troops at Belgrade and was appointed the first modern Serbian police chief in 1808. A staunch supporter of supreme commander Karađorđe, he was deported to Siberia in 1809 by the Russian Command following slander by Konstantin Rodofinikin, another Russian envoy in Serbia and Karađorđe's opponent.

== Biography ==
=== Early life ===
The Ugričić was a Serb family that hailed from Herzegovina. The family received nobility status in the Poltava Governorate (est. 1802) and the family name included the demonym Trebinjski (Russian: Угричич-Требинский) derived from Trebinje in Herzegovina. He was a Russian cavalry captain, ranked as poruchik, and had served in the Imperial Russian Chuguev Cossack Regiment. He was retired on 12 December [O.S. 31 December] 1800. In Serbia he was called a kapetan (captain). At the time of the liberation of Belgrade (December 1806), he was between 40 and 50 years of age, meaning he would be born in the period of 1756–1766.

He was not related to lawyer Jevtimije Ugričić (1800–1886).

=== Beginning of Serbian-Russian relations ===
Russia planned for conflict with the Ottoman Empire, and sought to maintain influence in Serbia through its representatives who engaged themselves in internal affairs, also being intermediaries in the conflict between Karađorđe and other top commanders. The commander of the Dniester Army Ivan Mikhelson sent cavalry captain Ilija Ugričić-Trebinjski ("Bey Novokršteni" in correspondence) to Serbia to investigate intents towards Russia and at the same time aid the Serbian army in battles against the Ottomans as a military expert. Mikhelson sent Novokršteni to general Ivan Ivanovich Isaev on 1 April 1806, as an "able, meritorious, loyal officer". On 22 April [O.S. 10 April] 1806 Mikhelson informed Russian Interior Minister Czartoryski that he intended to send Novokršteni to Serbia to find out what the Serbs thought of Russia and other necessary factors. On 26 May [O.S. 14 May] 1806 Novokršteni wrote to Mikhelson from Timișoara (then part of Hungary) that he was on his way to Serbia. It is unknown when exactly Novokršteni joined the Serbian command, but it is known that he was present in Serbia by mid-June 1806. At the same time, the Russian Ministry of Internal Affairs sent Council member Konstantin Rodofinikin to Moldavia to observe events in Ottoman Europe and to find ways to rally the Serbs to support Russian operations in case of a Russo-Ottoman war. Mikhelson organized recruitment of Serb volunteers in Wallachia.

=== Serbian Uprising ===
Novokršteni had entered Serbia via Kovin (in Habsburg territory) and registered himself at Smederevo and met up with vojvoda Vujica Vuličević of the Smederevo nahija. Vuličević sent him with his scribe Anta Protić and three momci (bodyguards) to Belgrade to meet up with Karađorđe at Vračar. He introduced himself to Karađorđe wearing Russian adjutant uniform. Novokršteni volunteered in the Serb army and cared for his own costs. He was the first Russian that the Serbian rebels befriended and he became very popular among them, becoming respected and admired by Karađorđe and other leaders.

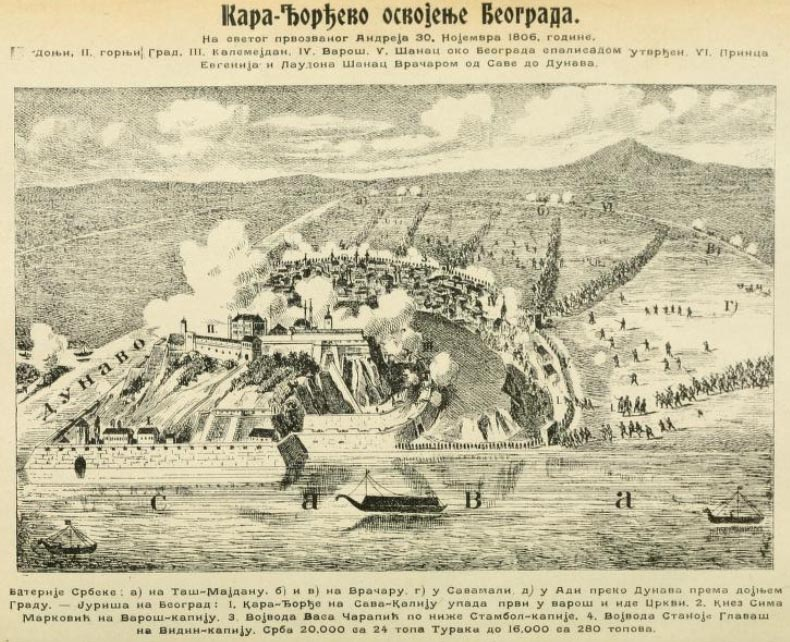
Siege of Belgrade, where Trebinjski was wounded in the Serbian charge for the town.

Already the second day at Belgrade, Novokršteni joined the Serb rebels in fighting the Belgrade Turks that left the Fortress to fight the Serbs in the fields. Karađorđe feared a large Ottoman mustering and decided with the Council that Belgrade should be taken as soon as possible. The Belgrade Turks were offered to leave harmlessly, but they refused, on 27 June [O.S. 15 June] 1806. Karađorđe wrote to Mikhelson that "none of us wants him [Novokršteni] to leave" in a letter asking for aid and swearing allegiance, dated 30 June [O.S. 18 June] 1806, sent from Smederevo. The same day another letter was sent to the Russian emperor informing of the Ottoman intent to "exterminate all male Serbs" and also asking Russia for armament. On 7 July [O.S. 22 June] 1806 Karađorđe ordered for 2,000 troops put under the command of captain Novokršteni to push through the fences into the Belgrade lower town (donji varoš), but they were fended off twice. During the assault, Metropolitan Leontius left the inner city and joined the Serbs. At the same time, news came of 3,000 Ottoman Bosnian troops crossing the Drina and surrounding vojvoda Luka Lazarević at the trenches in Crna Bara. A Serbian detachment under Karađorđe set out and defeated those troops by the Drina. Novokršteni sent a letter to Russian Interior Minister Czartoryski asking for the establishment of a Russian military unit made up of Serbs and Bulgarians.

In September 1806 Novokršteni returned briefly to Russia, having set out as mentioned in a letter of Karađorđe dated 31 August [O.S. 19 August] 1806 and arriving at the chancellery of Foreign Minister Andreas Eberhard von Budberg on 7 September [O.S. 26 August] 1806. Novokršteni travelled to Wallachia and informed Mikhelson of the events in Serbia and gave him a letter from Karađorđe in which it was also asked that Mikhelson let Novokršteni return as soon as possible, which he did, bringing with him another letter to Karađorđe who stayed at Topola. Karađorđe had a gathering at Topola which Novokršteni and other leaders attended during which Karađorđe had his own brother hanged for crimes.

An Ottoman Bosnian army numbering 15,000 assembled by the Drina at Sikirić toward Soko and pushed out Serb rebels from three trenches, which alarmed Šumadija from where an army assembled (numbering 12,000), among whom were also Novokršteni. At the assembly of the Serb army, on 25 October 1806, Novokršteni immediately came up with a plan for attack and the division of the Serb army into three parts, which succeeded, panicking the "Turks" who fled back across the Drina and had many casualties and left much loot. Novokršteni was known as especially brave and participated in many battles of the Serb rebels, such as the battles on the Drina where he was wounded, and the charge for overtaking Belgrade on 12 December 1806, where he was also wounded. He participated in the liberation of the city as an ordinary soldier, and removed his Russian uniform and wore traditional dress. Following the takeover of Belgrade, the Pasha of Belgrade was allowed to leave the city, however, his entourage was ambushed and killed. It was Novokršteni who advised Karađorđe to have the Pasha killed, due to either having orders from Russia, or his acquired personal hatred towards Turks.

After the string of victories in 1806, such as important ones at Mišar in August, Deligrad in September, and liberation of Belgrade in December 1806, the Serbs still hoped to secure statehood with Russia's aid, and again petitioned the Russian emperor to send troops. The Ottomans declared war on Russia on 26 December 1806, being pressured by the French. Novokršteni wholeheartedly fought for the Serbian liberation and was outspoken against those he believed did not. He was wounded several times in battle.

On 11 January 1807 general Mikhelson praised the Serb people for their courage and Karađorđe for his "wisdom and perseverance" and promised the Serbs their own independent state as "the Serb people are worthy [...] of being ashamed to pay tribute to Turks". The letter received great response, however, unbeknownst to the Serbs, Mikhelson had no such mandate. Mikhelson believed that the Serbs could help in the Russo-Turkish War, and feared most that the Serbian leadership would enter relations with the French, and informed the Russian government that the first who offered help to the Serbs would secure their patronage. Novokršteni updated Mikhelson on Serbian military strength. In late 1806 and early 1807 the Serbian leadership demanded independence and declared Serbia an independent state.

Novokršteni accompanied general Isaev who was dispatched to Oltenia on 30 April [O.S. 18 April] 1807 to join the Serbian rebels. Russian general Ivan Ivanovich Isayev arrived in Serbia with 1,500 Russian troops on 7 June 1807. Another Russian agent, Filippo Paulucci, was dispatched to Serbia in June 1807 with the task of ensuring the Serbs of a Russian alliance and to discuss military plans and joint operations. An unratified treaty known as "Paulucci's Convention" was signed on 28 June 1807. Novokršteni was said to have been an intermediary in the discussions regarding the treaty, although he is not explicitly mentioned. Rodofinikin arrived in Belgrade on 11 July [O.S. 29 June] 1807. Meanwhile, Mikhelson died on 17 August [O.S. 5 August] 1807.

On 1 November [O.S. 20 October] 1807 Rodofinikin sent a letter to Interior Minister Alexey Kurakin regarding Serb victories at the Drina, where Novokršteni was among the commanders.

=== Regular battalions and police chief ===
Novokršteni professionally trained troops at Belgrade, including the first regular (professional, standing) battalions that Karađorđe had established in 1808, training them for 13–14 months. Novokršteni was most loyal to Karađorđe, and he held Karađorđe's opponents in the Serbian leadership as his own opponents, which, along with his popularity, angered Russian envoy Rodofinikin. Novokršteni disliked both Rodofinikin and Metropolitan Leontius, and they were known to have worked against the interests of Karađorđe. Both have a negative legacy in Serbian historiography.

The Belgrade Police was established at the beginning of 1808, following a Belgrade Senate decision dating 30 December 1807, most likely examined at the earlier 26 October assembly which saw the expansion of magistrates (courts) also at the town and village level. Up until then, policing was entrusted to the vojvoda, obor-knez and knez at the nahija and knežina (group of villages) level. Novokršteni was appointed the director of Police (policajmajstor) at Belgrade, becoming the first modern Serbian police chief. The Belgrade city was administratively divided into three parts, each under the supervision of a policaj kvartal-majstor. Novokršteni was at first practically subordinated the titular commander of the Belgrade city Mladen Milovanović (the Prime Minister), prior to further regulations.

Rodofinikin wrote in a letter to commander-in-chief Alexander Prozorovsky dated 21 November [O.S. 9 November] 1808, which included an overview of the judicial courts in Serbia and also the church courts, that "it would be beneficial" to exclude secular people (who sometimes judged in disputes) from the latter. There was a lack of canonists in Revolutionary Serbia which resulted in some problems in regulating the church courts; in late 1808 and early 1809 the Serbian Governing Council sought to bring order but according to Rodofinikin, "two unfit" were chosen, Novokršteni and a refugee protodeacon from Montenegro (who remains unidentified), without the knowing of Metropolitan Leontius.

He remained at the post as police chief until 19 March [O.S. 7 March] 1809 or the beginning of April 1809, when he was called by the Russian Command to Bucharest (Russian-held Wallachia). Novokršteni had intended to stay in Serbia, and lived in a house previously owned by a Turk (the house was later bought by vojvoda turned Minister Jakov Nenadović).

=== Deportation ===
Rodofinikin slandered Novokršteni to commander-in-chief Alexander Prozorovsky, who decided to have him summoned to Bucharest, where he was indicted on false grounds and deported to Siberia. The Serbs were never informed of this at the time. There is an account by historian M. Vukićević that Novokršteni was imprisoned after he made accusations against Rodofinikin at the Interior Ministry in St. Petersburg. The Serbs asked the Russian Command to return Novokršteni to Serbia but this was declined "due to his interference in spiritual affairs". In 1812 Karađorđe asked the diplomatic emissary to Serbia, general Marko Ivelich, to talk to general Pavel Chichagov and have Novokršteni released but this also failed. He died in 1813, likely in Siberia.

He was described as healthy, tall, without higher education, an able soldier, innocent and honest. For two days, 12–13 May 1940, a half-page newspaper article about him was published in Vreme.

== See also ==
- List of Serbian Revolutionaries
- Konstantin Rodofinikin (1760–1838), Russian agent in Serbia
- Paul von Mitesser (1757–1833), Austrian agent in Serbia

== Annotations ==
1. His full name was Ilija Feodorovič Ugričić (Serbian: Илија Феодоровић Угричић, Russian: Илъя Феодорович Угричич). He used the pseudonym "Bey Novokreštenov" (Russian: Бей Новокрещеновъ) on 26 May [O.S. 14 May] 1806. In a letter from Karađorđe to Mikhelson dated 18 July 1806, his name is given as "Ugričić Trebinjski" (Russian: Угричич Требинский), while Karađorđe acknowledged the use of the pseudonym "Bey Novokreščeni" (Бей Новокрещеный) in future correspondence. The pseudonym varied slightly in the diplomatic documents, with or without "Bey", and some times with the suffix -ov (Serbian: Новокрштени/Novokršteni, Новокрешчени/Novokreščeni, Новокрешченов/Novokreščenov). "Novokreštenov" (Новокрещенов) without "bey" was used on 12 August 1806. The peculiar pseudonym had the meaning of "the Newly Baptized (Bey)". Trebinjski (Russian: Требиньский, Требинский, Serbian: Требињски) is the demonym for Trebinje, part of the ennobled family name (Russian: Угричич Требинский). He was known in Serbian simply as "captain Ilija" (Капетан Илија/Kapetan Ilija). He is known in historiography as Ilija Novokršteni (Илија Новокрштени).
2. French intelligence received information on 12 June [O.S. 31 May] 1806 that an officer was sent to the Serbian camp from Wallachia. An Italian envoy was informed in a letter dated 15 June [O.S. 3 June] 1806 that "a Russian cavalry captain of Serb origin", Novokršteni, was present among the Serbs, secretly sent by Mikhelson. There is an account that Novokršteni was sent for the first time in 1804 during the uprising by the Russian Interior Ministry.

== Sources ==
- Bataković, Dušan T. (2006). "A Balkan-Style French Revolution? The 1804 Serbian Uprising in European Perspective". Balcanica (36): 113–128. doi:10.2298/BALC0536113B.
- Batalaka, Lazar Arsenijević (1898). Историја српског устанка. Vol. I. Izd. Batalakinoga fonda. pp. 213–216, 223–224, 316–320, 367–369, 595, 755–757.
- Desnica, Gojko (1977a). Стварање српске државе у револуцији: 1804-1813. Републичка заједница науке СР Србије. pp. 77, 87.
- Desnica, Gojko (1977b). Карађорђе: целокупна историја вожда Србије, 1768-1817. Школа Вук Стефановић Караџић. pp. 170, 286, 372.
- Đorđević, Vladan (1892). Jovanović, Milan (ed.). "Bogišićeve zbirke". Otadžbina. 10 (32 (125–129)): 374–.
- Drašković, Radovan M. (1987). Valjevo u prošlosti: prilozi za zavičajnu istoriju. Milić Rakić. p. 57. ISBN 978-86-7173-008-2.
- Istorijski arhiv Beograda
  - Dinić, Mihailo (1955). Грађа из земунских архива за историју Првог српског устанка (I) 1804-1808. Београд: Istorijski arhiv Beograda.
  - Grupa autora (1961). Ilić, Tanasije (ed.). Грађа из земунских архива за историју Првог српског устанка (II) 1809. Београд: Istorijski arhiv Beograda. pp. 44, 45, 82, 83, 92, 136.
  - Peruničić, Branko (1969). Ilić, Tanasije (ed.). Грађа из земунских архива за историју Првог српског устанка (III) 1810-1813. Београд: Istorijski arhiv Beograda.
- Grachev, Viktor Petrovich (2003). Сербы и черногорцы в борьбе за национальную независимость и Россия: 1805-1807 гг. Ин-т славяноведения. pp. 122–123. ISBN 978-5-7576-0079-6.
- Janković, Dragoslav (1984). Srpska država prvog ustanka. Nolit. pp. 123–124, 285.
- Janković, Dragoslav (1959). "La première insurrection serbe dans la presse française". Грађа. Српска академија наука, Научно дело: 159, 161, 166.
- Katkov, Mikhail (1863). "Сербский вопрос". Русскій Вѣстникъ. 46. St. Petersburg: 89–167.
- Knežević, Milivoje (12 May 1940a). "Илија Новокрештени". Vreme. Belgrade. p. 9., Knežević, Milivoje (13 May 1940b). "Илија Новокрештени". Vreme. Belgrade. p. 7.
- Meriage, Lawrence P. (1975). Russia and the First Serbian Revolution. Indiana University.
- Mišković, Jovan (1895). Српска војска и војевање за време устанака: од 1804-1815 год. štampano u štampariji Kraljevine Srbije. pp. 22–24, 31.
- Muzej grada Beograda (1972). Годишњак града Београда. Vol. 19. Izd. Muzej grada Beograda. pp. 17–18.
- Nadoveza, B.; Đokić, N. (2023). "РАТНЕ ОПЕРАЦИЈЕ СРБА И РУСА ПРОТИВ ОСМАНЛИЈА У ИСТОЧНОЈ СРБИЈИ 1807. ГОДИНЕ" [WAR OPERATIONS OF SERBS AND RUSSIANS AGAINST THE OTTOMANS IN 1807]. Архивско наслеђе. 17. Зајечар: 25–46.
- Nenadović, Konstantin N. (1884). Живот и дела великог Ђорђа Петровића Кара-Ђорђа. Vol. II (1 ed.). Vienna: У Штампарији Јована Н. Вернаја. pp. 88–90 – via Google Books.
- Nenadović, Konstantin N. (1903) [1883]. Живот и дела великог Ђорђа Петровића Кара-Ђорђа. Vol. I (2 ed.). Belgrade: Штампа Савића и Комп. pp. VIII, 133–134 – via Archive.org.
- Pavlović, Vojislav G.; Milosavljević, Boris (2020). Београдски родослови. Balkanološki institut SANU. ISBN 978-86-7179-110-6.
- Popović, Bogdan Lj. (2010). Дипломатска историја Србије. Завод за Уџбенике. ISBN 978-86-17-16975-4.
- Radovanović, Radovan (2010). "Полицијска служба у првом српском устанку". Историја Поморавља и два века Варваринске битке. Историјски архив, Крушевац. pp. 273–. ISBN 978-86-82-39-5-65-2.
- Šarkić, Srđan (2013). "РУСКИ ПРОЈЕКТИ ДРЖАВНОГ УРЕЂЕЊА УСТАНИЧКЕ СРБИЈЕ (Први део – такозвана "Паулучијева конвенција")" [Russian attempts on constitutional issue of insurgent Serbia (Part one: The so-called "Paulucci Convention")]. Zbornik radova Pravnog fakulteta Novi Sad. 47 (2): 25–37. ISSN 0550-2179.
- Stojančević, Vladimir (2009). Iz istorije prvog srpskog ustanka, 1804-1813: odabrani radovi. Istorijski arhiv Šumadije. ISBN 978-86-80485-07-2.
- Vasić, Pavle (1968). "униформе српске војске за време првог устанка" (PDF). Зборник Историјског музеја Србије. V. Историјски музеј Србије: 47–.
- Vukićević, Milenko M. (1912a). Karađorđe: Istorija ustanka od 1804-1807. Štampano u Državnoj štampariji Kraljevine Srbije. pp. 383, 601.
- Vukićević, Milenko M. (1912b). "Iz vojnih ustanova Karađorđeva vremena". Godišnjica Nikole Čupića. XXXI. Beograd.
- Vukićević, Milenko M. (28 August 1905). "Sudovi i njihovo uređenje". Policijski glasnik (34): 324–326.
