= Kozara (disambiguation) =

Kozara may refer to:

- Kozara, mountain in western Bosnia and Herzegovina
- Kozara National Park, national park established in 1967 in the area around the Kozara mountain
- Battle of Kozara (also known as Operation West-Bosnien), World War II battle between the Yugoslav partisans and Axis forces at the mountain
- Kozara (film), 1962 Yugoslav film about the Battle of Kozara
- FK Kozara, association football club based in Gradiška in northwestern Bosnia
- Kozara, barracks in Banjaluka

It may also refer to:

- Kožara, island on the Danube river in Belgrade, Serbia

== See also ==
- Kozare (disambiguation)
