= Todor Vojinović =

Serbian revolutionary (1760–1813)

Todor Vojinović (c. 1760–1813) was a Serbian voivode and a revolutionary during the First Serbian Uprising. He was killed while fighting the Ottoman Turks in Serbia in 1813.

Todor Vojinović was born around 1760 in Gornji Dobrić, a village in today's municipality of Loznica in western Serbia's Mačva district, but then part of Jadar nahija. He was a veteran fighter, a Boluk-bashi (an Ottoman officer rank equivalent to captain) of the Serbian Free Corps that fought the Ottomans during Koča Anđelković frontier rebellion and the Austro-Turkish War (1787–1791). The Serbian Corps liberated a part of the Sanjak of Smederevo, which became part of Habsburg-occupied Serbia (1788–1792).

In 1804, Đorđe Ćurčija took Jadar and Rača from the Tuks and named Vojinović Boluk-bashi of the right bank of the Jadar region. From then on, Vojinović remained the only senior military commander at Jadar until Anta Bogićević. elevated him to the rank of Voivode. When Karađorđe's insurrection failed, Vojinović was captured by the Turkish occupying forces and was summarily hanged in 1813.

== Sources ==
- Morison, W. A. (2012) [1942]. The Revolt of the Serbs Against the Turks: (1804–1813). Cambridge University Press. ISBN 978-1-107-67606-0.
- Petrovich, Michael Boro (1976). A history of modern Serbia, 1804-1918. Harcourt Brace Jovanovich. ISBN 9780151409501.
- Ranke, Leopold von (1847). History of Servia, and the Servian Revolution: From Original Mss. and Documents. J. Murray.

== See also ==
- List of Serbian Revolutionaries
