= Stevan Živković-Telemak =

Serbian author (1780–1831)

Stefan Živković-Telemak also known as Stefan Živković-Nišlija (1780-1831) is the author of Obnovljene Srbije, 1780-1831 (Serbie nouvelle, 1780-1731) and Serbian translator of François Fénelon's Les Aventures de Télémaque. His nickname is attributed to his translation of Fénelon's classic. He corresponded and collaborated with Vuk Karadžić during the literary reforms.

Originally from the Srem region, Stefan Živković graduated from college, and became a clerk in Karađorđe's National Assembly (Soviet) during the First Serbian Uprising. He was also sent on special diplomatic delegations by Karađorđe, though later in 1811 they parted company. Živković married Savka Čarkadžija, the daughter of Petar Čardaklija and a cousin of Vuk Karadžić with whom he collaborated collecting Serbian national folk songs.

The works of Fénelon and Cicero inspired the Serbian revolutionaries of the First Serbian Uprising and Second Serbian Uprising, thanks to the translated works of Stefan Živković-Telemak and other authors.

== Translated works ==
- Les Aventures de Télémaque by François Fénelon in Serbian in 1814.
- Tusculanae Disputationes by Cicero translated as Tuskulanischen Gespräche in German and later in Serbian.
