= Živko Dabić =

Serbian captain (1777–1808)

Živko Dabić (Serbian: Живко Дабић; Jautina, near Valjevo, 1777 - Badovinci, Mačva, 1808) was a captain (boluk-bashi) in the First Serbian Uprising under the command of his father-in-law Jakov Nenadović. Also, he was a representative of his district in the first Serbian national assembly held in Ostružnica near Belgrade in April and May 1804.

== Biography ==
Živko Dabić was born in the village of Jautina in the nahiya of Valjevo in 1777 or 1778.

When the uprising against the Dahije in Šumadija broke out at the beginning of 1804, the Serbian War of Liberation began. Živko Dabić joined the revolutionaries as an ordinary soldier, fighting side-by-side with his compatriots from Valjevo. Later, he became Jakov Nenadović's right-hand-man (Momak) and as such, was given greater responsibilities in command. On 17 January 1806 Živko Dabić with Luka Lazarević scattered the Turks at the Jadar river near Lešnica.

The uprising continued to spread over Kolubara, with voivodes Jakov Nenadović and Živko Dabić reaching Šabac from Valjevo. In a short time, Živko Dabić and his senior voivodes Jakov Nenadović and Luka Lazarević became among the leading fighters in the Šabac Nahiya. Živko's father-in-law commanded the northwestern Valjevo nahiya at the time.

From 1805, when the rebels fought for liberation, against the Ottoman Empire, Dabić, Nenadović, and Lazarević garnered several important victories with their bravery and strategic tactics. On 6 January 1806 Živko Dabić, Jakov Nenadović, and Luka Lazarević began the siege of Šabac, while Karađorđe set off from Belgrade to join them; on the way, Karađorđe learned that Ottoman Bosnian troops were about to cross the Drina and thus immediately dispatched Lazarević. Arriving at Lešnica on 17 January 1806, Živko Dabić under the command of Luka Lazarević defeated the Turks at Ranitovac after a day of fighting, with much of the enemy troops drowning in the Jadar river. He also participated in the Battle of Čučuge on 4 April 1806 with his kin Gaja Dabić.

Dabić died in the Battle of Loznica in 1808. His remains were taken from the battlefield to a cemetery at the Kaone Monastery.

== Sources ==
- Milan Đ. Milićević, Pomenik znamenitih ljudi u srpskog narodu novijega doba, Vol 1 (Belgrade, 1888)
- Milan Đ. Milićević,Kneževina Srbija (Belgrade, 1878)
- Lazar Arsenijević Batalaka, Istorija srpskog ustanka (Belgrade, 1898)
- Konstantin N. Nenadović, Život i dela velikog Đorđa Petrovića Kara Đorđa Vrhovnog Vožda... (Vienna, 1884)
- Record of Karađorđe Petrović, Belgrade 1848;
- Record protocol of the letter priest Matija Nenadović on the war along the Drina in 1811, 1812, and 1813, Belgrade 1861;
- Memoirs of Matija Nenadović, Belgrade 1867;
- I. Stojšić, Jedna zaboravljena porodica, Naša nahija (almanah), Belgrade, 1926.

== See also ==
- List of Serbian Revolutionaries
