= Leunovo =

- Village
- Леуново
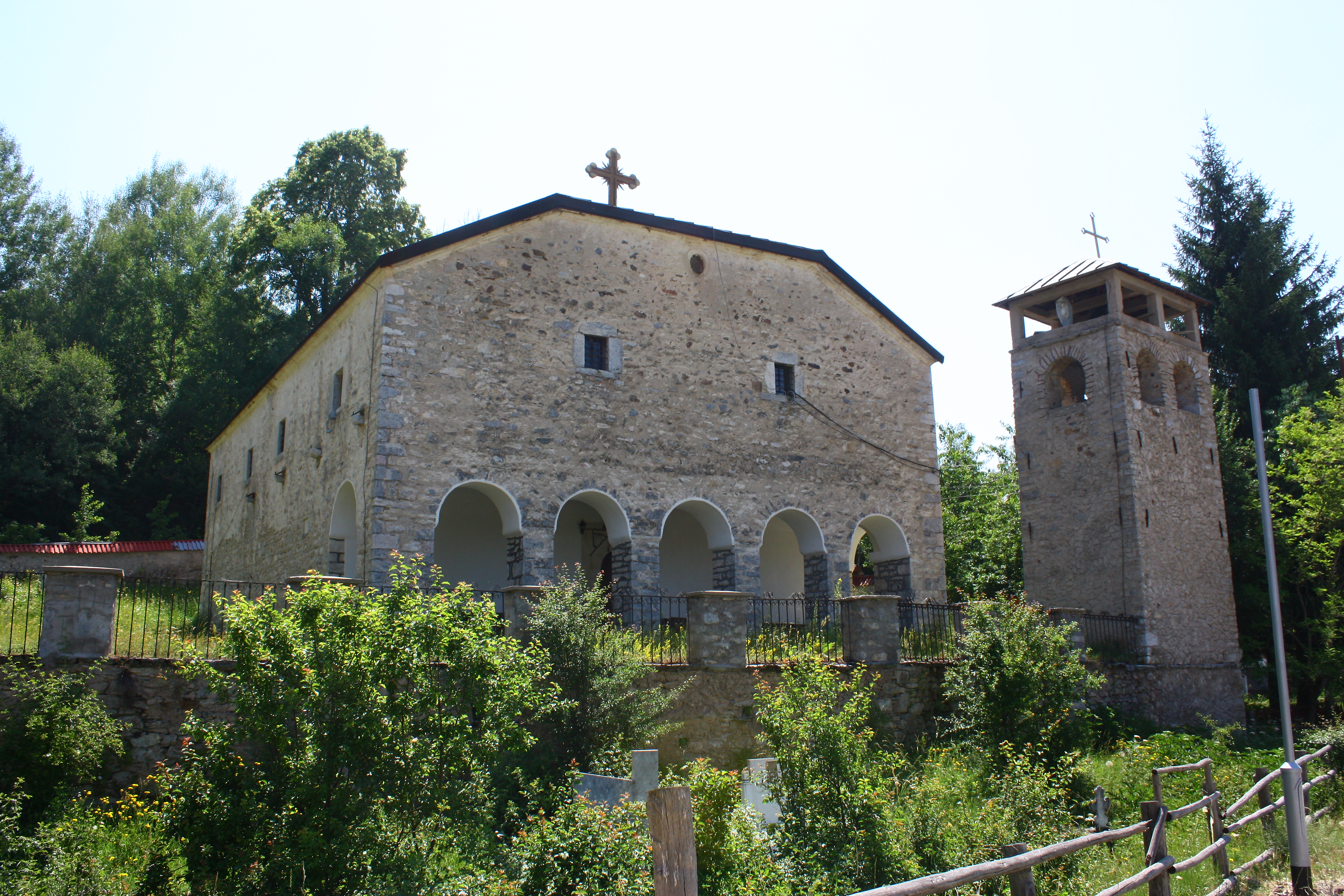
- Church in Leunovo

- Location within North Macedonia
- Coordinates: 41.6632°N 20.7971°E
- Country: North Macedonia
- Region: Polog
- Municipality: Mavrovo and Rostuša

Population (2021)
  - Total: 31
- Time zone: UTC+1 (CET)
  - Summer (DST): UTC+2 (CEST)
- Car plates: GV
- Website: .

Leunovo (Macedonian: Леуново) is a village in the municipality of Mavrovo and Rostuša, Gostivar, North Macedonia.

== Demographics ==
Leunovo is attested in the 1467/68 Ottoman tax registry (defter) for the Nahiyah of Kalkandelen. The village had a total of 85 Christian households, 4 bachelors and 1 widows.

In statistics gathered by Vasil Kanchov in 1900, the village was inhabited by 900 Christian Bulgarians and 55 Muslim Albanians. Kanchov noted the village as being bilingual in Albanian and Bulgarian, with the latter being the language spoken in the househould. According to the 1929 ethnographic map by Russian Slavist Afanasy Selishchev, Leunovo was a mixed Bulgarian-Albanian village.

Year	Macedonian	Albanian	Turks	Romani	Vlachs	Serbs	Bosniaks	Others	PWDTAS	Total
1953	344	86	...	...	...	...	...	6	...	436
1961	194	53	16	...	...	...	...	2	...	265
1971	72	18	15	...	...	...	...	1	...	106
1981	38	9	...	...	...	...	...	13	...	60
1994	26	10	...	...	...	...	...	4	...	40
2002	6	...	...	...	...	...	...	...	...	6
2021	27	...	...	...	...	...	...	...	4	31

As of the 2021 census, Leunovo had 31 residents with the following ethnic composition:

- Macedonians 27
- Persons for whom data are taken from administrative sources 4
