= Gaja Dabić =

Gaja Dabić (Jautina, near Valjevo, Serbia, c. 1780 - after 1847) was a duke and leading commander in the Serbian Revolution. His military title was captain of Tamnava, principality of Valjevo Nahija. He was one of the responsible leaders who, along with his kin Živko Dabić defeated the Turks at the Battle of Čučuge on April 4, 1806.
