= Ivan Ivanovich Isaev =

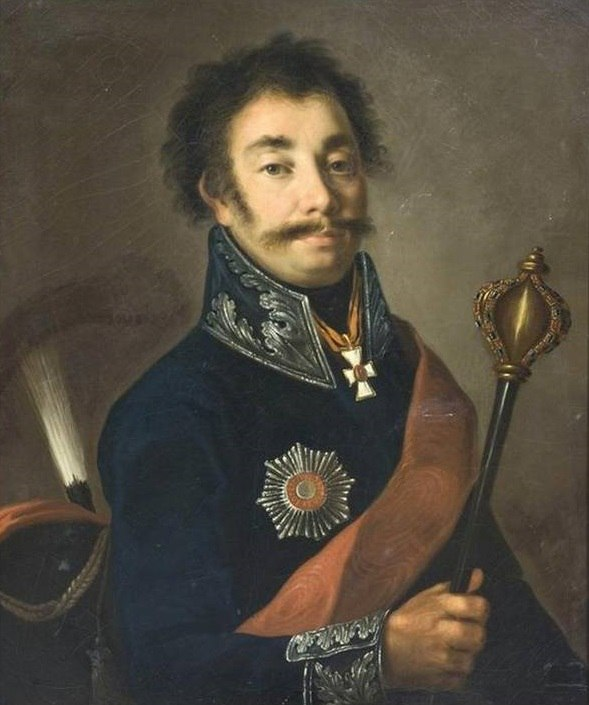
- Portrait by an unknown artist (1807–10)
- Born: Ivan Ivanovich Isaev; 1748; Starocherkasskaya, Russian Empire
- Died: 26 August 1810 (aged 61–62); Serbia
- Military career
- Allegiance: Russian Empire
- Service years: 1764–1810
- Rank: major-general
- Units: Don Cossacks; Danube Army
- Conflicts: Russo-Turkish Wars (1768–1774, 1787–1791 and 1806–1812); Pugachev's rebellion; Polish–Russian War of 1792; Kościuszko Uprising; First Serbian Uprising
- Awards: Order of St. George (IV and III degree); Order of Saint Anna (I degree)

Ivan Ivanovich Isaev (Russian: Иван Иванович Исаев, 1748–1810) was a Russian general who fought in the Russian-Ottoman wars of 1768–1774, 1787–1791 and 1806–1812, distinguishing himself in all wars and being promoted and awarded medals. He was wounded several times.

== Early service ==
Isaev was born in 1748 in Starocherkasskaya, Rostov, in traditional Don Cossack territory. He began his service in 1764 as a clerk of the Military Chancellery.

In 1769, he participated in the Russo-Turkish War (1768–1774), performing the duties of a field clerk. In 1771, for distinction in battle, he received the Cossack rank of yesaul. On May 30, 1772, he was promoted to the rank of sergeant-major. He was wounded by a bullet in the battle of Chernovody (1773), and was promoted to prime-major on 24 November 1774 and awarded a gold medal for distinction.

In 1775, he was sent to Orenburg to suppress Pugachev rebel detachments. From 1783 he was on the Kuban line and in campaigns beyond the Kuban against the Nogai and mountain detachments.

== Distinction ==
Isaev was promoted to lieutenant-colonel on 1 June 1787 while stationed in Dnieper, and he participated in the Russo-Turkish War (1787–1791), fighting at at Kinburn (October 1787) under the command of general Alexander Suvorov. He was wounded in the right arm and was awarded the Order of St. George (IV degree) on 18 October 1787. He was promoted to colonel on 24 June 1788 for capturing Ochakov, then participated in the battles near Bendery on 6 December 1788.

He participated in the Polish–Russian War of 1792 and received the rank of brigadier in 1793. He fought in several battles of the Kościuszko Uprising (March–November 1794), and was awarded the Order of St. George (III degree) for leading Cossack regiments in the victories at Krupczyce and Brest in September. He was wounded in the chest in the victory at Kobyłka for which he was promoted to major-general and in 1795 also received 675 serfs. Due to the sustained injuries he went into retirement in 1797.

Isaev returned to service in 1806 and participated in the 1806–1812, in which he commanded Cossack and regular army units organized into the Danube Army. He was sent by the Russian Command to Revolutionary Serbia for joint operations with the Serbs in their uprising.

== Serbia ==
Russian general Isaev arrived in Serbia with 1,500 Russian troops on 19 June [O.S. 7 June] 1807. He fought alongside Serb troops, with interruptions, until 10 July 1809. Other Russian agents in Serbia were cavalry captain Ilija Novokršteni who joined the Serbian command (present since June 1806), diplomat Filippo Paulucci (June 1807) who was to ensure Russian alliance, diplomat Konstantin Rodofinikin (July 1807) who focused on internal affairs, and cavalry general Joseph Cornelius O'Rourke (1809) and major Cukatov (1810), who joined operations.

Isaev moved with his troops from Wallachia and crossed the Danube into the Serbian-held Kladovo and Brza Palanka where he met up with Serbian supreme commander Karađorđe. They were accompanied on 21 June [O.S. 9 June] 1807 by two Russian generals, 18 officers, and many artillerists. The combined forces went and rescued the surrounded Serb troops at Malajnica, decisively defeating Mulla Pasha of Vidin who however managed to escape. Karađorđe was very impressed with the Olonets Regiment that participated. Isaev took part in the signing of the so-called "Paulucci's Convention" (10 July 1807), an unratified treaty regarding Russian-Serbian relations and aid in the uprising.

Next, Isaev was stationed in the Timok region where he monitored the Ottoman army of the Sanjak of Vidin, then wintered in Russian-held Oltenia. He returned to Serbia around Kladovo on 14 July [O.S. 2 July] 1809 with six battalions, two Cossack detachments, and 500 pandurs. He led an assault on the Ottoman army at Kladovo on 21 July [O.S. 9 July] 1809 but suffered great losses and retreated the next day. He died suddenly in Serbia on 26 August 1810.

== Legacy ==
Count A. F. Langeron said the following about the death of I. I. Isaev:

A smart, active, intelligent man, who commanded the troops well. The death of this general was a great loss for the army. He was one of those few generals whose courage and knowledge would be of great benefit to the fatherland.

== Sources ==
- Lobov, Oleg Nikolaevich (2003). Донцы ХІХ века. Изд-во "НВ". ISBN 978-5-98155-005-8.
- Nenadović, Konstantin N. (1884). Живот и дела великог Ђорђа Петровића Кара-Ђорђа. Vol. II (1 ed.). Vienna: У Штампарији Јована Н. Вернаја. pp. 90–91 – via Google Books.
- Šarkić, Srđan (2013). "РУСКИ ПРОЈЕКТИ ДРЖАВНОГ УРЕЂЕЊА УСТАНИЧКЕ СРБИЈЕ (Први део – такозвана "Паулучијева конвенција")" [Russian attempts on constitutional issue of insurgent Serbia (Part one: The so-called "Paulucci Convention")]. Zbornik radova Pravnog fakulteta Novi Sad. 47 (2): 25–37. ISSN 0550-2179.
