= Miokus =

Miokus Миокус (Serbian)
- Village (Selo)
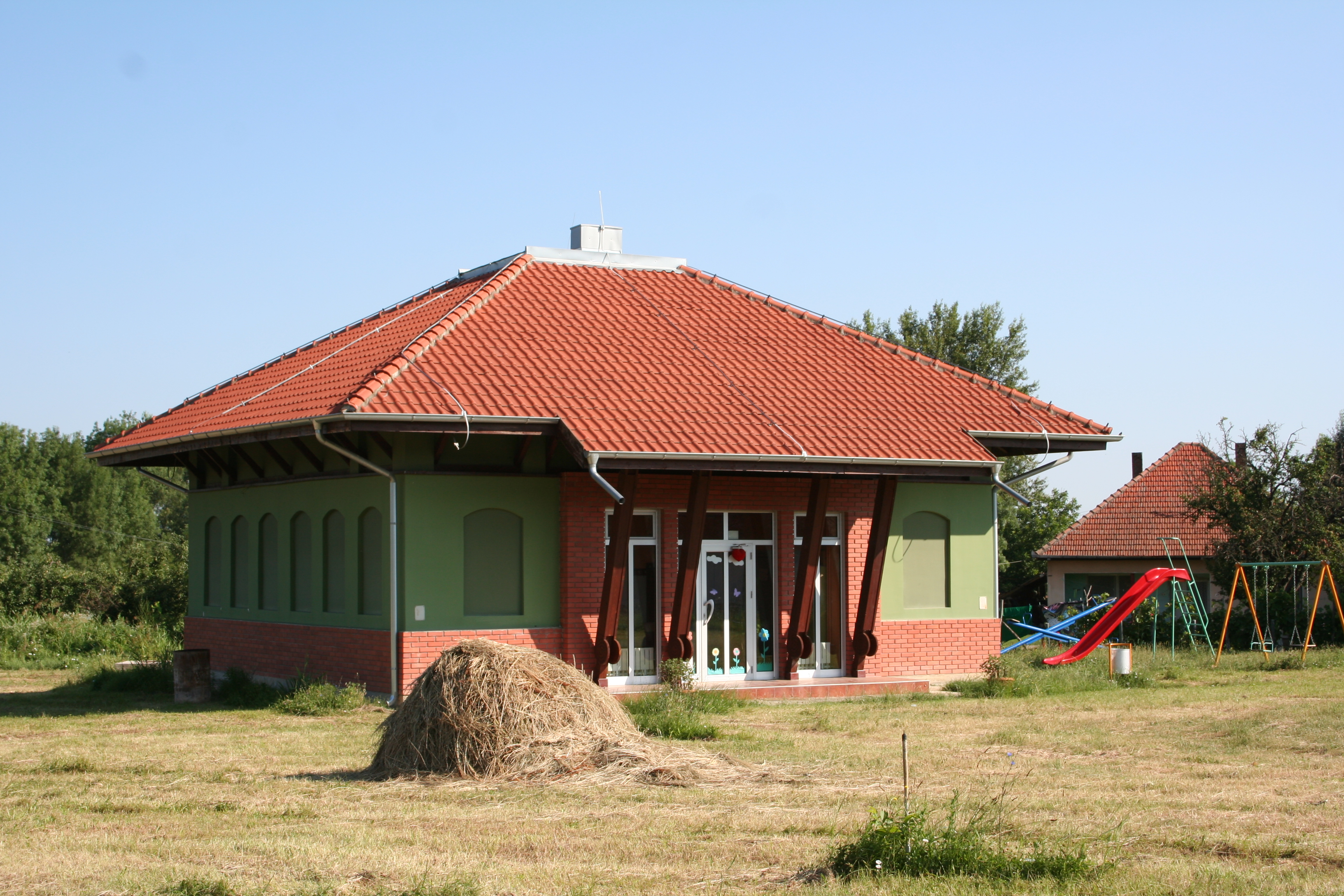

- Location within Serbia
- Coordinates: 44°42′16″N 19°49′48″E
- Country: Serbia
- District: Mačva District
- Municipality: Šabac

Population (2002)
  - Total: 406
- Time zone: UTC+1 (CET)
  - Summer (DST): UTC+2 (CEST)

Miokus (Serbian Cyrillic: Миокус) is a village in the municipality of Šabac, Serbia. According to the 2002 census, the village has a population of 406 people.
