= Vasilije Popović (revolutionary) =

Vasilije "Vasa" Popović (1775–1832) was a Serbian revolutionary. He became known as the "People's Prince" after the Second Serbian Uprising as the most reliable and most important informant of Prince Miloš Obrenović; the prince addressed him as "brother".

Popović was the brother of Princess Ljubica's maternal uncle.

Obrenović appointed him the obor-knez of the Požega nahiye in 1819, despite his lack of war experience. Vasa was an actor and creator of spy and diplomatic missions, a transmitter of dispatches and oral messages. He headed a group of Serbian spies in other countries. However, his significance and merit for the liberation of Serbia remained a secret; the truth about his fate and role emerged only before the 200th anniversary of the Second Serbian Uprising.

Aleksandar Marušić, "In the lists of champions of Miloš Obrenović's uprising from 1815, Vasa Popović is first mentioned as the scribe of master Jovan Obrenović (1786-1850) who was a brother of Miloš Obrenović, Master, Divisional General, and a Commander of Morava and Podrinje military district". Then he became one of Miloš Obrenović's three secret advisers. The uprising lasted only a few months. Diplomatic struggles, negotiations and agreements followed, first with the Turkish Marashli Ali Pasha and "Furthermore, all the way to the employees and emissaries of the then superpowers. The prince needed the most capable and loyal people for all that, and they, in addition to that diplomatic and intelligence activity, represented and exercised judicial and military power on his behalf in the domestic political field".

Marušić wrote several books on the Obrenović dynasty. He explained that the painting Takovo Uprising shows Popović's character. Folklore claims that Vasa and Miloš had ups and downs. He wrote letters to the prince in which he says that he served with both Obrenović rulers and knows "what kind of people they are". Unlike some Serbs who were Turkophiles or Austrophiles, he was among the majority leaning towards Imperial Russia.

He recruited merchants, travellers, ordinary people and priests as agents. He used a cane as a tool, now kept in the museum in Takovo. It is a two-part walking stick, with a built-in dagger. The lower part is a narrow cylinder in which Vasa carried confidential dispatches.

Popović corresponded with language reformer Vuk Karadžić.

He died on 17 January 1832 in Belgrade under mysterious circumstances, according to Milan Milićević in Pomenik znameniti ljudi u srpskoga naroda novijega doba. He was buried in the gate of the Belgrade church so that his remains could be transferred to Brezna near the church of which he was the founder. Vuk Karadžić openly blamed Miloš Obrenović for Vasa's death.
