= Ignatije Bjelić =

Ignatije Bjelić (Serbian Cyrillic: Игнатије Бјелић) was a subordinate to a famous voivode and military leader Stojan Čupić and rose to the rank of captain in the First Serbian Uprising.

== Biography ==
Ignatije Bjelić is a contemporary of Filip Višnjić, who wrote and recited (in song) a poem entitled "Ignatije Bjelić" that memorializes Ignatije among the many who participated in the Serbian Revolution.

Ignatije Bjelić is best remembered to have been in the delegation that signed an agreement with the Sublime Porte for the warring parties to keep the peace. Not too long after the signing, Ignatije Bjelić came to his commander Stojan Čupić to complain that "Turks are breaking faith, crossing the Drina river, killing Serbian soldier and stealing horses."

There are some scant references on him in English, however, he is prominently mentioned in Vuk Karadžić collection of popular epic poetry sung by Serbian guslars. Ignatije Bjelić was a captain in the army of Stojan Čupić who not only complained about the Turks constantly crossing the river Drina in the Serb-liberated territories, but took matters into his own hands when his leader Stojan Čupić gave him the go-ahead. Guslar Filip Višnjić composed and sang about the heroic deeds of Bjelić Ignatije, Čupić Stojan and Stanić Stanojlo and other ballads by other guslars while Vuk Karadžić collected them all and wrote down the lyrics for posterity in his collection of several tomes. Through the recollection of first hand witnesses of the Serbian Revolution, Karadźic was able to record the Karađorđe period from 1804 to 1813 in addition to the Second Serbian Uprising, led by Miloš Obrenović.

== Sources ==
- Milan Đ. Milićević, Pomenik znamenitih ljudi u srpskog narodu novijega doba, Vol 1 (Belgrade, 1888)
- Milan Đ. Milićević,Kneževina Srbija (Belgrade, 1878)
- Lazar Arsenijević Batalaka, Istorija srpskog ustanka (Belgrade, 1898)
- Konstantin N. Nenadović, Život i dela velikog Đorđa Petrovića Kara Đorđa Vrhovnog Vožda... (Vienna, 1884)
