= Vujica Vulićević =

Vujica Vulićević Вујица Вулићевић
- Born: c. 1773; Azanja (modern Serbia)
- Died: 11 March 1828 (aged 54–55); Gračac, Vrnjačka Banja
- Military career
- Allegiance: Revolutionary Serbia
- Service years: 1805–1815
- Conflicts: Deligrad

Vujica Vulićević also known as Vule Vulićević (Serbian Cyrillic: Вујица Вулићевић; c. 1773–1828) was a Serbian voivode (military commander) in the First Serbian Uprising of the Serbian Revolution, led by Grand Leader Karađorđe against the Ottoman Empire. He held the rank of Obor-knez. He was also the kum (godfather) of Karađorđe, but betrayed him on behalf of Miloš Obrenović, the rival prince.

== Life ==
=== Personal ===
Vujica was born in the village of Azanja, in Smederevska Palanka, then part of the Sanjak of Smederevo, an Ottoman province covering central Serbia. His eldest brother was voivode Đuša Vulićević, the district holder of Smederevo. His son, Petar, was married to the sister of Ljubica Vukomanović, the wife of Miloš Obrenović.

=== Revolution ===
He was part of the First Serbian Uprising since the start. Among his subordinates, was Đorđe Zagla.

In December 1806, voivodes Vujica, Mladen Milovanović and Stanoje Glavaš commanded an army of 18,000 soldiers to defend at the Battle of Deligrad. The fight ended in Serbian victory, with Ibrahim Bushati, pasha of Shkodër, signing a 6-week truce.

Together with voivode Čolak-Anta Simeonović, he led Karađorđe's offensive from Nikšić to Montenegro in May 1809.

After the murder of his brother Đuša, Vujica becomes Obor-knez, or holder of the Smederevo district.

He was sent by Miloš with Prota Mateja to negotiate with Marashli Ali Pasha in Ćuprija.

=== The murder of Karađorđe ===
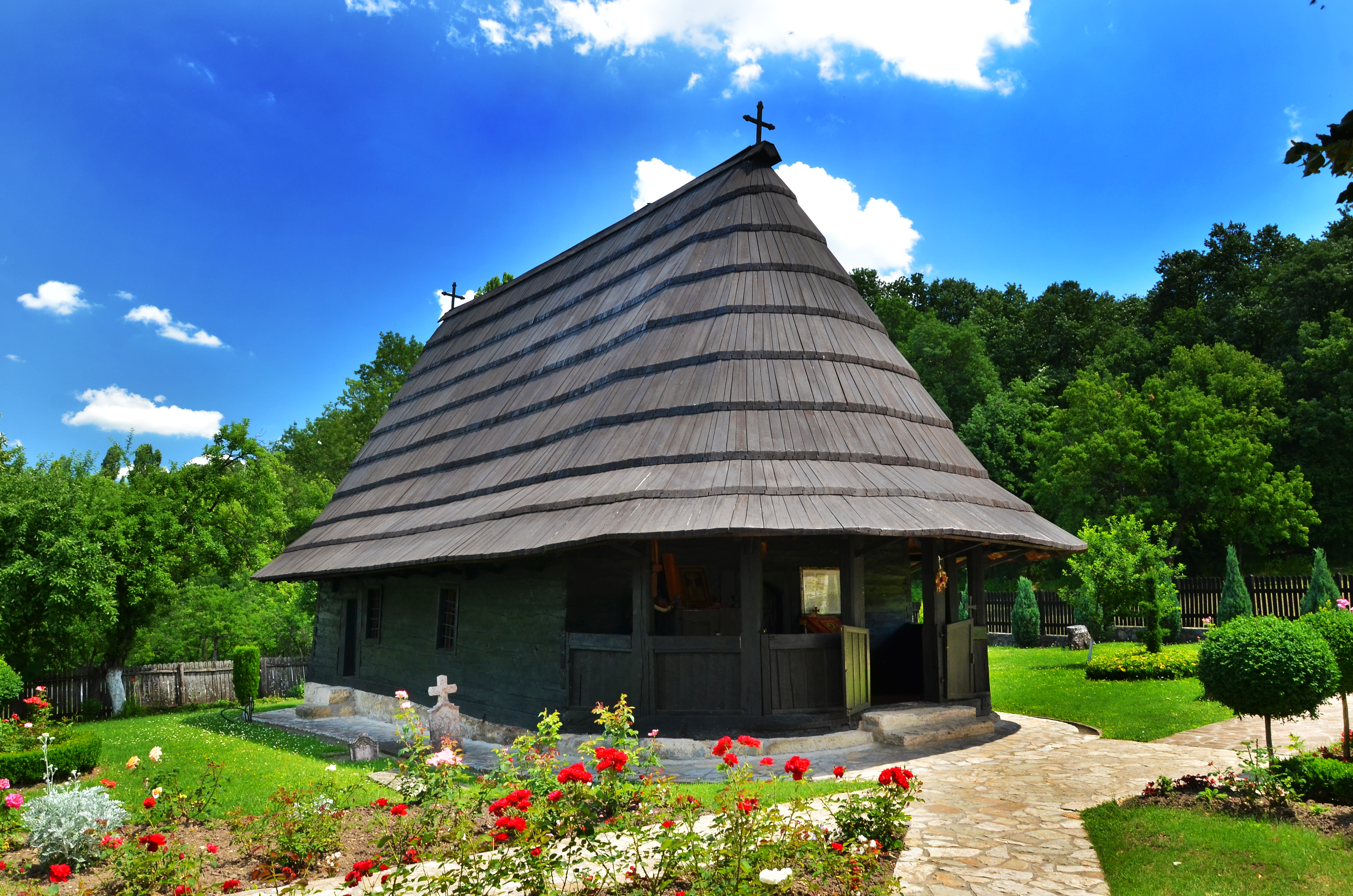
Pokajnica Monastery, founded by Vujica to Karađorđe.

In 1812, threatened by Napoleon's French Empire, Russia had to quickly sign a peace treaty with the Ottomans. In 1813, the Ottoman Empire launched a big assault on Serbia taking land all up to the rivers Morava and the river Drina, and Karađorđe, along with other rebel leaders, fled to the Austrian Empire on 21 September 1813. After some time, Karađorđe emigrated to Bessarabia, where he joined the Greek national liberation movement Filiki Eteria, where he became an active member. The Greeks were primarily interested in using the Serbian lands as base of the Greek operations. Miloš Obrenović was fully uncooperative.

On 25 July 1817, in the Radovanjski Lug forest, within reach of Velika Plana, Miloš Obrenović had Karađorđe killed, and although Vujica was his godfather, he helped in the arrangement and betrayed his godson. There also exist stories that Vujica himself killed Karađorđe, when he slept in his cabin, as a guest. Miloš had his head sent to the Sultan. In a sign of regret, he founded the Pokajnica Monastery (Repentance) wooden-church in 1818.

=== Later years ===
In 1821, he is appointed diplomat and sent to Constantinople (now Istanbul). In 1827, he returns to Serbia. He was given an Ottoman Kilij for his service.

== See also ==
- List of Serbian Revolutionaries

== Bibliography ==
- Matica Srpska, Biografija Archived 2012-03-30 at the Wayback Machine
- Stojan V. Živadinović, Vujica Vulićević, 1933
- Nebojša Damnjanović, Vladimir Merenik, The first Serbian uprising and the restoration of the Serbian state, Historical Museum of Serbia, Gallery of the Serbian Academy of Science and Arts, 2004
