= Cincar-Marko =

Serbian aristocrat and diplomat

Cincar Marko Kostić (1777 in Dolna Belica – 22 February 1822, in Šabac) was a Serbian aristocrat and diplomat. He served as vojvoda of Soko nahiye and duke of Šabac, and was one of the leaders of the First Serbian Insurrection.

== Early life ==
Cincar Marko was born in 1777 in Dolna Belica, near Struga, from father Konstantin “Kosta” after whom he took his surname. His cousin was Cincar Janko Popović.

Due to an uncertain incident with the Turks, Cincar Marko's family had to flee to north Serbia where they settled in Valjevo where they were engaged in trade.

== In the First Serbian Insurrection ==
Cincar Marko joined the uprising against Ottomans from its very start. He fought on the River Drina, stopping incursions from Bosnia. During the siege of Šabac he was at the head of bećari („lads“, men who still had no families). He took part in the Battle of Mišar (1806) and one of the battles around Loznica.

He was subordinate to Milan Obrenović, vojvoda of Rudnik, until Obrenović's death in 1810. Earlier that year Cincar Marko accompanied Milenko Stojković and Milan Obrenović to Bucharest, in a diplomatic mission to the Danube command of the Russian army.

During the Insurrection Cincar Marko bought several shops in Valjevo.

In July 1812 Cincar Marko became the vojvoda of Soko nahiye, which he defended during the Ottoman offensive in 1813.

== After the Insurrection ==
After the crushing of the insurrection in 1813, Cincar Marko fled with other Serbian leaders across the Sava River to the Habsburg Empire.

When the Second Serbian Uprising started in 1815, Cincar Marko returned to Serbia and took part in the Battle of Dublje in which he was wounded. After that he was sent by Miloš Obrenović, leader of the Uprising, to the Congress of Vienna to plead for Serbian autonomy.

That same year Miloš Obrenović made him the duke of Šabačka Posavina, with its center in the town of Šabac. This duty he performed until his death in 1822. He was buried in the old town cemetery.

== Family ==
Cincar Marko had two sons – Konstantin “Kosta” and Milan – and a daughter, Elena. All of them took the surname Cincar-Marković after their illustrious father. Cincar Marko's grandson was General Dimitrije Cincar-Marković (1849–1903), chief of staff of the Serbian army, the Prime Minister (1902/3), senator (member of the Upper House – Senat), and his great-grandson was dr Aleksandar Cincar-Marković (1889–1947), diplomat and cabinet minister in interwar Yugoslavia.
