= Cincar-Janko =

Serbian uprising leader

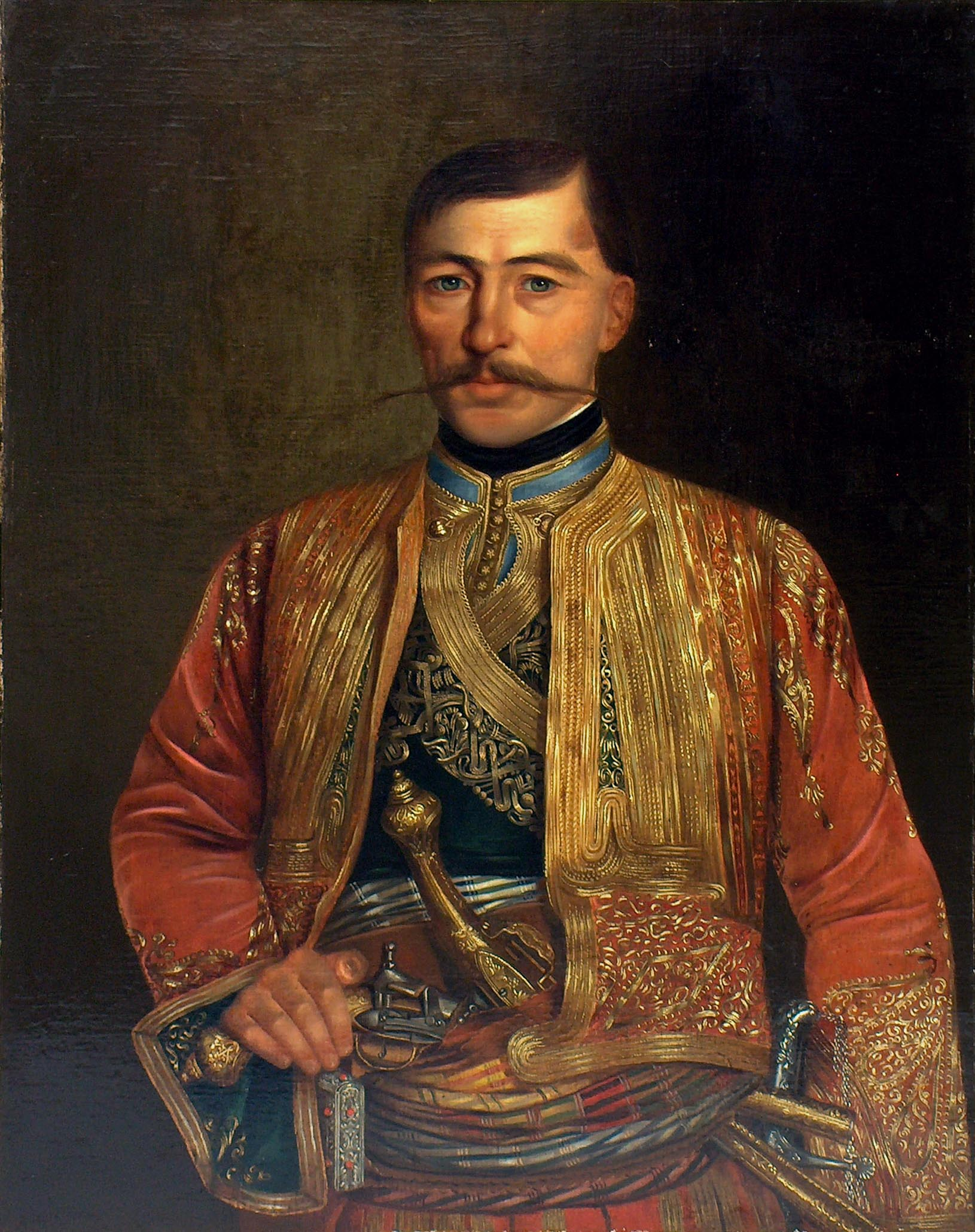
Portrait by Uroš Knežević.

Janko Popović (Serbian Cyrillic: Јанко Поповић; 1779–1833), nicknamed Cincar Janko (Цинцар Јанко), was a Serbian vojvoda, one of the most prominent leaders of the First Serbian Uprising.

== Early life ==
Janko was born in 1779 in Ohrid, in a family of priests. His father came from the Aromanian village of Dolna Belica, where his cousin Cincar Marko Kostić, another leader in the Serbian Uprising was born. After he had murdered a certain Turk, Janko fled northwards and around the year 1800 and settled in Valjevo where he lived as a tradesman. His nickname was Cincar ("Aromanian"), because of his roots.

== Serbian Uprising (1804-1813) ==
When the outlawed janissaries from Belgrade decided to preemptively murder all the important Serbs in the district they controlled, Popović was also imprisoned, but was in the end released due to the pleading of many citizens of Valjevo.

Having lived through this ordeal, Popović joined the insurrection immediately. From 1804 until 1811 he fought against the Turks mostly on Drina River. He took part in the taking of Karanovac (nowadays Kraljevo) in 1805, battle of Lješnica (1806) and the battle of Čučuge (1806). He was appointed to be the commander of bećari, unmarried men or Serbs from out of Serbia, who – unlike the rest of the peasant army which was not too keen of leaving their villages for too long – were the most mobile part of the insurrectionist army.

Cincar Janko distinguished himself in the battle of Mišar (1806) and in the consequent pursuing of the defeated Bosnian army during which he even crossed into the Habsburg Empire to attack those who sought refuge there. Because of this incident, the Austrians will continue pressing for his trial. In late 1806 he took part in the liberation of Belgrade. In 1807 he was at the head of the Šabac garrison and fought in the skirmished on River Drina.

In 1809 he is given the title of vojvoda (“duke”) and is commanding troops that crossed into Bosnia. In 1810 Popović was wounded in the battle of Tičar, near Loznica.

He was famous for taking part in duels that took place before the battle would start.

During the Uprising Cincar Janko continued, as much as he could, with trade. He also bought himself a house in Belgrade.

In the conflict between the supreme commander Karadjordje and some of the leaders of the Insurrection, Cincar Janko took Karadjordje’s side. Cincar Janko became vojvode of the County of Požarevac. He remained on this position until the end of the Uprising.

During the 1813 Ottoman offensive Cincar Janko was defending Deligrad on the southern front but had to retreat, first to Požarevac and then to Belgrade, where from he crossed to the Habsburg Empire.

== Life in Russia (1813-1830) ==
Because of the 1809 border incident Cincar Janko was now put to trial and imprisoned in Arad. Upon the insisting of the Russian Emperor he was released and joined the other leaders of the Insurrection in Russia. Like many of them, Cincar Janko lived in Hotin (today in Ukraine) until 1830. His sons got educated as officers of the Russian army in which they started their career but later returned to Serbia with their father.

== Return to Serbia and Death (1830-1833) ==
After the Sultan had granted Serbia autonomy, Prince of Serbia Miloš Obrenović, allowed most of the exiled vojvodas to return. Cincar Janko did so and settled in Šabac. In 1833 he got sick; on his way to the Sokobanja spa he stopped at Ravanica Monastery where he died.

Popović was a brave man and an able leader. All of his life he remained a devout Orthodox Christian. He helped several churches in Serbia and in the Habsburg Empire. He is mentioned in many epic folk songs as well as in Sima Milutinović Sarajlija’s epic Serbijanka.

His descendants took the surname Cincar-Janković and were an eminent Belgrade family.
