= Kozare (Leskovac) =

- Village
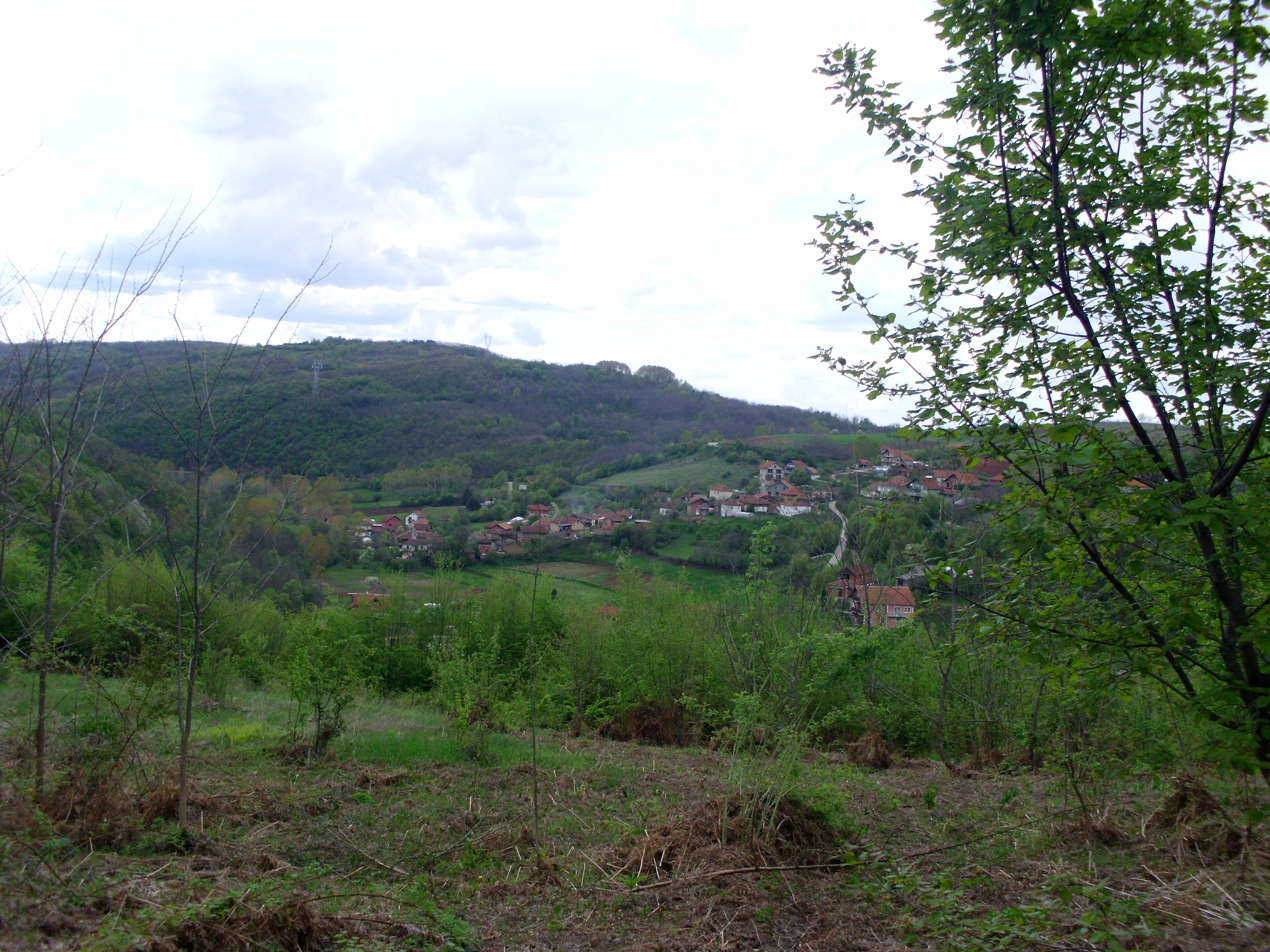
- General view of Kozare

- Location within Serbia
- Coordinates: 42°55′47″N 22°05′44″E
- Country: Serbia
- District: Jablanica District
- Municipality: Leskovac

Population (2011)
  - Total: 301
- Time zone: UTC+1 (CET)
  - Summer (DST): UTC+2 (CEST)

Kozare is a village in the municipality of Leskovac, Serbia. According to the 2011 census, the village has a population of 301 people, down from 362 in 2002.
