= Dolna Belica =

Dolna Belica Долна Белица Belicë e Poshtme
- Village
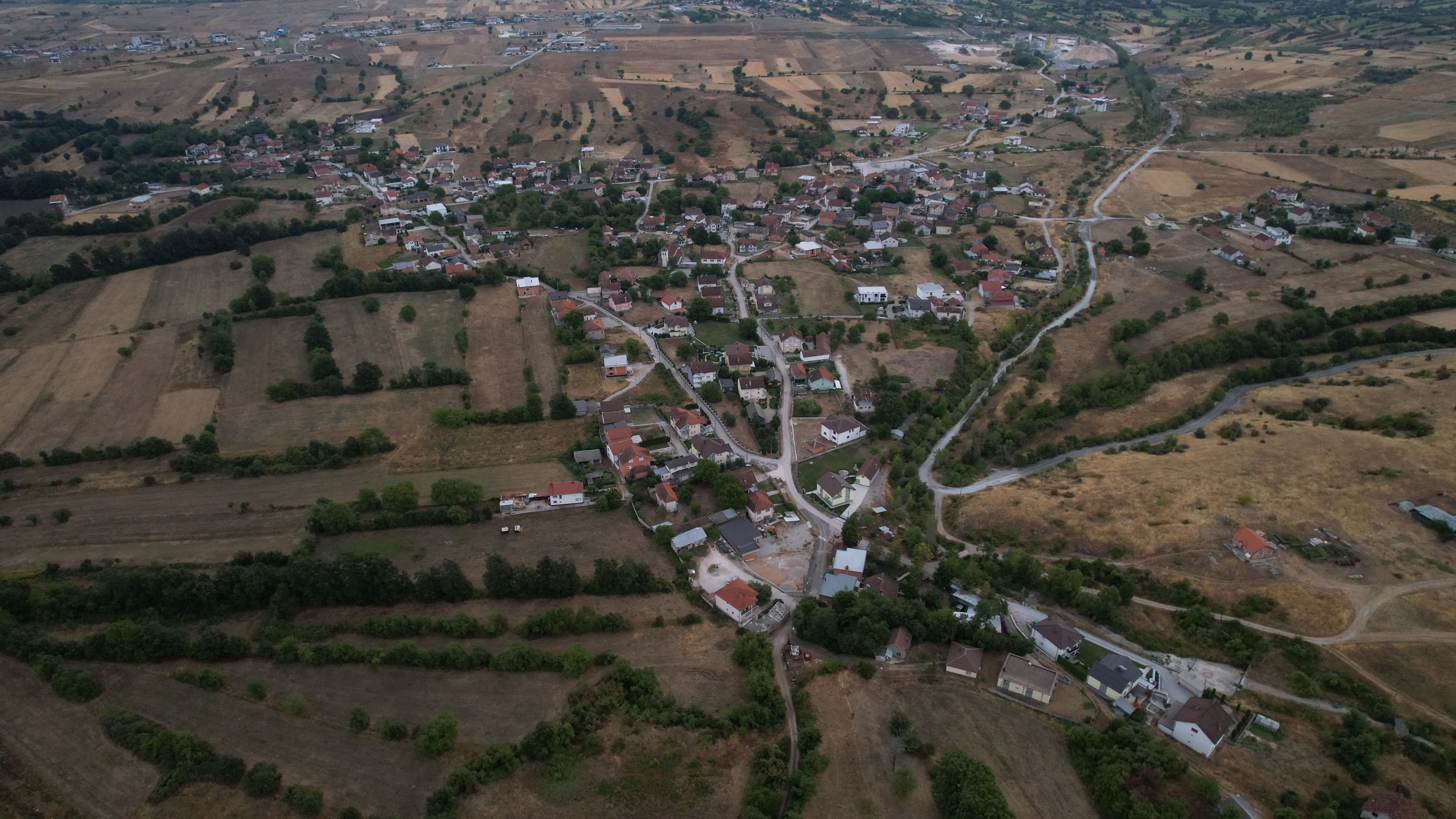
- Air view of the village

- Location within North Macedonia
- Coordinates: 41°12′47″N 20°38′06″E
- Country: North Macedonia
- Region: Southwestern
- Municipality: Struga
- Elevation: 702 m (2,303 ft)

Population (2021)
  - Total: 660
- Time zone: UTC+1 (CET)
  - Summer (DST): UTC+2 (CEST)
- Area code: +38946
- Car plates: SU
- Website: .

Dolna Belica (Macedonian: Долна Белица; Albanian: Belicë e Poshtme) is a village in the municipality of Struga, North Macedonia.

== Name ==
The village is known as Beala di Ghios or Beala di Cămpu in Aromanian.

== History ==
The village appears in the 1467 Ottoman defter. The majority of the inhabitants displayed a majority Albanian or mixed Slavic-Albanian anthroponomy, while a minority had Slavic names. with the following household heads:Tole Gonçe; Dimitri Babeol; Erin Niko; Gon Shimjat; Gjore S-u-ç; Gin Mamin; Gon Kovaç; Gon Damjan; Gerg (or Kirk) Dobre; Milosh Prokop; Netko, son of Bajçin; Radiç Novak; Gon Kosar; Gjorgo Popoviq; Gon Ivrain. According to a local tradition Dolna Belica was founded on the foothills near Mount Jablanica by Aromanians from the villages of Niçë and Llëngë, fleeing the 18th century socio-political and economic crises in what is now southern Albania. Close family relations were maintained through intermarriage between Aromanians from Dolna Belica and those of Niçë and Llëngë. During the First World War, Gorna Belica was occupied by the Bulgarian military who evacuated most of the Aromanian villagers and sent them into the interior of Bulgaria and Serbia. The relocation of local Aromanians was due to Bulgarian forces being concerned that pro-Greek and pro-Serbian sympathies existed among them resulting in possible cooperation with the Entente Allies. While in exile, some villagers had to fend for themselves whereas others for the Bulgarians did forced labour. Some Aromanians returning to Dolna Belica through Thessaloniki, Greece attempted to stay in that country and settle there though Greek authorities turned down their requests.

== Demographics ==
Dolna Belica, along with Gorna Belica, is one of two traditional settlements located in the Drimkol region within Struga municipality which has historically been inhabited by an Aromanian and Albanian community. The village over time has undergone a change in its ethnic composition of the population. Dolna Belica has become a mostly Albanian speaking settlement. Aromanian Muslims also existed in Dolna Belica, although they have assimilated into Albanian identity and language.

In statistics gathered by Vasil Kanchov in 1900, the village of Dolna Belica was inhabited by 650 Aromanians and 50 Muslim Albanians. The Yugoslav census of 1948 recorded 692 people of whom 175 were Albanians, 8 Macedonians and 509 others. The Yugoslav census of 1953 recorded 669 people of whom 208 were Albanians, 27 Macedonians, 9 Romani, and 425 others. The 1961 Yugoslav census recorded 659 people of whom 251 were Albanians, 50 Macedonians, 2 Bosniaks, 1 Turk, and 355 others. The 1971 census recorded 687 people of whom 478 were Albanians, 52 Macedonians, 5 Turks and 152 others. The 1981 Yugoslav census recorded 808 people of whom 627 were Albanians, 68 Macedonians, 15 Bosniaks, and 98 others. The Macedonian census of 1994 recorded 894 people of whom 779 were Albanians, 36 Macedonians, 6 Turks, and 73 others.

According to the 2002 census, the village had a total of 1026 inhabitants. Ethnic groups in the village include:

- Albanians 945
- Vlachs 24
- Macedonians 17
- Turks 1
- Serbs 1
- Others 38

As of the 2021 census, Dolna Belica had 660residents with the following ethnic composition:

- Albanians 604
- Others 31
- Persons for whom data are taken from administrative sources 18
- Vlachs 5
- Macedonians 2
