= Vuča Žikić =

Vuča Žikić (Serbian Cyrillic: Вуча Жикић, mid-18th century – 14 April 1808), known as Captain Žika, was an important figure in the First Serbian Uprising. He was the founder, builder and commander of Deligrad fortification.

== Life ==
As a young man Žikić left his native Mavrovo and came to Belgrade where he worked as an innkeeper and a sheep herdsman. Already in 1787, he was conspiring with Austrian spies to open the gates of the Water Gate of Belgrade Fortress to Austrian soldiers. In the Austrian-Ottoman war of 1788-1791 he joined the Serbian Free Corps unit of Mihaljević and distinguished himself earning the rank of captain. After the war he escaped to Srem and lived in the village of Boljevci. He later took part in the Austrian-French war.

Despite the fact that he built his career in Austrian service, after the start of the First Serbian Uprising in 1804, Žikić immediately returned to Serbia. He is credited for establishing the Deligrad fortification (together with Petar Dobrnjac, his commander), in 1806. As an experienced officer with some talent for building, Žikić turned Deligrad into the strongest defensive point in the Morava valley. Žikić is also supposed to have given it the name. He commanded the troops stationed in the fortification, mostly from Niš and Leskovac until his death

On Easter Friday in 1808 the Turks launched a sneak attack on Deligrad. The attack was repulsed but Žikić was mortally wounded. He was taken to the nearby Monastery of St. Roman where he died on Easter Day. That is also where he was buried.

His position in Deligrad was taken by his nephew Kuzman, son of his brother Anko.

== Family ==
Žikić married twice. From his first marriage he had three sons – Ilija, Anko and Miloš. From the second one he had sons Vučo and Damijan.

== Annotations ==
1. His name has been variously spelled as Velčo, Vlčo, Vuča, Vuče, while his last name appears as Žikić, Džikić, Džigić, Djikić, Džika, and Žika.

== See also ==
- List of Serbian Revolutionaries

== Sources ==
- M. Đ. Milićević (1888). "Pomenik znamenitih ljudi u srpskoga narod novijega doba". Beograd.
- Gavrilović, Andra (1904). "Жика Капетан". Црте из историје ослобођења Србије. Belgrade: Нздање дворске књпжаре Мпте Стајпћа у Београду. pp. 95–101. (Public Domain)
- Marko Atlagić (2004). "Карађорђе и Цинцари". Пешчаник год. 2, бр. 2 (2004), стр. 111-117. Историјски архив Ниш. Archived from the original on September 28, 2013.
