= Assemblies of the Serbian Revolution =

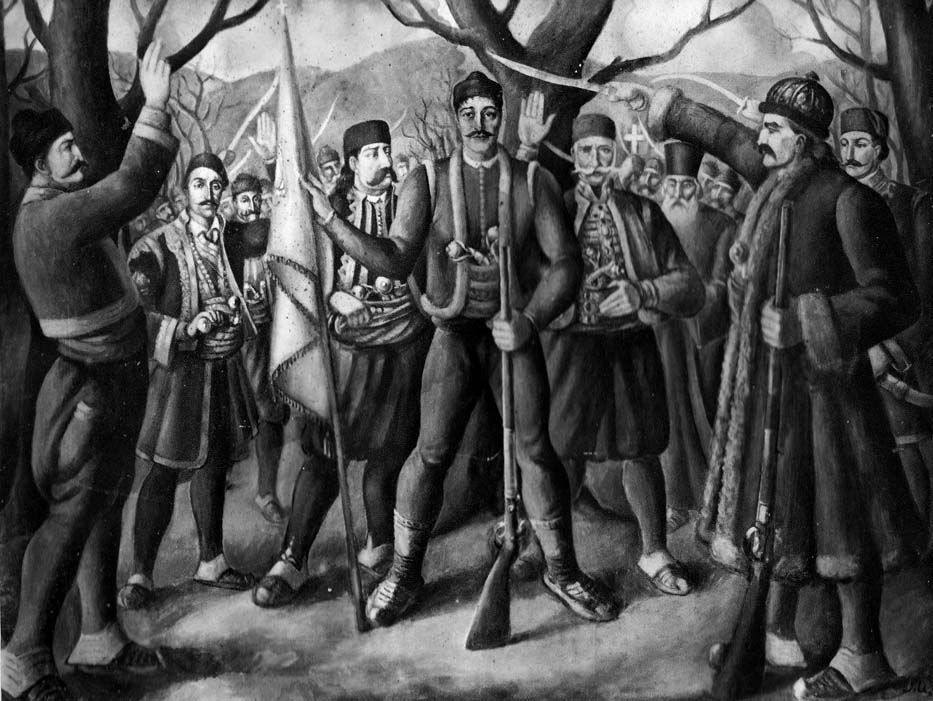
A depiction of a rebel assembly with Karađorđe surrounded by commanders.

There were various types of assemblies (Serbian: скупштине/skupštine) and meetings (зборови/zborovi) in Revolutionary Serbia during the First Serbian Uprising (1804–13). While the Serbian Governing Council represented the supreme state administration, the Assembly of Rebel Leaders represented the law-making political power, and Karađorđe the supreme commander. They various types of assemblies thus include:

- Assembly of Rebel Leaders (Скупштина устаничких старешина), included notables not only with the title vojvoda, but those ranked knez and obor-knez (part of civilian administration), and clergy (monks and protojerej), and from the military also captains. Examples of such assemblies are Pećani (1805) and Smederevo (1805).
- People's Assembly or National Assembly (народне скупштине)
- Secret Assembly (чрезвичајне), secret meetings such as at Palanka (1809).

== List ==
The following assemblies were held between 1804 and 1815:

Assembly	Date	Location	Notes
Orašac Assembly	14 February [O.S. 2 February] 1804 (Presentation of Jesus)	Orašac (at Marićevića jaruga) in Šumadija	Gathering of Serb notables of the Belgrade and Kragujevac nahiyas, unanimous decision made for uprising in the Belgrade Pashalik against the Dahije and election of Karađorđe to lead.
Brankovina Assembly	15 February [O.S. 3 February] 1804	Brankovina	Gathering of Valjevo nahiya Serbs to rise up against the Dahije.
Ostružnica Assembly	6 May–15 May [O.S. 24 April–3 May] 1804	Ostružnica outside Belgrade	Regarding establishment of judicial courts and appointment of judges; mustering of 25,000 to attack the Dahije at Belgrade; loan of 50,000 groschen in Zemun for war necessities, payment of merchants' vouching of ammunition and other necessities; demands in negotiations with the Dahije in Zemun and choosing of delegation to send there; the complete encirclement of Belgrade.
Pećani Assembly	29 April [O.S. 17 April] 1805	Pećani outside Belgrade	Regarding news of the return of the diplomatic mission to Russia, sending Serbian delegation to the Porte, division of taxes and costs of the uprising to date.
Borak Assembly	27 August [O.S. 15 August] 1805)	Veliki Borak	Regarding tribute, armament, military compensation, organization of political and legal power, repair of churches and monasteries, post office, etc. It was at first planned to hold an assembly at the Bogovađa monastery but the gathered instead went to Borak. Led to establishment of the Governing Council.
Smederevo Assembly	25–30 November 1805	Smederevo	Regarding no tribute to be paid the Porte; taxes collected from both Serbs and Turks for the Serbian Army; expansion of Army personnel, improvement of trenches and camps and strict military discipline, all military affairs put under Karađorđe, feeding of soldiers, desertion punishable by death; repair and expansion of Smederevo Fortress to house a garrison of 4–5,000; acceleration of siege of Belgrade and if no surrender take it through assault; if Turks attack, have good defensive points outside the Belgrade Pashalik.
Minor Assembly at Ostružnica	1–12 January 1806	Ostružnica outside Belgrade	
Smederevo Assembly	1 July 1806	Smederevo	
Smederevo Assembly	1–5 November 1806	Smederevo	Regarding the Porte's conditions for peace and delegation to Constantinople; giving thanks for appointment of "Hasanaga" as muhasil; continuation of war; acceleration of takeover of Belgrade; ask Habsburgs that their Frontier stop feeding the kırcalı; ask all Serbs, wherever they are, to aid in food and money; taxation.
Belgrade Assembly	24 February–6 March 1807	Belgrade	Regarding refusal of Porte's conditions for peace; Serbian-Russian military alliance against the Ottoman Empire, concentration of operations in eastern Serbia in support of Ivan Mikhelson, appointment of Milenko Stojković as main commander in the east, Karađorđe to pay attention to the east, military plans including Veljko Petrović, Petar Dobrnjac, Jakov Nenadović, Luka Lazarević, Sima Marković, Antonije Pljakić, Milan Obrenović and Lazar Mutap; reparations of Belgrade walls, establish arsenal in lower town, cannon foundry, weapons factory, forge; send deputies Čardaklija, Avram Lukić and Jeremija Gagić to Mikhelson; taxation.
Belgrade Assembly	21 November 1807	Belgrade	
Belgrade Assembly	14–15 December 1808	Belgrade	Regarding proclamation of Karađorđe as the supreme leader for the third time, with hereditary rule, to rule Serbia in agreement with the Governing Council, that is the supreme national court in all of the country.
Belgrade Assembly	1809	Belgrade	
Palanka Assembly	2–8 October 1809	Smederevska Palanka	secret assembly regarding need for Russian troops in Serbia to secure survival; the negative feelings for Rodofinikin and his intrigue, and that he nor Metropolitan Leontius or Serbs who were with them ever be allowed back to Serbia; the appointment of archimandrite and commander Melentije Stefanović as the hierarch of Serbia in place of fleeing Leontius; ask for Russian commission to investigate Serbian accusations against Rodofinikin; to send a delegation of three to Wallachia to inform the Russian Command of all this.
Belgrade Assembly	1–2 January 1810	Belgrade	Confirmation of points of the Palanka Assembly, need of Russian troops, taxation, President of Governing Council Mladen Milovanović removed and replaced by Jakov Nenadović.
Belgrade Assembly	13 May 1810	Belgrade	
Vraćevšnica Assembly	6 September 1810	Vraćevšnica	
Loznica Assembly	October 1810	Loznica	
Belgrade Assembly	1–12 January 1811	Belgrade	Regarding establishment of Government with Ministries of Internal Affairs (Jakov Nenadović), Law (Petar Dobrnjac), External Affairs (Milenko Stojković), Finance (Sima Marković), Education (Dositej Obradović) and Military (Mladen Milovanović). Karađorđe is President of Council and has veto power, but is unable to remove ministers, advisors and officials without any guilt. Great Court established.
Topola Assembly	17 July 1812	Topola	Regarding the refusal to alone deal with the Porte and of giving over cities to the Turks as per Treaty of Bucharest (1812), accept tribute to the Porte but refuse that Serbs and Turks live together; ask the Russian army to stay in Serbia and that Russia sends ammunition; send Interior Minister Jakov Nenadović to the Russian Command to inform of all this.
Vraćevšnica Assembly	15–16 August 1812	Vraćevšnica	Regarding thanks to the Russian emperor and continuation of talks with Ottoman deputy Mustafa Çelebi.
Kragujevac Assembly	1–12 January 1813	Kragujevac	Regarding Serbian borders; Karađorđe affirmed as supreme leader; Ottoman firman to establish an independent internal administration of Serbia; a Pasha or Vizier to be accepted in Belgrade as proof of loyal subjection; a promise of military support to the enemies of the Ottoman Empire; Serbs to protect Imperial cities. After this, the uprising was quelled and Ottoman rule returned to Serbia.
Topčider Meeting	8 August 1814	Topčider outside Belgrade	Miloš Obrenović, Milić Drinčić, Radovan Grbović, Aksentije Miladinović, Lazar Mutap, Arsenije Loma, Vasilije Jovanović, Panta Ilić, Milivoje Tadić, Vasilije Pavlović, Georgije Lazarević and others meet and send a letter to the Serbian revolutionary exiles to ask Russia for help regarding atrocities in Serbia.
Rudovci Meeting	late February 1815	Rudovci	leaders from Belgrade, Valjevo and Rudnik nahiyas meet regarding a new uprising.
Vreoci Meeting	5 March 1815	Vreoci	leaders from Belgrade, Valjevo and Rudnik nahiyas meet regarding a new uprising. Nikola Stanković sent to general Chervenka in Zemun to ask for Austrian aid, Pavle Gošnjić sent to Ostružnica to talk with emigrants in Vojvodina.
Rudovci Meeting	19 April [O.S. 7 April] 1815	Rudovci	leaders meet at the house of priest Ranko and decide that Miloš Obrenović lead the uprising. Armed conflict began the next day.
Takovo Meeting	23 April [O.S. 11 April] 1815 (Palm Sunday)	Takovo	official decision made for uprising and choosing of Miloš Obrenović as leader.

Rebel Assemblies in art

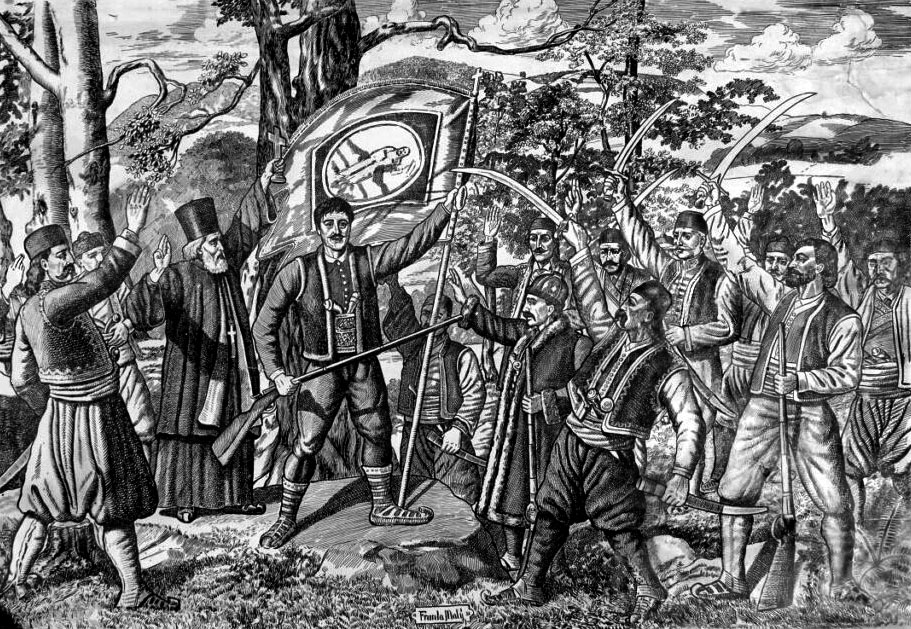
The First Serbian Uprising by Franta Mali.

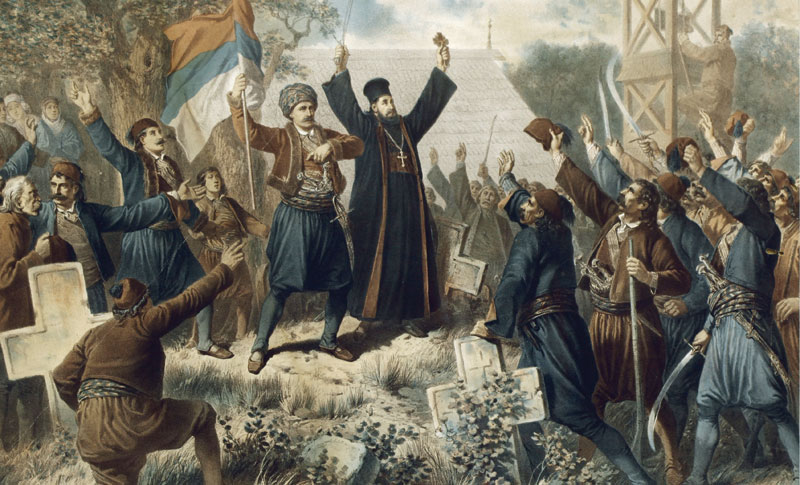
The Takovo Uprising by Vinzenz Katzler (1882).

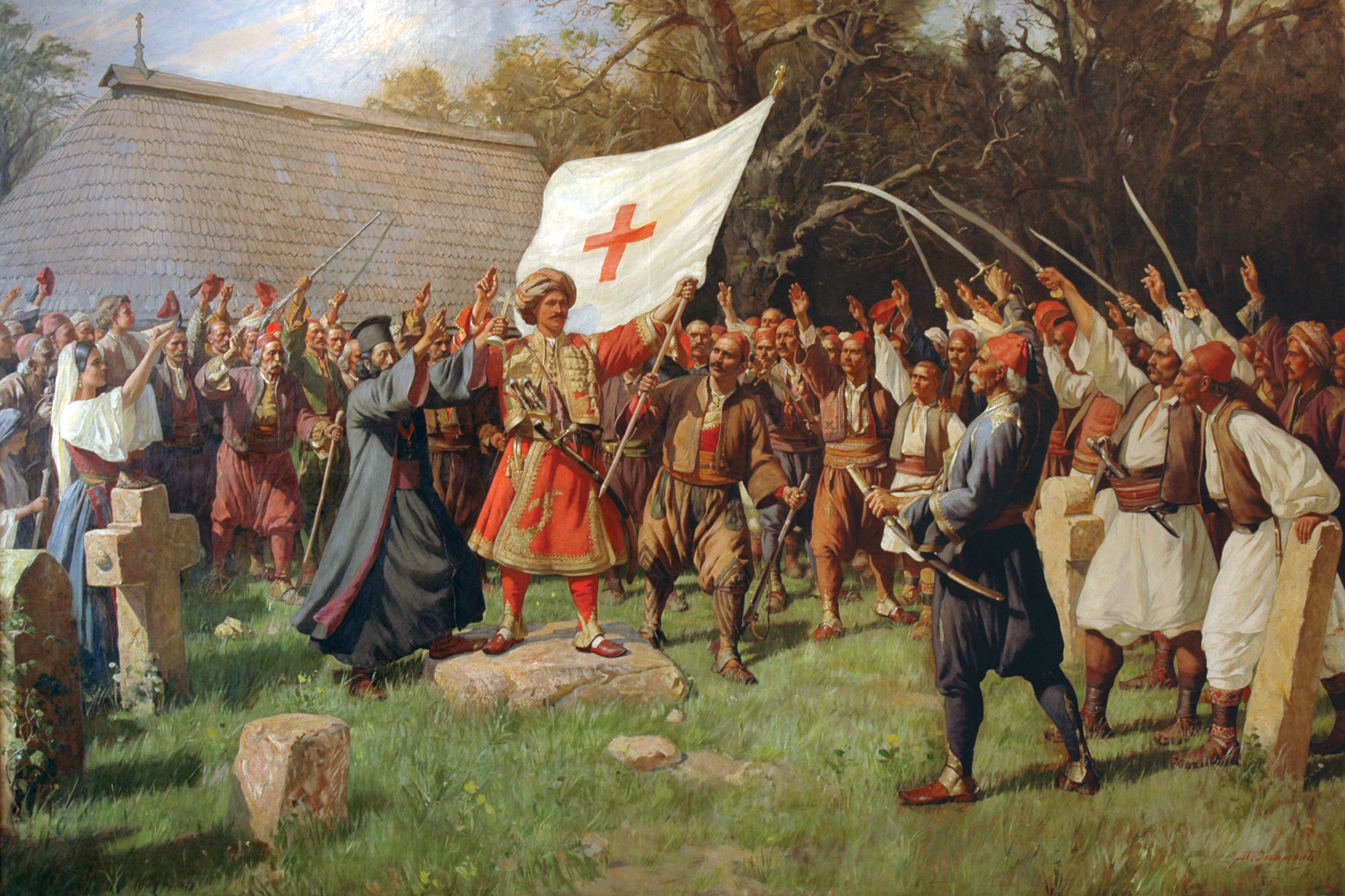
The Takovo Uprising by Paja Jovanović (1889), Takovo Museum.

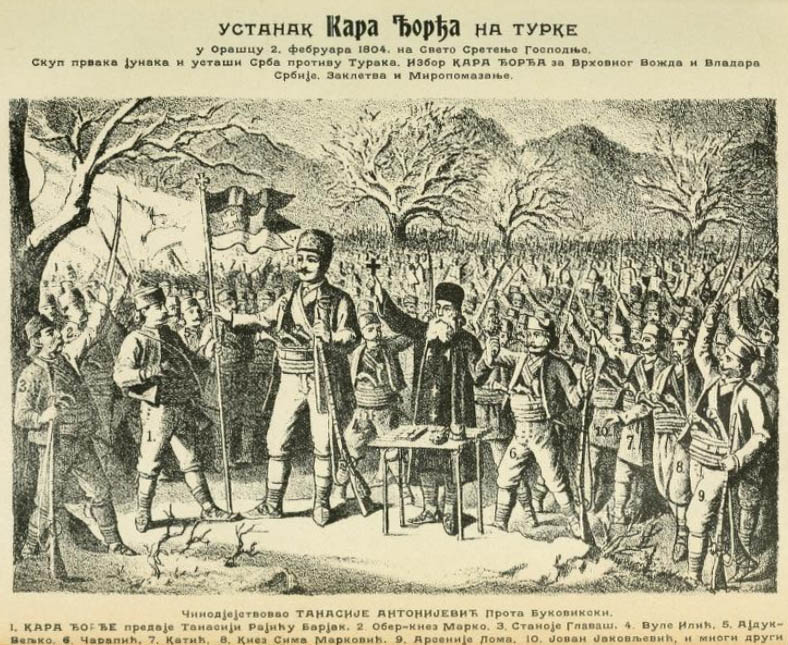
Illustration of the Orašac Assembly from Život i dela Kara-Đorđa (1903).

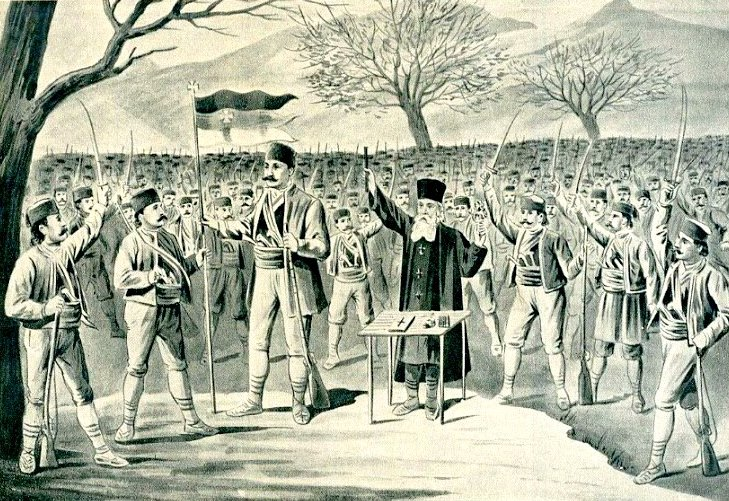
Illustration of the Orašac Assembly

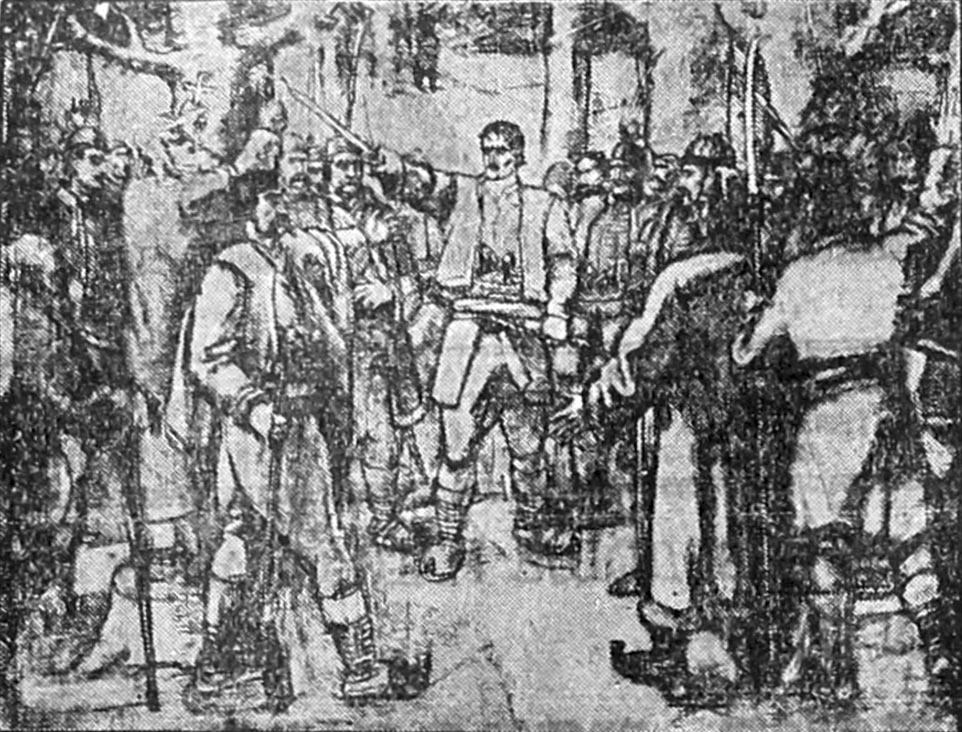
Illustration of the Orašac Assembly in Pravda (1934).

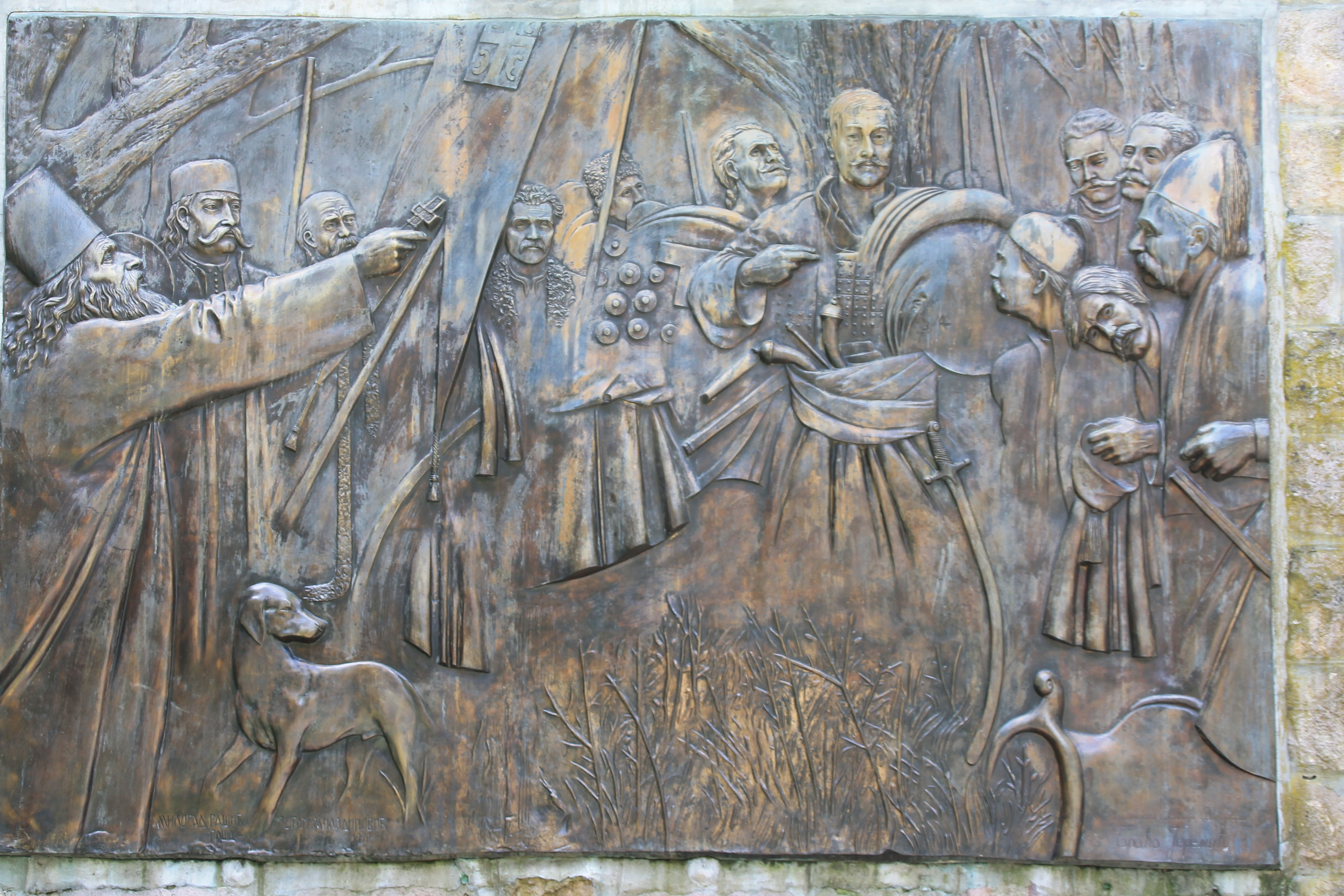
Motif at the memorial at Orašac

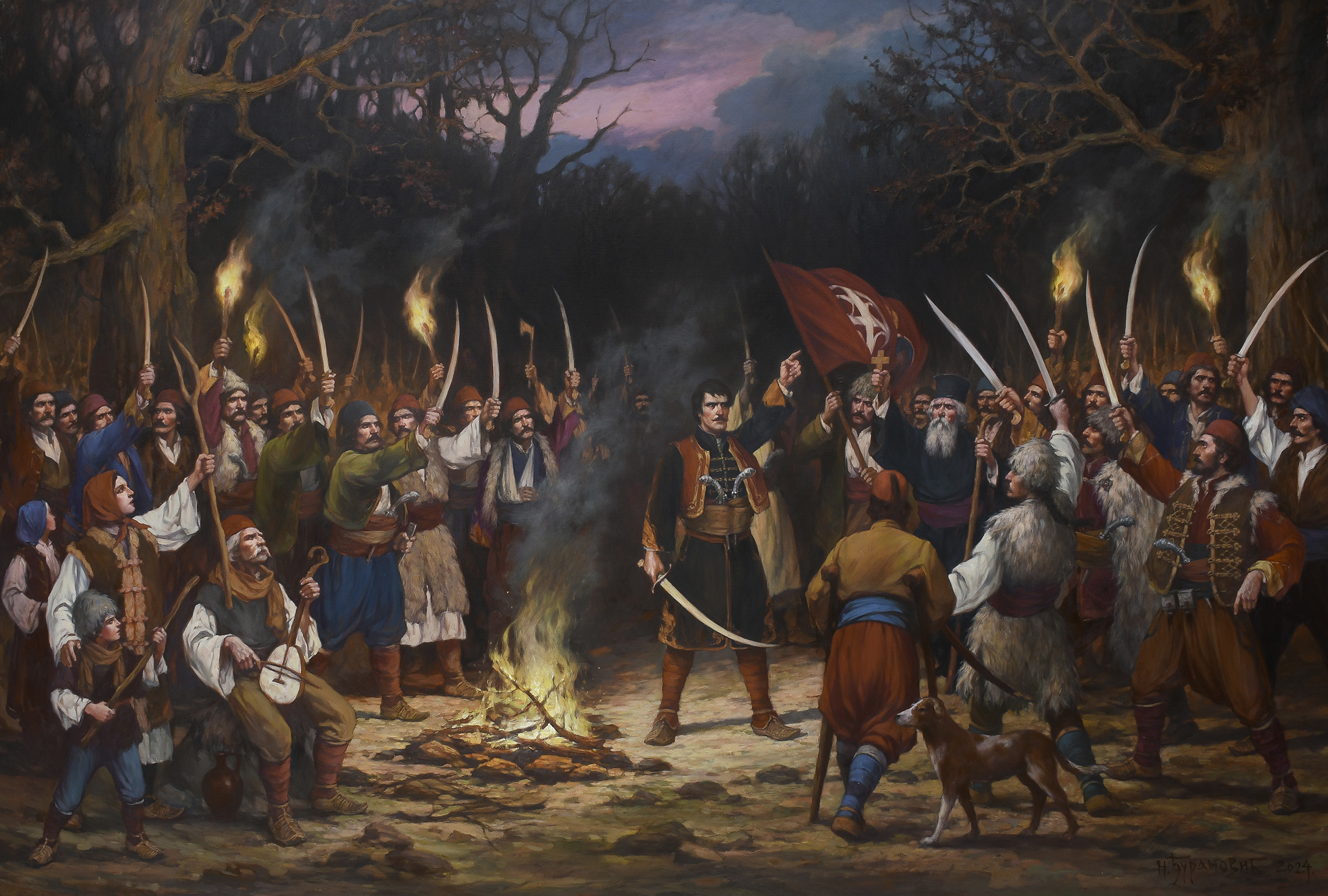
The First Serbian Uprising by Nebojša Đuranović

== See also ==
- Serbian Army (revolutionary)
- Timeline of the Serbian Revolution
- List of Serbian Revolutionaries

== Sources ==
- Batalaka, Lazar Arsenijević (1898). Историја српског устанка, део први [History of the Serbian Uprising: Part One]. Vol. I. Izd. Batalakinoga fonda – via Google Books.
- Batalaka, Lazar Arsenijević (1899). Историја српског устанка, део други [History of the Serbian Uprising: Part Two]. Vol. II. Izd. Batalakinoga fonda – via Google Books.
- Mitrinović, Čedomil; Brašić, Miloš (1937). Југословенске народне скупштине и сабори [Yugoslav national assemblies and councils]. Изд. Народне скупштине.
- Perović, Dušan (1976). "Osnovni ciljevi prvog ustanka". Историјски часопис. 23. Istorijski institut: 51-.
- Protić, Kosta (1893). "Ратни догађаји из првога српског устанка под Карађорђем Петровићем 1804—1813". Годишњица Николе Чупића. XIII. Državna štamparija.
