= Church of St. George, Takovo =

Eastern Orthodox church in Serbia

Church of St. George in Takovo
- Црква Светог Ђорђа у Такову
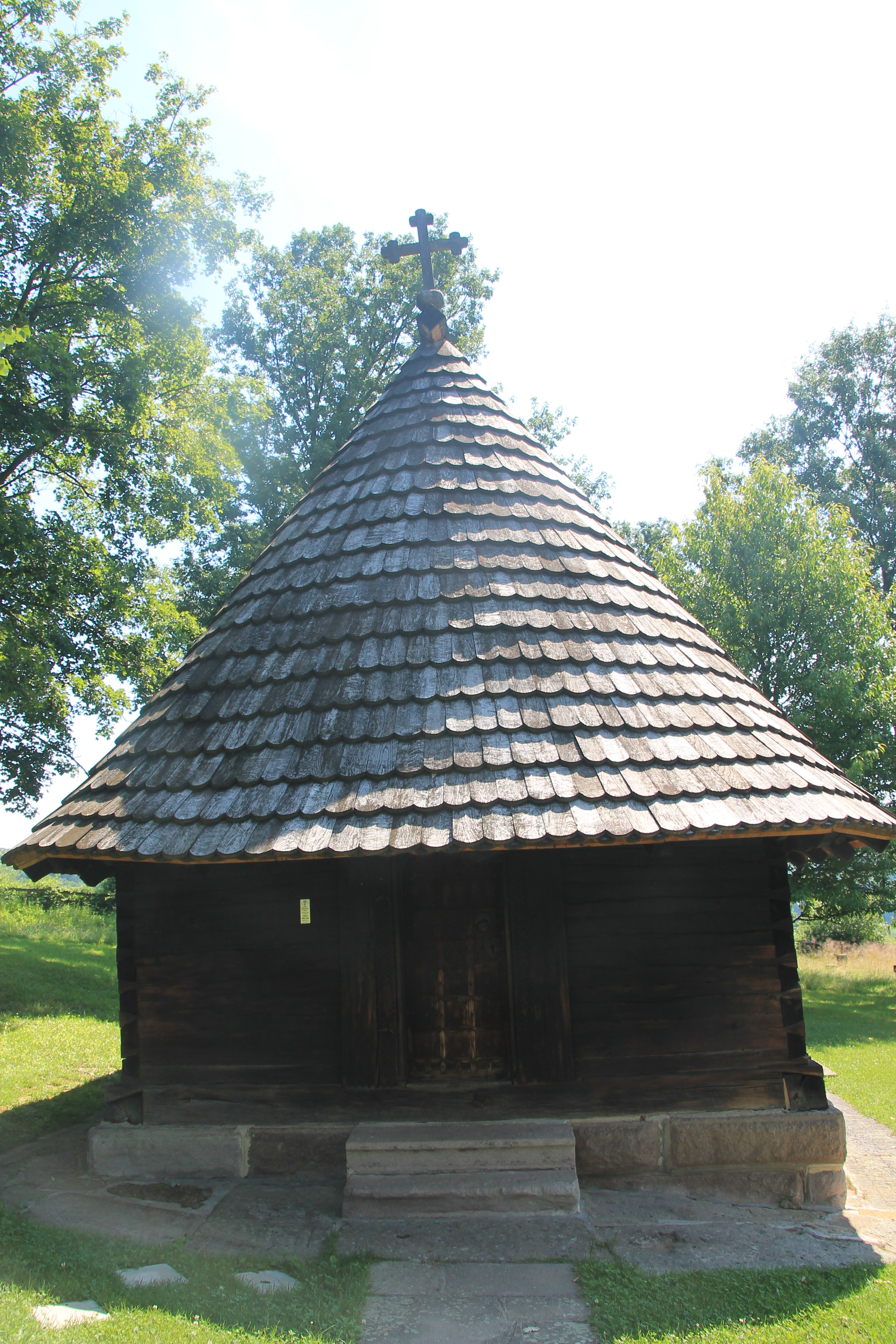
- The Church of St. George in Takovo, 2019

- Location within Serbia

Religion
- Affiliation: Serbian Orthodox Church
- Province: Eparchy of Žiča
- Rite: Byzantine Rite
- Ownership: Serbian Orthodox Church
- Leadership: Institute for Cultural Heritage Preservation Kraljevo
- Patron: Saint George

Location
- Location: Takovo, Moravica District
- Municipality: Gornji Milanovac
- Country: Serbia
- Interactive map of Church of St. George in Takovo
- Coordinates: 44°02′50″N 20°23′22″E

Architecture
- Architects: Master craftsmen from Osat, eastern Bosnia
- Type: Wooden church
- Style: Vernacular architecture
- Completed: 1795; 231 years ago
- Materials: Oak, stone
- Cultural Heritage of Serbia
- Type: Monument of Culture of Exceptional Importance
- Designated: 28 June 1983
- Reference no.: SK 502

Website
- Official website

The Church of St. George (Serbian: Црква Светог Ђорђа, romanized: Crkva Svetog Đorđa) is a Serbian Orthodox wooden church in Takovo, Serbia; it is located in the Gornji Milanovac municipality of the Moravica District. The church is included in the list of Monuments of Culture of Exceptional Importance of the Republic of Serbia (SK 502).

== History ==
The church in Takovo, dedicated to Saint George, was built in 1795, shortly after the end of the Koča's Frontier revolt, on the site of another church dating back to 1726.

The church owes its fame to the fact that Miloš Obrenović launched the Second Serbian Uprising against the Ottomans there. This important historical event, known as the Takovo Meeting, took place on 23 April 1815, on Palm Sunday; after receiving communion, the other insurgent leaders, in front of the church, took a solemn oath of loyalty to Miloš and the Serbs, "by the Honorable Cross and Golden Freedom" (Serbian: на крст часни и слободу златну, romanized: na krst časni i slobodu zlatnu).

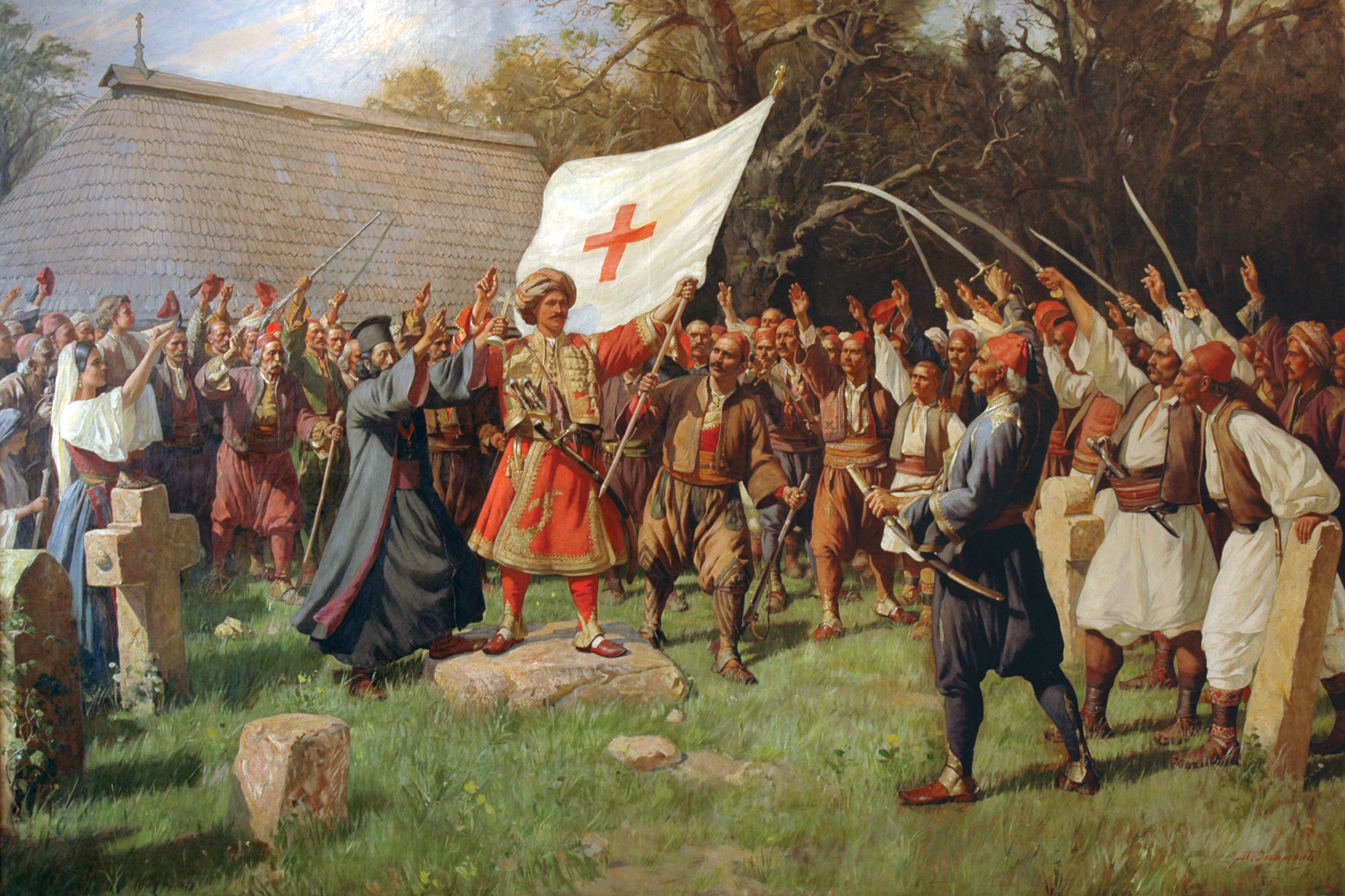
The Takovo Uprising by Paja Jovanović (1889), Takovo Museum. The church can be seen in the background.

== Architecture ==
The very simple Church of St. George consists of a single nave extended by a semicircular apse. It has a stone base on which the oak walls rest; the steeply sloping roof is covered with oak wood shingles. The whole is the work of master craftsmen from the Osat region in eastern Bosnia; these craftsmen are also responsible for a rich decoration, with doors and beams adorned with geometric or floral motifs characteristic of the influence of Islamic art.

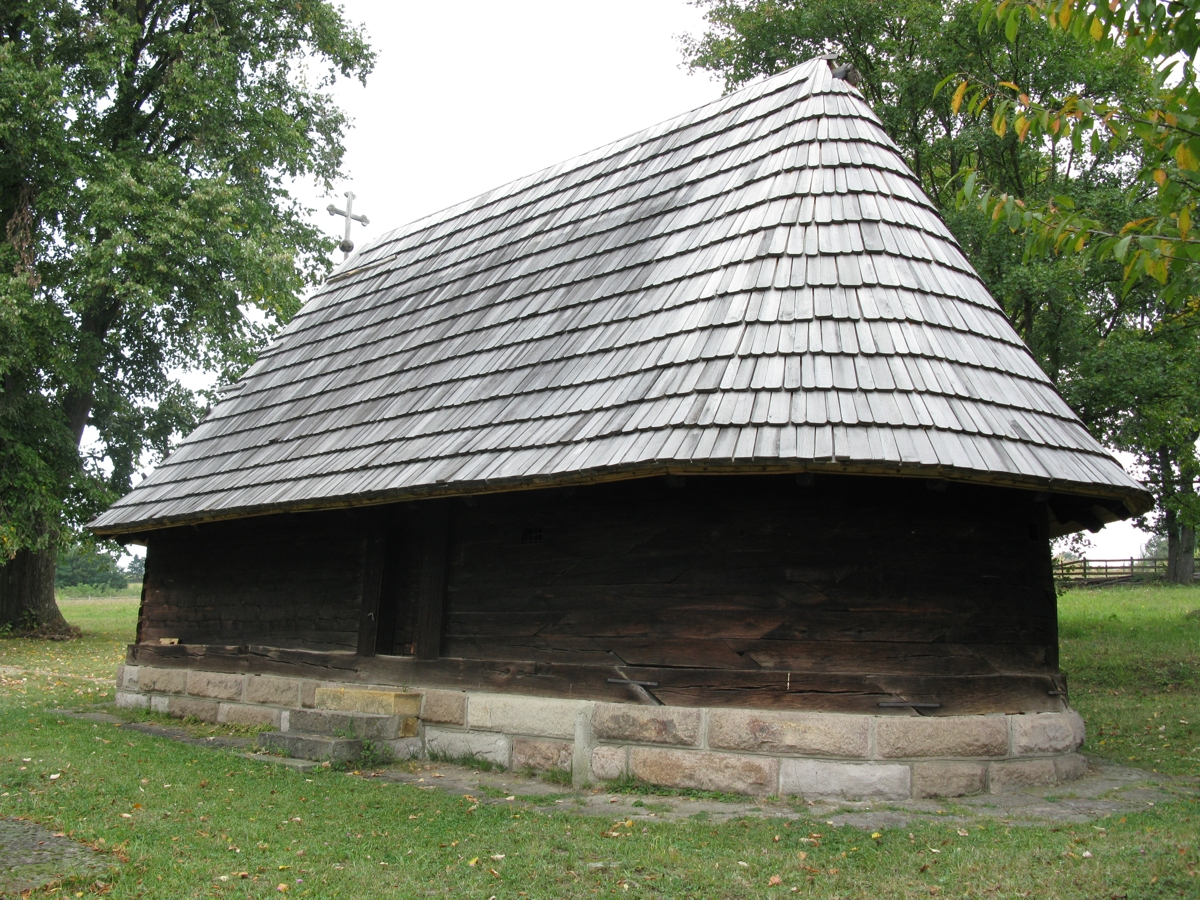
South facade of the church.

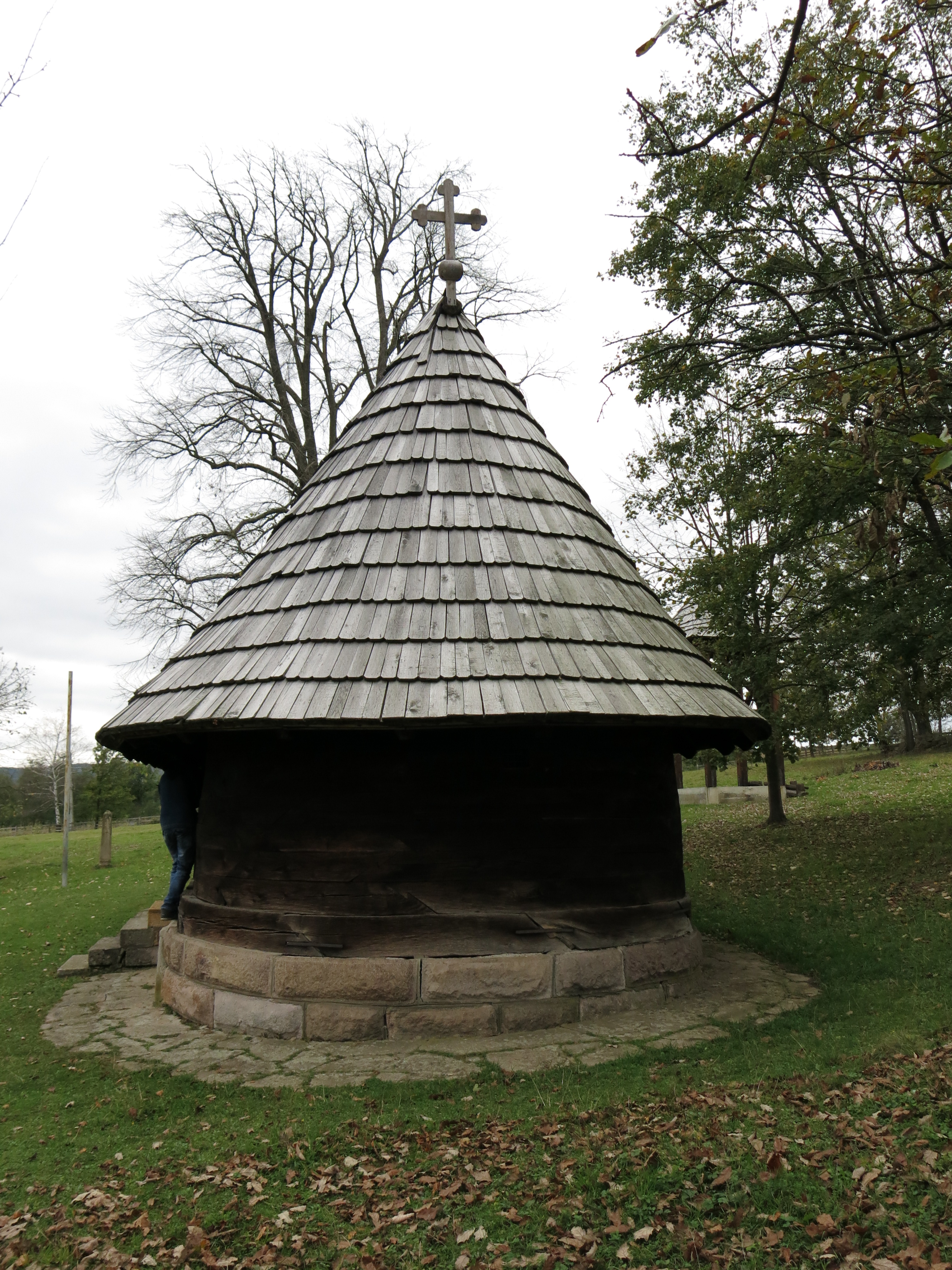
The bedside.

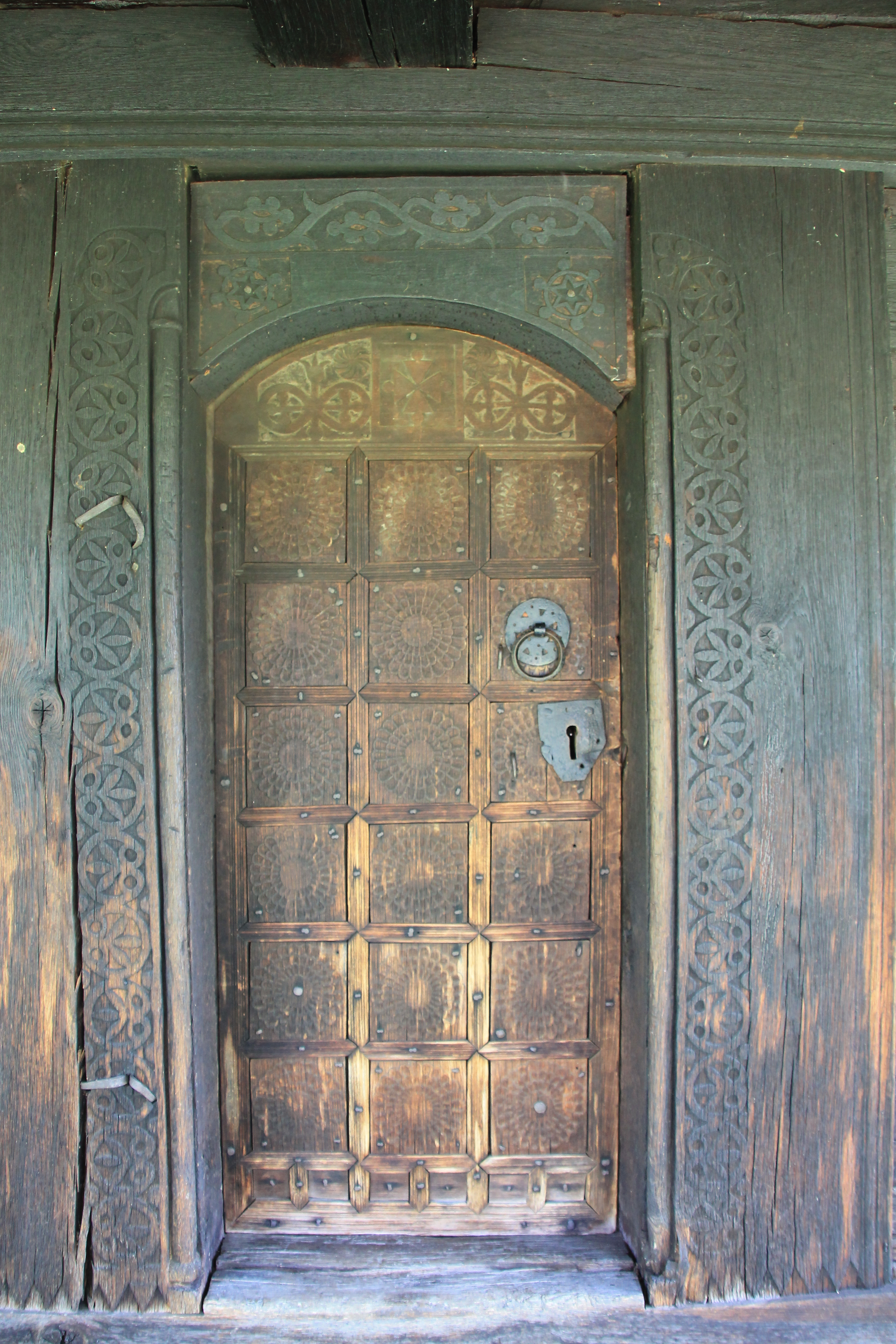
Detail of the west door.

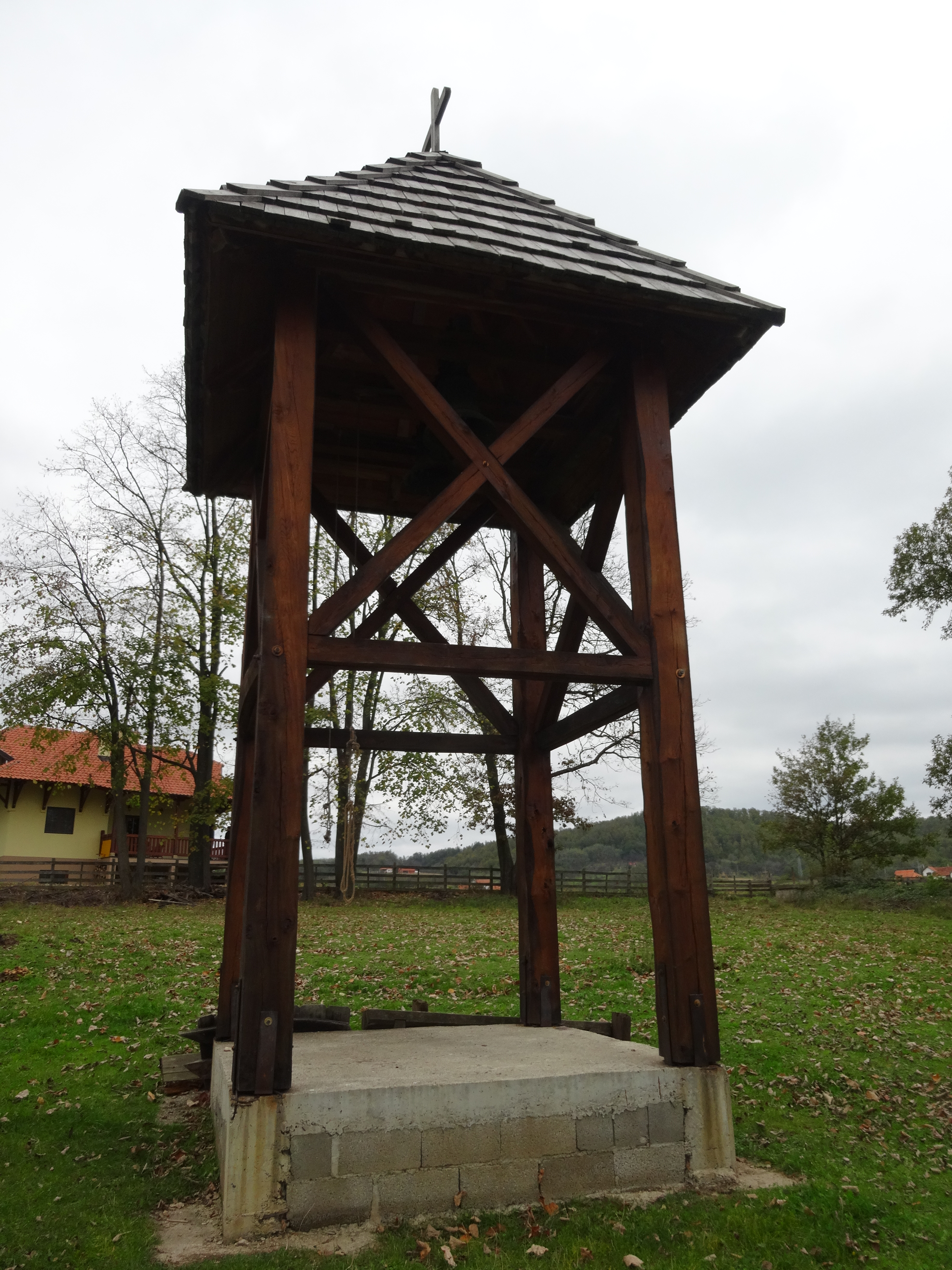
The bell tower.

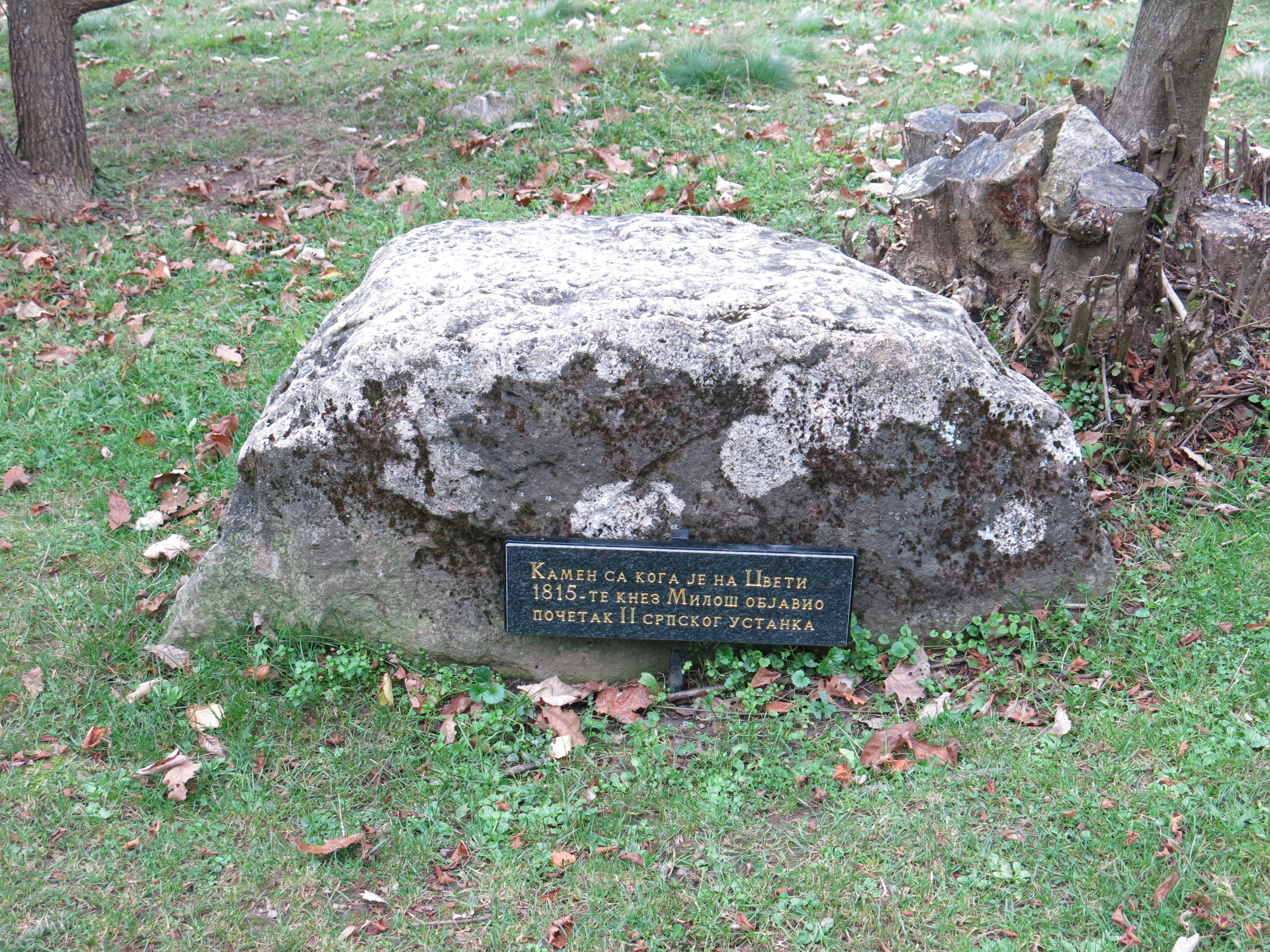
Stone from which the start of the Second Serbian Uprising was announced.

== Paintings ==
The iconostasis of the church was donated by Jovan Obrenović, brother of Miloš. Painted at various times, it lacks any real stylistic unity. The Annunciation and the portraits of the Four Evangelists were painted in 1808 by Jeremija Mihailović, who was part of Hadži-Ruvim's artistic circle; the Crucifixion dates from the 1830s; other icons, in rather poor condition, date from the first half of the 20th century.

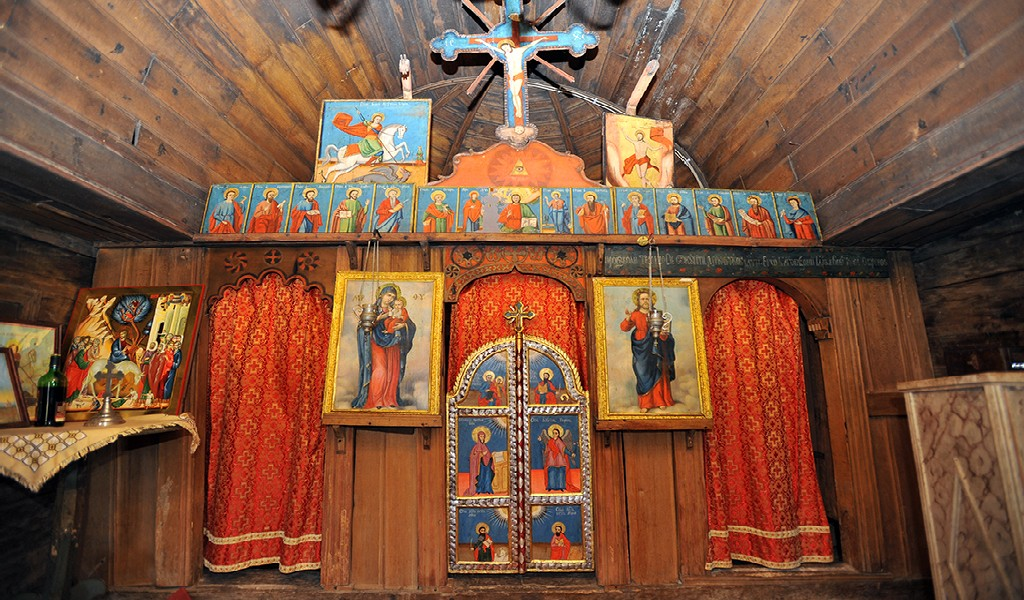
The iconostasis of the church.

== See also ==
- Monument of Culture of Exceptional Importance
- Takovo Museum
- Miloš Obrenović's House
