= Takovo Meeting =

1815 gathering of Serbian leaders

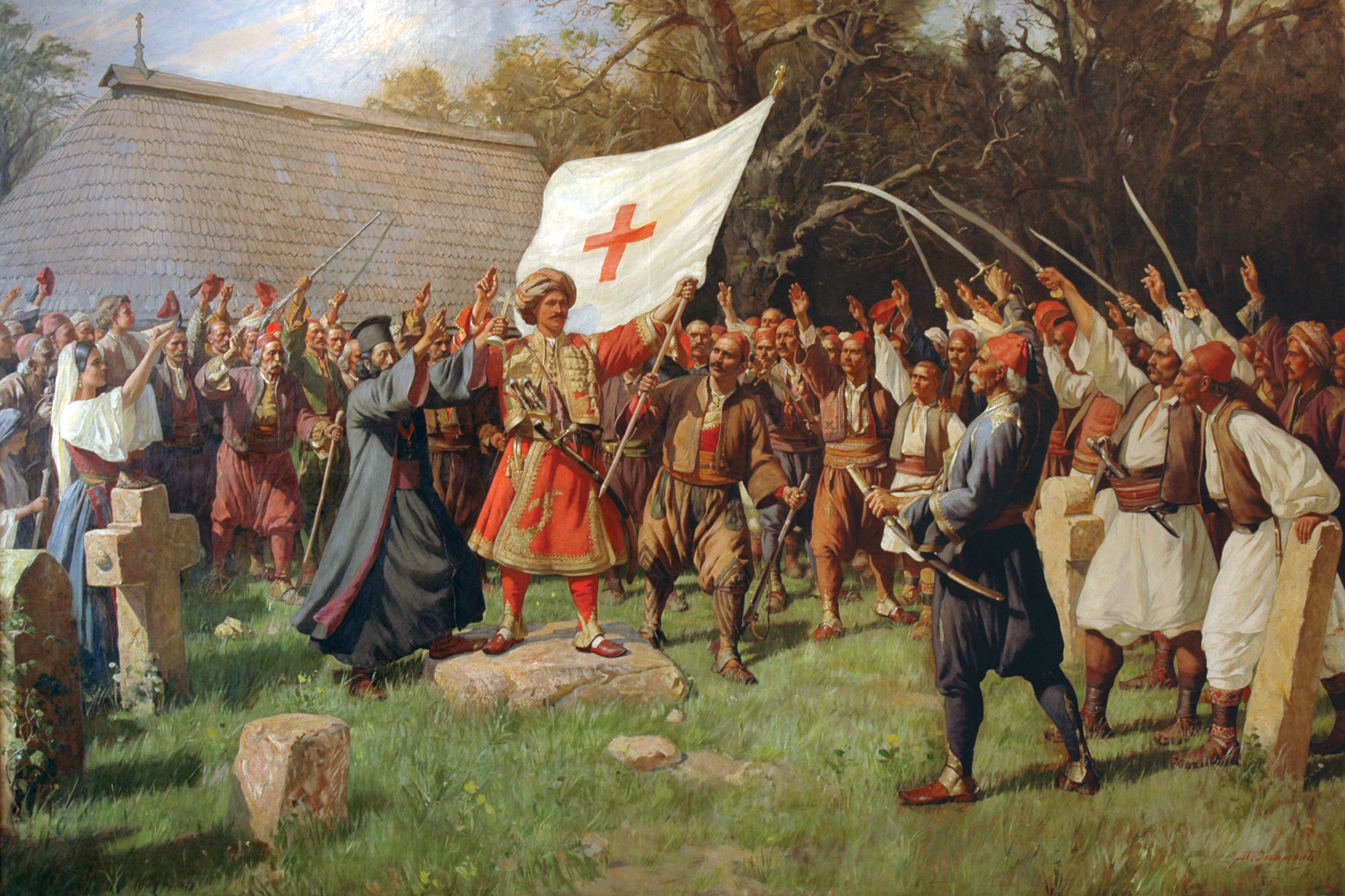
The Takovo Uprising by Paja Jovanović (1889), Takovo Museum. The Church of St. George can be seen in the background.

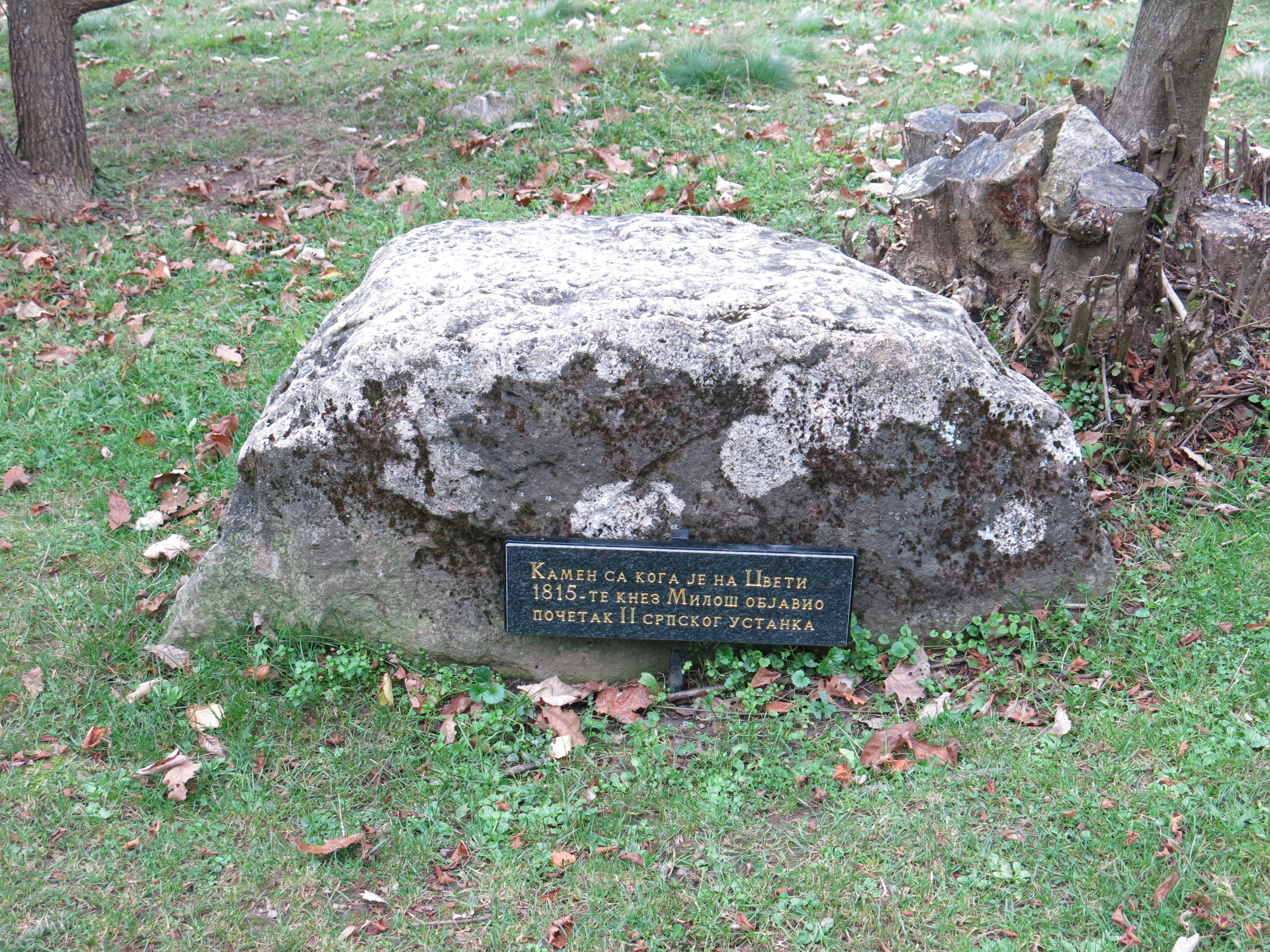
Stone from which the start of the Second Serbian Uprising was announced.

The Takovo Meeting (Serbian: Састанак у Такову, romanized: Sastanak u Takovu) was the gathering of Serbian leaders held on 23 April [O.S. 11 April] 1815 (Palm Sunday) at Takovo, a village near present-day Gornji Milanovac. Two years following the collapse of the First Serbian Uprising, the decision was made to start a new uprising against the Ottoman Empire under the leadership of Miloš Obrenović. The meeting was held on the day of the traditional people's gathering, to which people from many Serbian regions attended. Preparations were kept in strict secrecy, with agitation limited to territories of Rudnik, Kragujevac and Čačak nahias. The idea of a new uprising was met with broad support among the masses.

However, the Serbs, disgruntled by Turkish oppression, did not wait for 11 April. Attacks on Turkish detachments and officials began already on 8 April 1815. The Takovo Meeting was the beginning of the Second Serbian Uprising.

== See also ==
- Serbian Revolution
  - Timeline of the Serbian Revolution
- Order of the Cross of Takovo
- Orašac Assembly

== Sources ==
- Milan. Đ Milićević: Kneževina Srbija, 1876.
- Miroslav Timotijević: Takovski ustanak — Srpske Cveti, Beograd 2012.
