= The Takovo Uprising =

Painting by Paja Jovanović

- Таковски устанак (Serbian)
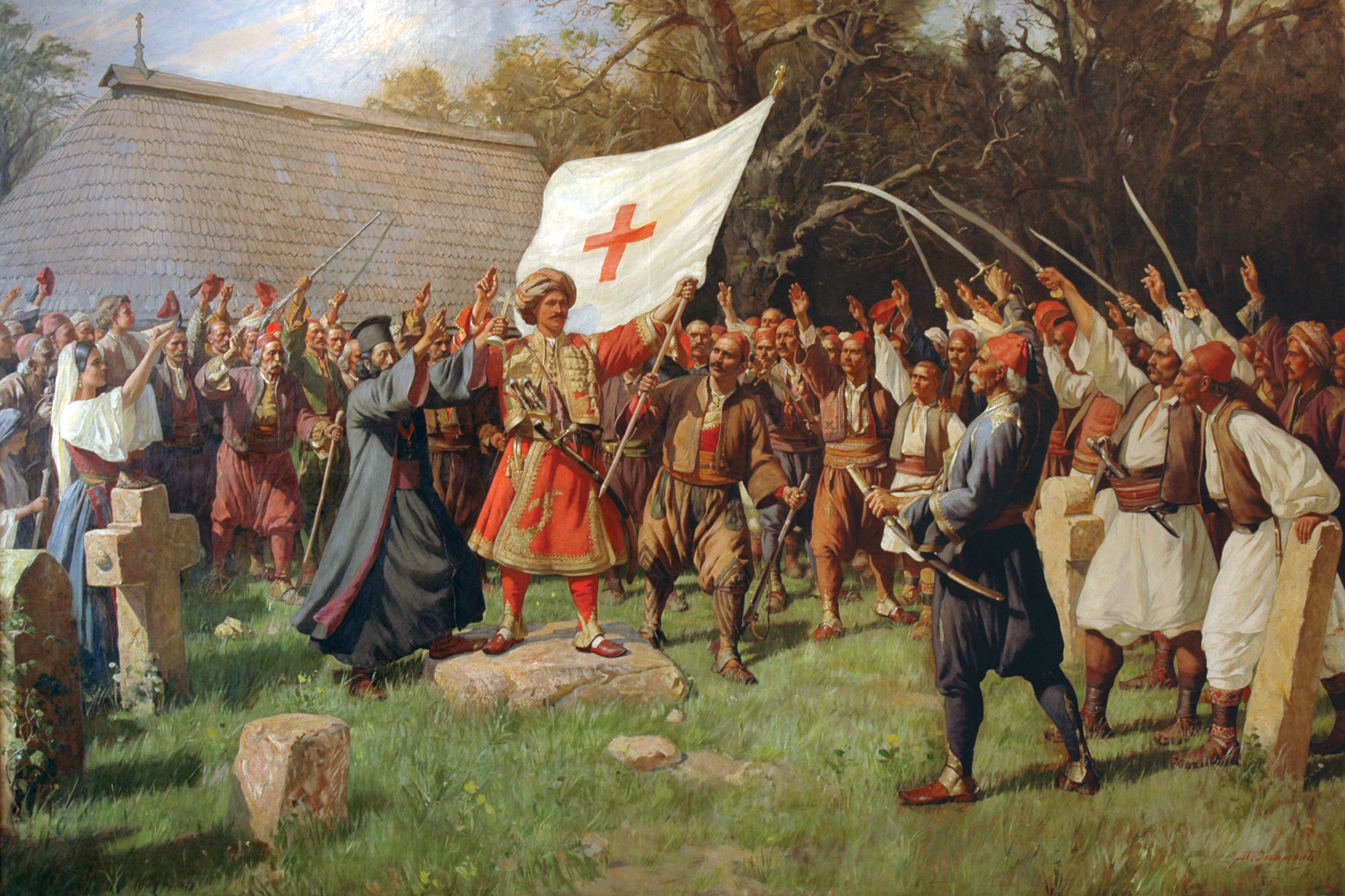
- Artist: Paja Jovanović
- Year: c. 1894
- Medium: Oil on canvas
- Dimensions: 160 cm × 256 cm (63 in × 101 in)
- Location: Takovo Museum; Takovo

The Takovo Uprising is the title of two nearly identical oil paintings by the Serbian realist Paja Jovanović. They depict rebel leader Miloš Obrenović inciting his countrymen against the Ottoman Empire, at the Takovo Meeting, and initiating the Second Serbian Uprising.

The first version, 160 by 256 centimetres (63 by 101 in), was painted in Paris in 1894 and first exhibited in Belgrade the following year. The second, measuring 125.5 by 190 centimetres (49.4 by 74.8 in), was composed specifically for King Alexander, who had also commissioned the first version. As part of his preparations, Jovanović studied authentic costumes and armaments from the time of the uprising, visited Takovo and sketched the church and large tree under which Obrenović incited the people. Jovanović also studied the facial features of locals and sketched them, and so some of their faces appear in the painting.

Lithographic reproductions of the painting were soon made widely available, and distributed by the Serbian Ministry of Education in secondary schools, teachers' schools, and seminaries, contributing to its subsequent popularity. The first version is on permanent display at a museum in Gornji Milanovac, while the second is in the possession of the National Museum of Serbia. The art historian Lilien Filipovitch-Robinson identifies it as one of Jovanović's finest works.

== Description ==
The Takovo Uprising (Serbian: Takovski ustanak) is the title given to two nearly identical oil paintings that were composed by the Serbian realist Paja Jovanović between 1894 and 1898. The first version, the larger of the two paintings, measures 160 by 256 centimetres (63 by 101 in), and is unsigned and undated. The second measures 125.5 by 190 centimetres (49.4 by 74.8 in), and the artist's signature, П. Јовановић, can be seen at the bottom right.

The paintings show Obrenović standing before the Serb leaders and clan elders at Takovo and inciting them to revolt. According to legend, he appeared before the crowd and proclaimed: "Here I am, and here you are. War to the Turks!". Obrenović is depicted standing atop a large stone, wearing a turban and a red, Oriental-style costume covered in golden embroidery, surrounded by a semi-circle of followers. A sword hangs from his waist, and two pistols protrude from his belt. His right arm points up at the sky, with the thumb, middle and index finger extended. With his left hand outstretched, Obrenović waves a large revolutionary flag depicting a red cross centered against a white background. The flag is a variant of that used by the Petrović-Njegoš dynasty, which ruled Montenegro at the time of the uprising, and is reminiscent of the Christian flag flown at the Battle of Kosovo, which according to popular belief, marked the beginning of the Ottoman occupation of the Balkans. The flag provokes an enthusiastic response from the crowd, members of which raise their swords in salute. Others gesture with their muskets. To the far left, a woman places her child on top of a headstone, and both raise their hands in salute. Besides Obrenović is a priest who gives him his blessing. The priest is bearded, and wears a typical, long black robe and Eastern Orthodox religious headdress. Behind the priest is a large group of Obrenović's followers, most with their swords sheathed and hands emulating Obrenović's three-fingered gesture. To Obrenović's right, a man wearing Turkish clothes (red fez, dolman and shalvar pants) places his hand on the flagpole the rebel leader is holding. It is unclear if the man wishes to take the flag away from Obrenović or help bear it. Behind him, a large group of mustachioed men wearing similar clothes raise their arms and salute Obrenović.

The differences between the first and second versions of The Takovo Uprising are minimal. The second version has a warmer tone, includes an additional boulder at the bottom left-hand corner and boasts figures that are slightly more expressive.

== History ==
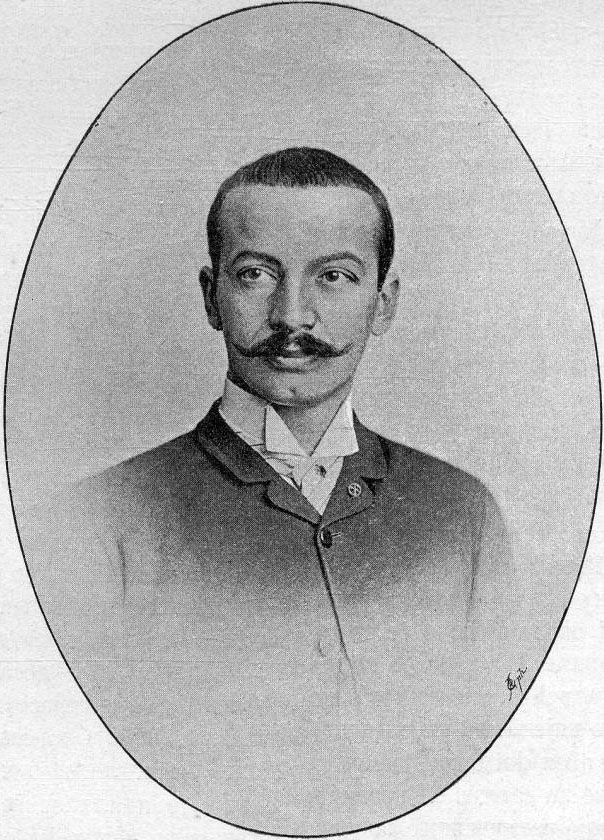
Paja Jovanović, c. 1900

Despite the initial success of the First Serbian Uprising, by 1813 the Ottomans had reoccupied vast areas of Serbia that had once been under rebel control and captured Belgrade. Once Serbia was firmly in their control, the Ottomans carried out numerous revenge killings throughout the countryside. Following these attacks, the Grand Vizier declared an amnesty, and many Serbs who had gone into hiding returned to their homes. Given Serbia's lack of good roads, the Ottomans had to rely on some of the former Serb rebels, such as Stanoje Glavaš and Miloš Obrenović, to maintain order and collect taxes on their behalf. This arrangement remained unchanged until early 1815, when the Ottomans turned on some of the former rebels and killed them. Rumours of an impending Ottoman assault spread quickly throughout Serbia. In April 1815, on Palm Sunday, Serb elders and leaders met in the village of Takovo and elected Obrenović their leader. Shortly afterwards, the Serbs rose in revolt, inflicting a series of humiliating defeats on the Ottomans, in what came to be known as the Second Serbian Uprising. In subsequent peace treaties, the Serbs were granted autonomy, and Obrenović was recognized as the Prince of Serbia.

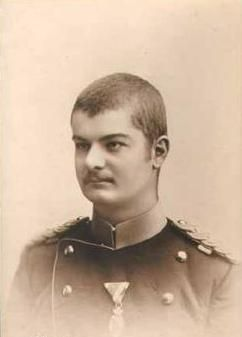
The painting was commissioned by the young King Alexander in 1889

In 1889, Miloš's descendant King Alexander visited Jovanović at his Vienna studio and requested a painting of the revolt to commemorate its 75th anniversary. With his rise in stature, the artist had found himself producing numerous replicas of his earlier Orientalist works. According to biographer Nikola Kusovac, Jovanović grew bored with painting replicas and considered taking up a different genre. Alexander's request presented Jovanović with an opportunity to deviate from Orientalism and try his hand at history painting. The Takovo Uprising was his first historical composition.

Jovanović strove to make The Takovo Uprising as historically accurate as possible. He studied authentic costumes and armaments from the time of the uprising, visited Takovo and sketched the church and large tree under which Obrenović led the people to revolt. Jovanović also studied the facial features of locals and sketched them, and so some of their faces appear in the painting. Jovanović painted The Takovo Uprising in Paris over the course of several months in 1894. It was first exhibited the following year at his brother Milan's photography studio in Belgrade, not far from King Alexander's residence, the Old Palace. The exhibition coincided with the uprising's 80th anniversary.

In 1895, the first version of The Takovo Uprising was purchased by the Zagreb merchant Petar Nikolić, who made lithographic reproductions of the painting and placed them into mass circulation. Nikolić donated this version to the National Museum of Serbia in 1898. In subsequent years, it came into the possession of the Rudnik–Takovo Regional Museum in Gornji Milanovac, where it is on permanent display. The second version of The Takovo Uprising was painted in 1898 for the "private collection of His Majesty, the King", and was also lithographically reproduced. Following Alexander's assassination in May 1903, the painting was acquired by the National Museum, in whose possession it remains.

== Analysis ==
The paintings were composed within several years of Alexander coming to power. His father and predecessor, King Milan, was so unpopular that he had to abdicate his throne. Alexander's reign was marked by protracted political instability, culminating in the coup d'état that resulted in his death. The art historian Lilien Filipovitch-Robinson believes The Takovo Uprising was composed in response to the chaotic political climate. She writes:

Jovanović was promoting a much needed type of imagery. Miloš is shown as a true leader of his people. Devoted to his country, he epitomizes bravery and strength of character reinforced by faith. The painting, then, was more than a careful reiteration of known facts or a historical narrative. Intended as didactic and inspirational, it was to be read in light of the present.

The painting, she asserts, was to serve as "a reminder of Serb achievements during and after the Second Uprising, and of the leadership that made those successes possible." Jovanović's positioning Obrenović slightly left of centre ensures that he fully dominates the scene. "The brown soil and gravestones of the churchyard," Filipovitch-Robinson writes, "stand as reminders of the transitory nature of physical life". The political scientist Anamaria Segesten suggests that the portrayal of Obrenović wearing Turkish clothing, particularly a turban, might be a reference to his collaboration with the Ottomans prior to the uprising, and his adoption of Ottoman customs while staying in Istanbul. She notes that half the people gathered around Obrenović are also wearing Turkish clothes, signifying that while they might temporarily have professed loyalty to the Ottoman sultan, they are actually patriots willing to rise up and fight for the Serbian cause when the moment is right. "While clearly caught up in the emotion of the moment," Filipovitch-Robinson writes, "they are solid and dignified, ordinary people united by shared beliefs and a common cause."

== Reception and legacy ==
The Takovo Uprising made a great impression on Jovanović's contemporaries, and lithographic prints were distributed by the Serbian Ministry of Education in secondary schools, teachers' schools, and seminaries. Tim Judah, a journalist specializing in the Balkans, ranks the painting as one of Jovanović's most famous uprising-themed works. Filipovitch-Robinson praises Jovanović for providing "further historical testimony to the steadfast faith that enabled the Serbs to retain their identity and unity as a people and persist in their goal of regaining their freedom and nationhood." She ranks the painting among Jovanović's best, alongside Migration of the Serbs (1896) and The Proclamation of Dušan's Law Codex (1900). The writer and politician Vuk Drašković, who is widely credited with devising the Serbian three-finger salute, has stated that the painting was his primary source of inspiration for the gesture.

== Bibliography ==
- Antić, Radmila (1970). Paja Jovanović. Belgrade, Yugoslavia: Belgrade City Museum. OCLC 18028481.
- Filipovitch-Robinson, Lilien (2008). "Paja Jovanović and the Imagining of War and Peace" (PDF). Journal of the North American Society for Serbian Studies. 22 (1). Bloomington, Indiana: Slavica Publishers: 35–53. ISSN 0742-3330. Archived from the original (PDF) on 8 December 2015.
- Filipovitch-Robinson, Lilien (2014). "From Tradition to Modernism: Uroš Predić and Paja Jovanović". In Bogdanović, Jelena; Filipovitch-Robinson, Lilien; Marjanović, Igor (eds.). On the Very Edge: Modernism and Modernity in the Arts and Architecture of Interwar Serbia (1918–1941). Leuven, Belgium: Leuven University Press. ISBN 978-90-5867-993-2.
- Judah, Tim (2000). The Serbs: History, Myth and the Destruction of Yugoslavia (2nd ed.). New Haven, Connecticut: Yale University Press. ISBN 978-0-300-08507-5.
- Kusovac, Nikola (2009). Паја Јовановић [Paja Jovanović] (in Serbian). Belgrade, Serbia: National Museum of Serbia. ISBN 978-86-80619-55-2.
- Milojković-Djurić, Jelena (1988). Tradition and Avant-Garde: Literature and Art in Serbian Culture, 1900–1918. Vol. 1. Boulder, Colorado: Eastern European Monographs. ISBN 978-0-88033-131-9.
- Petrović, Petar (2012). Паја Јовановић: Систематски каталог дела [Paja Jovanović: A Systematic Catalogue of His Works] (in Serbian). Belgrade, Serbia: National Museum of Serbia. ISBN 978-86-7269-130-6.
- Segesten, Anamaria Dutceac (2011). Myth, Identity and Conflict: A Comparative Analysis of Romanian and Serbian Textbooks. Lanham, Maryland: Lexington Books. ISBN 978-0-7391-4867-9.
- Singleton, Frederick Bernard (1985). A Short History of the Yugoslav Peoples. Cambridge, England: Cambridge University Press. ISBN 978-0-521-27485-2.
- Šuber, Daniel; Karamanić, Slobodan (2012). "Shifting Extremisms: On the Political Iconology in Contemporary Serbia". In Alexander, Jeffrey C.; Bartmański, Dominik; Giesen, Bernhard (eds.). Iconic Power: Materiality and Meaning in Social Life. New York City: Palgrave Macmillan. ISBN 978-1-13701-286-9.
