= Takovo =

Takovo Таково
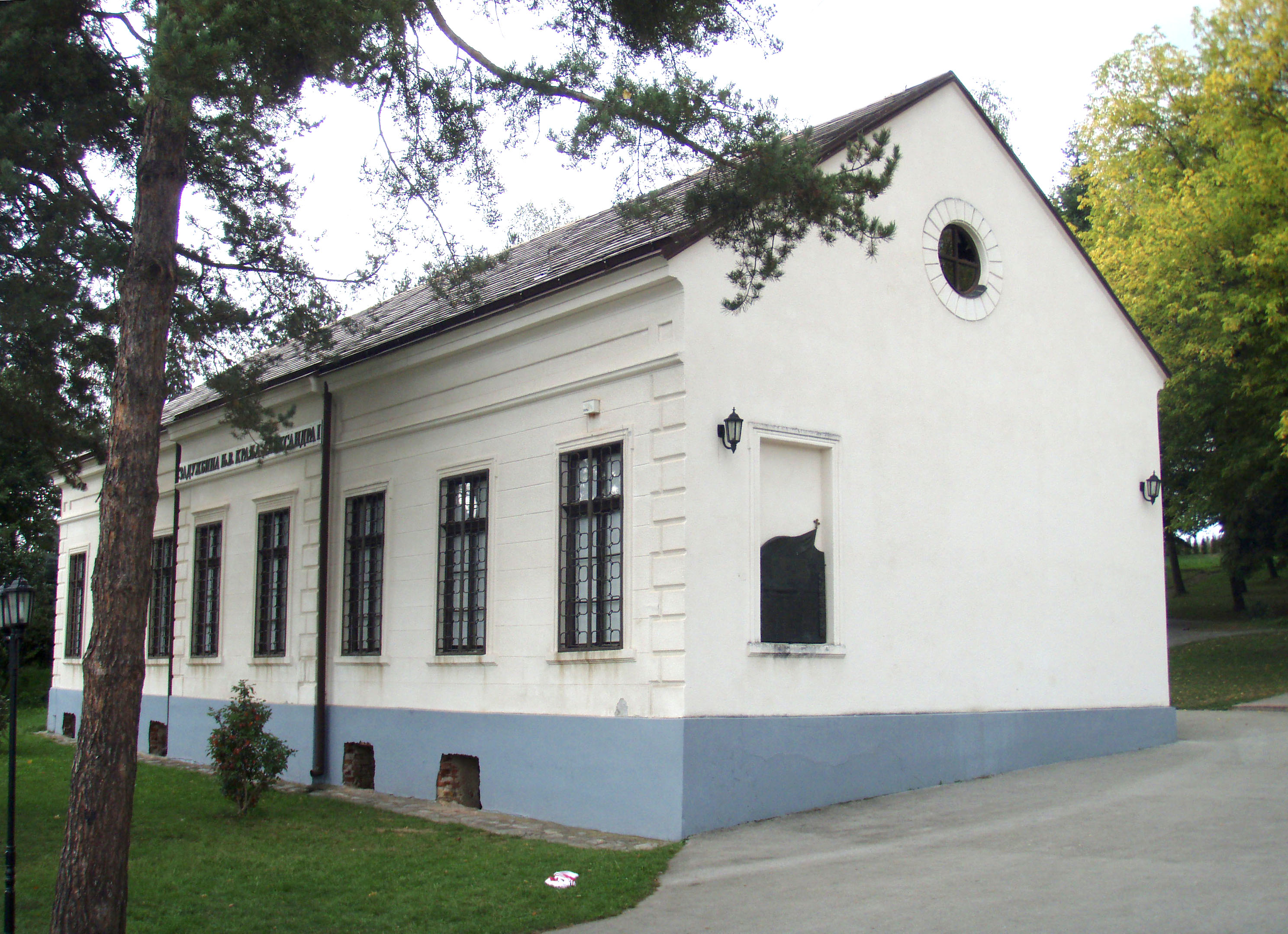
- Museum of Second Serbian Uprising in a historic school

- Location within Serbia
- Coordinates: 44°02′34″N 20°23′15″E
- Country: Serbia
- District: Moravica District
- Municipality: Gornji Milanovac

Area
  - Total: 11.53 km^{2} (4.45 sq mi)
- Elevation: 472 m (1,549 ft)

Population (2011)
  - Total: 458
  - Density: 39.7/km^{2} (103/sq mi)
- Time zone: UTC+1 (CET)
  - Summer (DST): UTC+2 (CEST)

Takovo (Serbian Cyrillic: Таково) is a village in the municipality of Gornji Milanovac, Serbia. According to the 2011 census, the village has a population of 458 people.

== History ==
The village was active in the Serbian Revolution, being organized into the knežina (administrative unit) of Brusnica (Takovo) during the First Serbian Uprising (1804–13). Among notable local revolutionaries were priest Janko Vitomirović; Radojica Paunović; Stevan Kosanović; priest Pavle Nenadović-Ševa; duelist Pantelija Smiljanić; Radomir Paunović.

The Second Serbian Uprising (1815) under the leadership of vojvoda Miloš Obrenović started in this village.

== Gallery ==
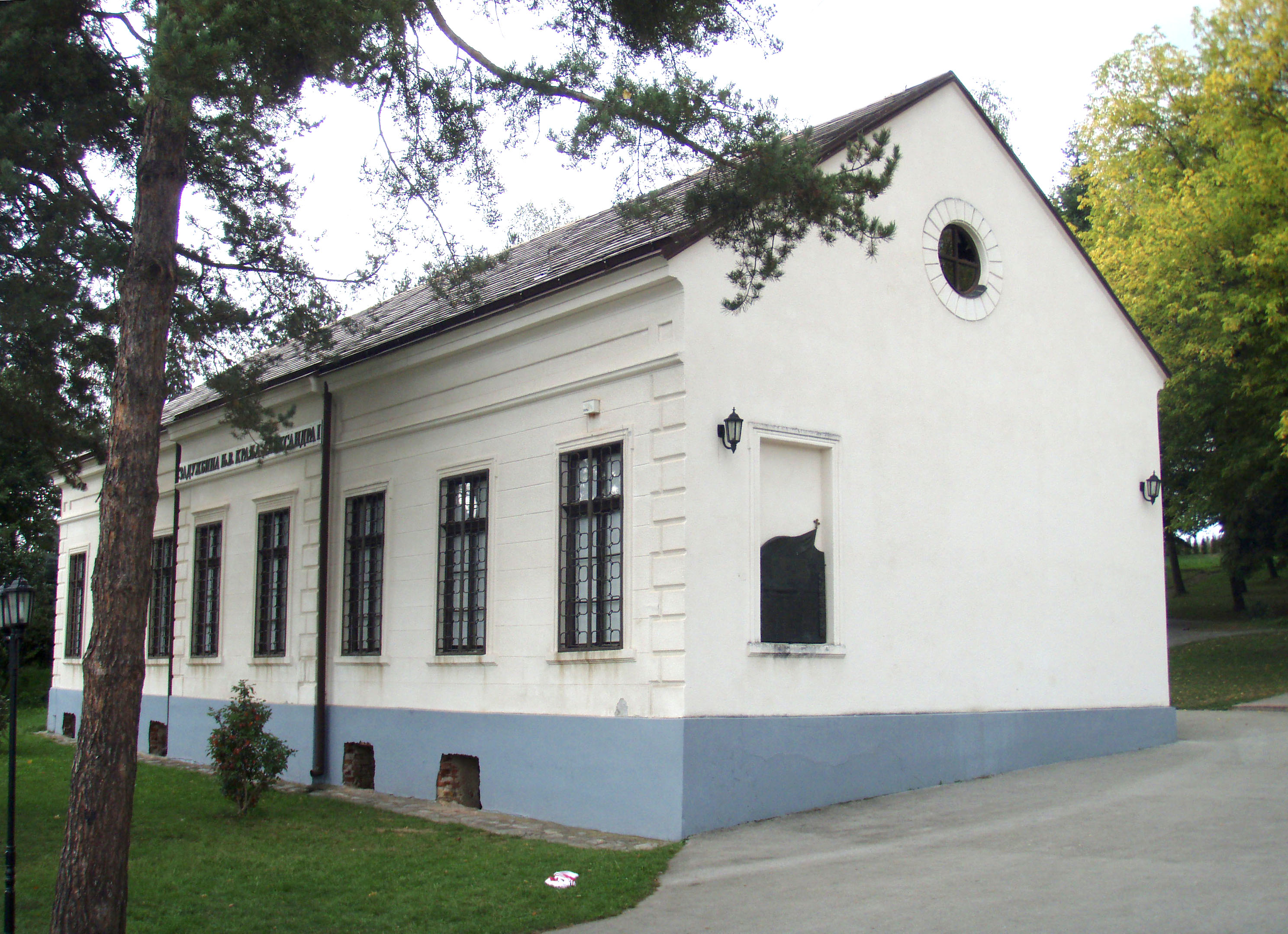
Museum of Second Serbian Uprising

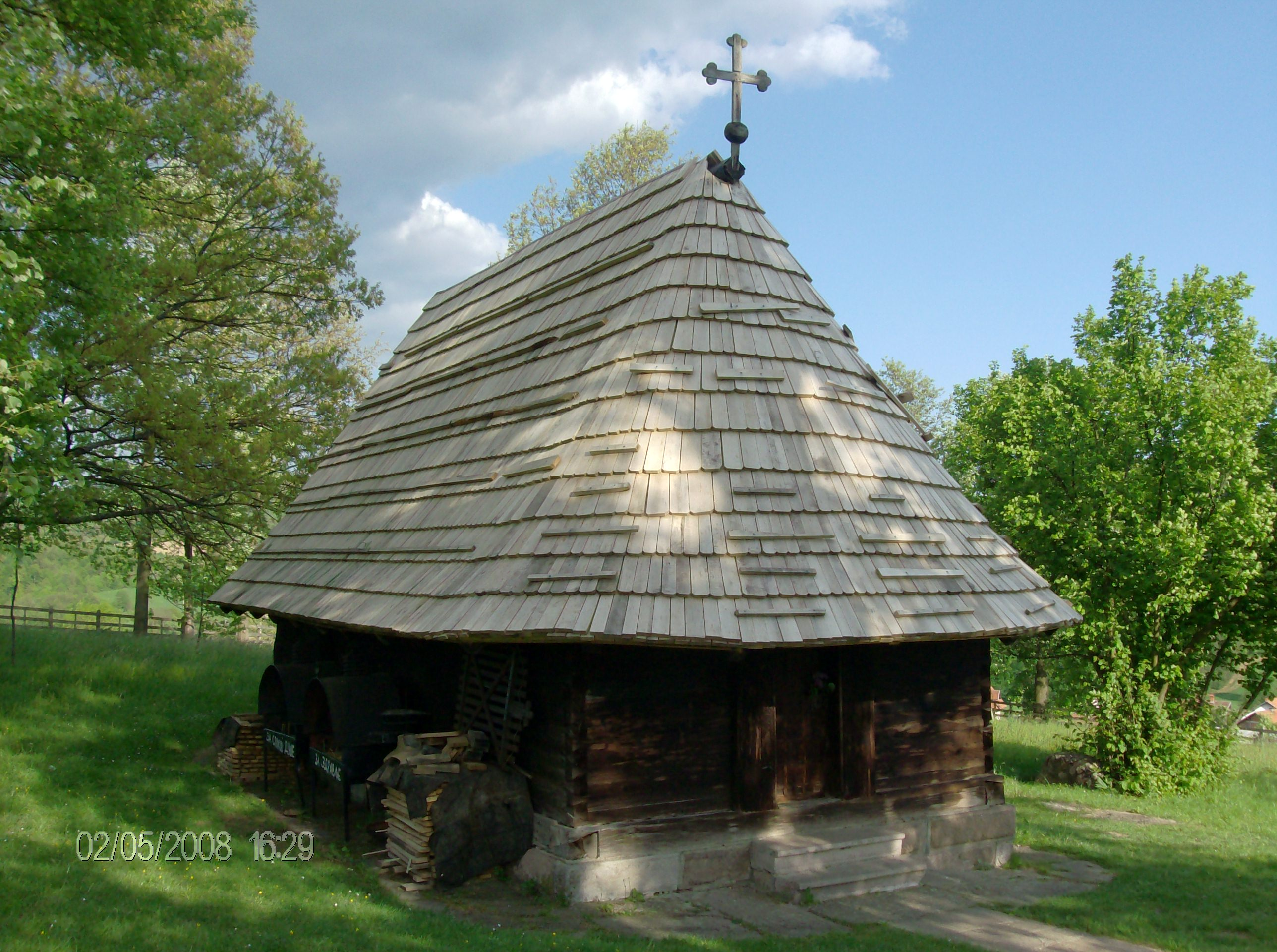
Wooden Church of St. George in Takovo

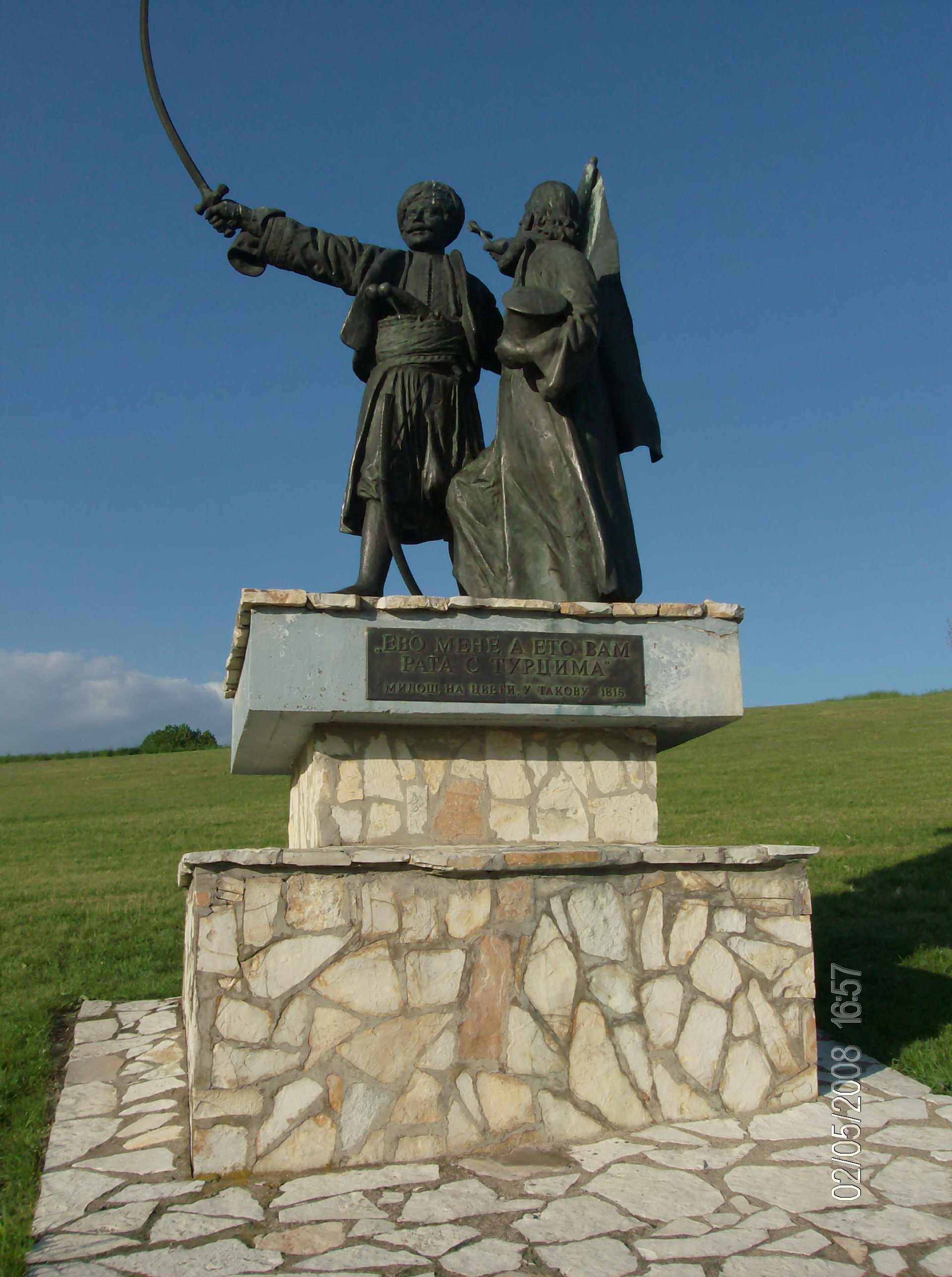
Monument to the Takovo Uprising

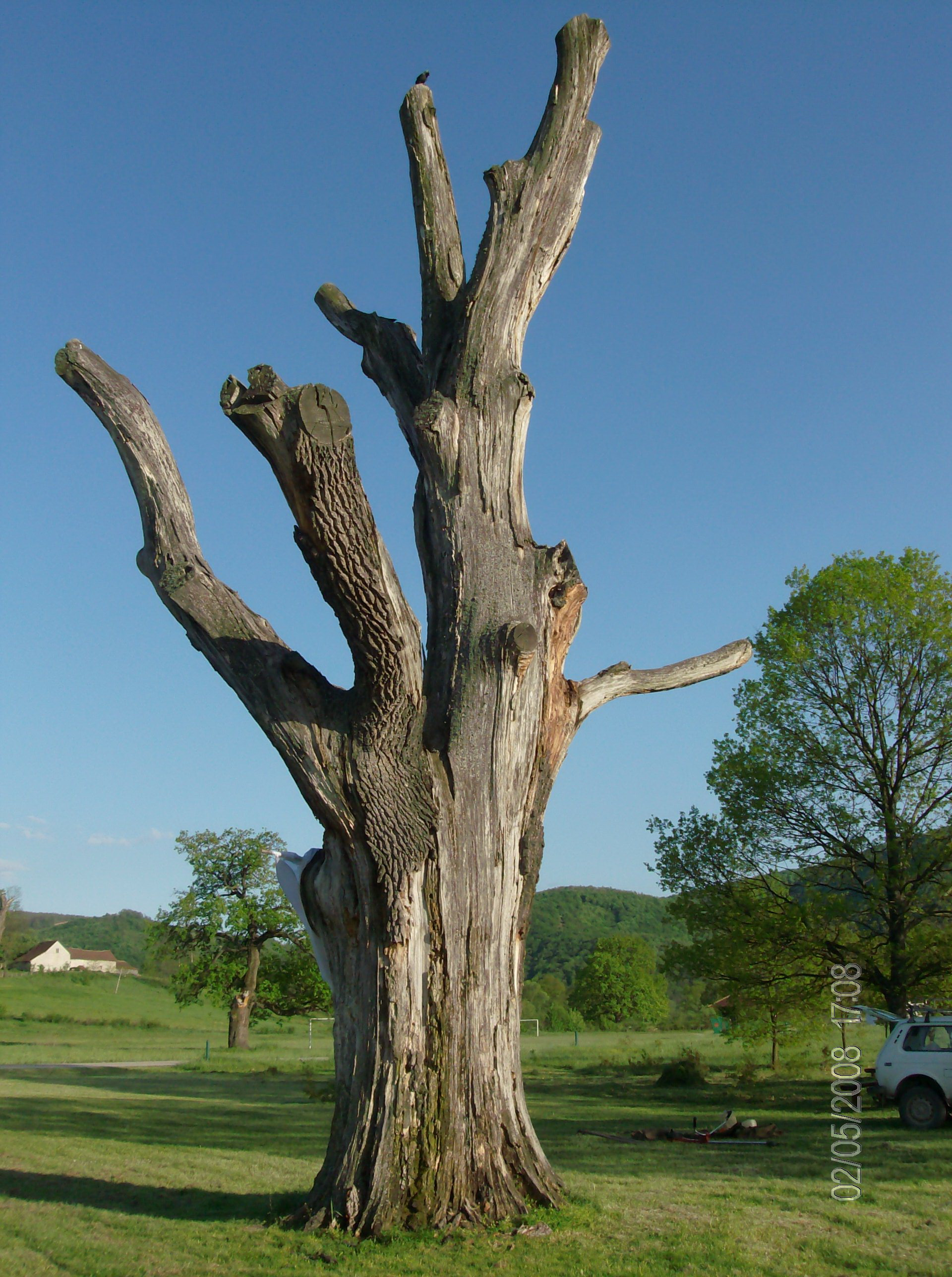

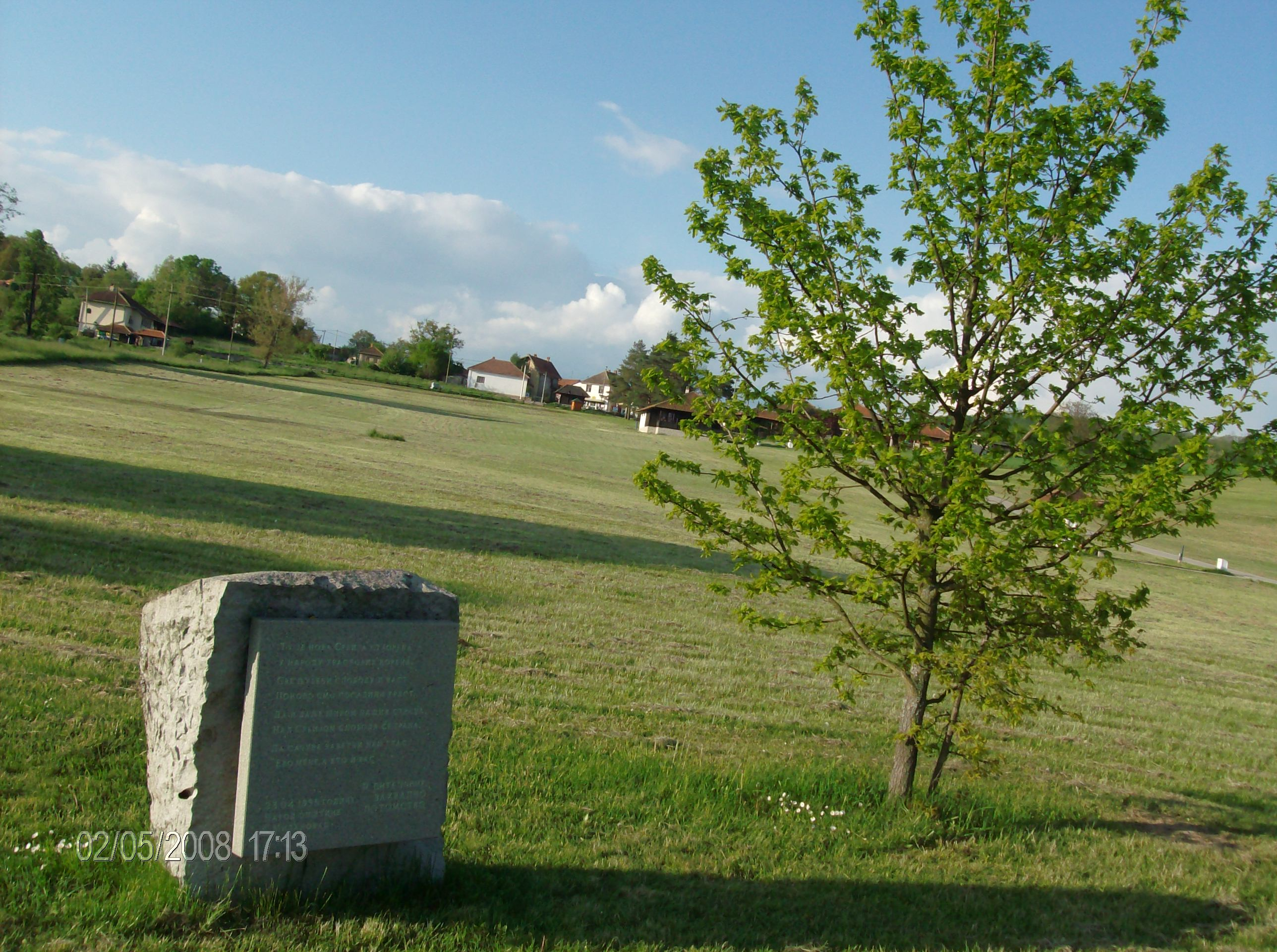

== See also ==
- Monument of Culture of Great Importance
- FK Takovo, a football club from nearby town of Gornji Milanovac, named after the historic village of Takovo.
