= Takovo Museum =

- Muzej u Takovu (Serbian)
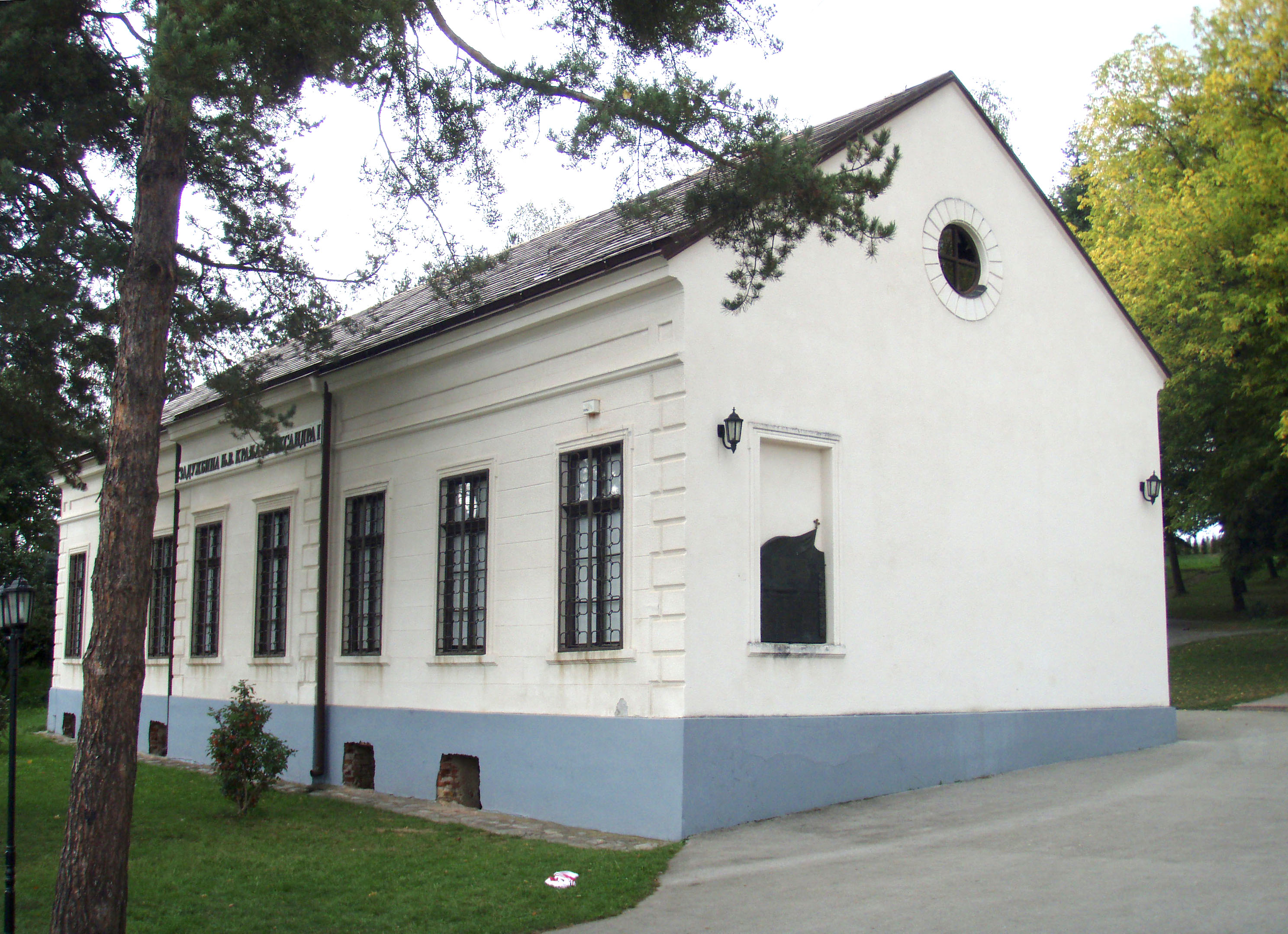
- Takovo Museum
- Interactive map of Takovo Museum
- Location: Takovo Museum, Takovo, Serbia

Takovo Museum is an old museum located in Takovo in the municipality of Gornji Milanovac. Takovo's Museum is located in the school, founded by King Aleksandar Obrenović and tourists, the museum exhibition, inevitably visit the former school, the construction of which was started by King Milan, and completed by his son Alexander.

The museum houses numerous museum exhibits dedicated to the Second Serbian Uprising.

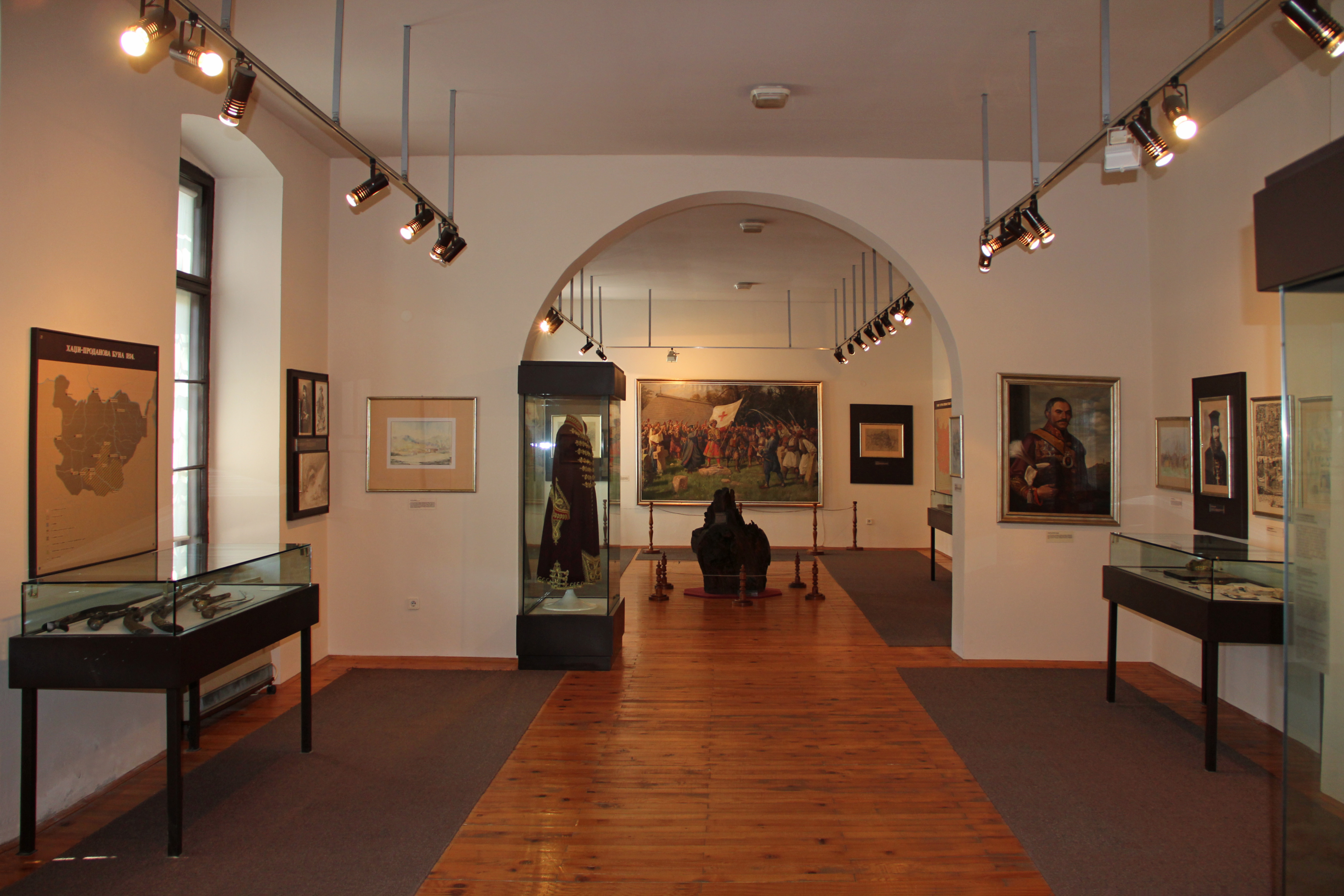
Interior of the museum

== See also ==
- List of museums in Serbia
