= Serbian cheeses =

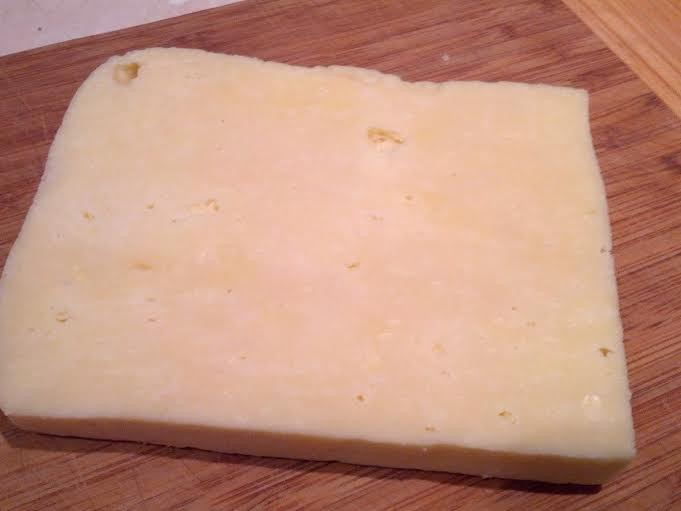
Pirot kačkavalj

There are several regional types of Serbian cheeses, such as the Sjenica, Zlatar, Svrljig and Homolje cheeses. The Pule cheese has gained much notoriety since 2000s as it became the most expensive cheese in the world.

== Types ==
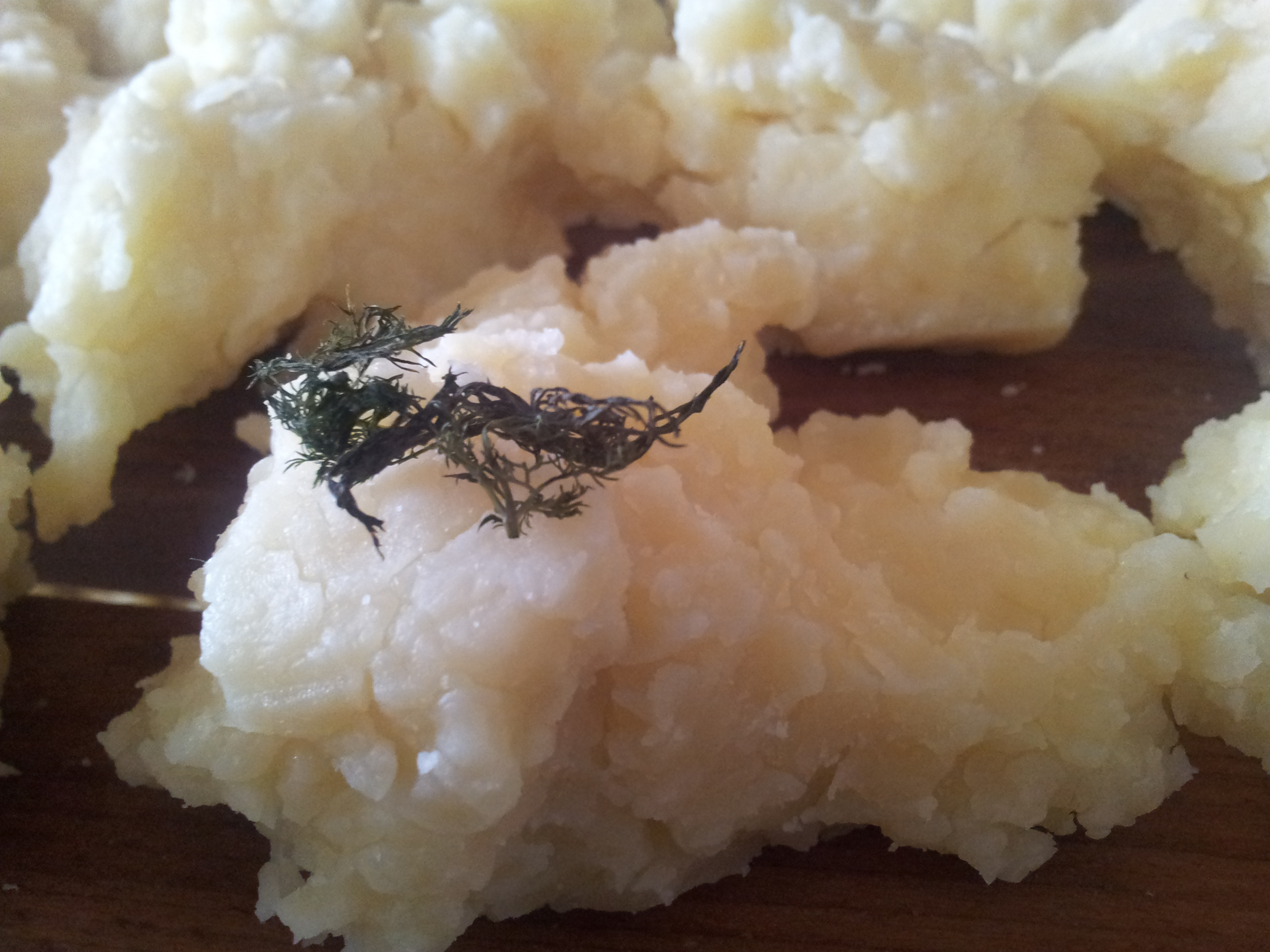
Šar cheese topped with dill

- Cer cheese (cerski sir), made from goat milk, produced in the Cer mountain region
- Homolje cheese (homoljski sir), white brined cheese, from cow, goat or sheep milk, produced in the Homolje valley and mountains (GI)
- Krivi Vir caciocavallo (krivovirski kačkavalj), yellow hard cheese, from sheep, cow and goat milk, produced in the Zaječar region, named after Krivi Vir (GI)
- Mokrin cheese (mokrinski sir), white brined cheese, named after Mokrin
- Pirot caciocavallo (pirotski kačkavalj), hard cheese, produced in the Pirot region
- Pule cheese (pule), smoked cheese, made from donkey milk, produced in Zasavica, world's most expensive cheese
- Šar cheese (šarski sir), hard cheese, produced in Gora, Opolje and Štrpce (in Kosovo), named after Šar Mountains
- Sjenica cheese (sjenički sir), white brined cheese, from sheep milk (traditionally), produced in the Pešter plateau, named after Sjenica, nominated for Intangible Cultural Heritage
- Svrljig cheese (svrljiški sir), white brined cheese, cow milk, produced in the Nišava valley, named after Svrljig
- Svrljig caciocavallo (svrljiški kačkavalj), yellow hard cheese (see kashkaval), from cow milk (GI)
- Zlatar cheese (zlatarski sir), white brined cheese, cow milk, produced in the Pešter plateau, named after Zlatar

== Balkan Cheese Festival ==
There is an annual "Balkan Cheese Festival" in Serbia, held since 2014.

== See also ==
- Vurda, dairy specialty in southeastern Serbia
- Kajmak, dairy specialty in the Balkans and Middle East
- List of cheeses

== Sources ==
- Catherine Donnelly (2016). The Oxford Companion to Cheese. Oxford University Press. pp. 646–. ISBN 978-0-19-933088-1.
