= Balkan donkey =

Breed of donkey

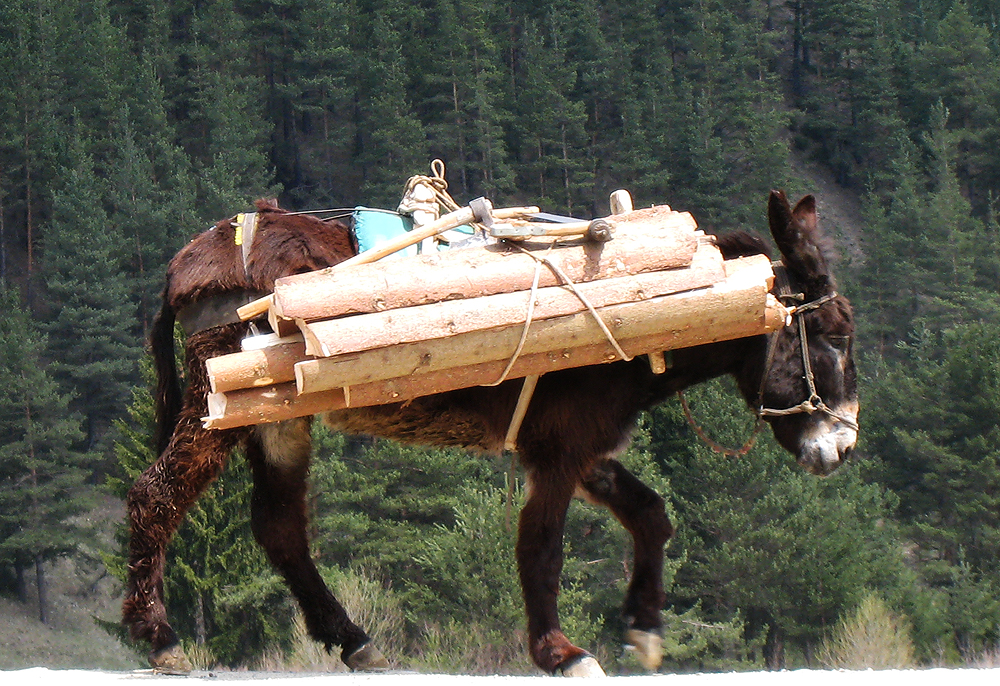
- Balkan donkey
- Other names: Domaći balkanski magarac; Mountain donkey; Domestic Balkan donkey
- Country of origin: Balkans
- Use: transport; burden; meat; milk

The Balkan donkey or mountain donkey, Serbian: Domaći balkanski magarac, is a breed or group of breeds of domestic donkey originating in the Balkan region. It is reported from Serbia and Montenegro.

A herd of about 120 Balkan donkeys in the Zasavica Reserve, Sremska Mitrovica, Serbia, are used to make the world's most expensive cheese, pule cheese.

| Country | Name(s) | English name(s) if used | Notes | Image |
|---|---|---|---|---|
| Albania | Comune; Gomari | | | |
| Bosnia and Herzegovina | | Herzegovinian | | |
| Bulgaria | | Bulgarian | not reported to DAD-IS | |
| Croatia | Istarski Magarac | Istrian Donkey | | |
| Croatia | Primorsko Dinarski Magarac | Littoral Dinaric Donkey | | |
| Croatia | Sjeverno-Jadranski Magarac | North Adriatic Donkey | | |
| Greece | Ellinikon | Greek Ass | | |
| Kosovo | | | | |
| Montenegro | | | | |
| North Macedonia | | | | |
| Romania | | Romanian Ass | | |
| Serbia | Domaci Balkanski Magarac | Domestic Balkan Ass | | |
| Serbia | | Italian | | |
| Slovenia | wsu | Istrian | | |
