= Pule cheese =

Serbian donkey and goat's milk cheese

Pule
- Country of origin: Serbia
- Town: Sremska Mitrovica, at the Zasavica Special Nature Reserve
- Source of milk: Donkeys and goats

Pule or magareći sir, is a Serbian cheese made from 60% Balkan donkey milk and 40% goat's milk. The cheese is produced in Zasavica Nature Reserve.

Pule is reportedly the "world's most expensive cheese", fetching US$1300 per kilogram. It is so expensive because of its difficulty to produce, and its rarity: there are only about 100 jennies in the landrace of Balkan donkeys that are milked for Pule-making and it takes 25 litres (6 1/2 US gal) of milk to create one kilogram (2 lb 3 oz) of cheese.

The taste of Pule cheese is reputed to be similar to that of manchego, a combination of nutty and earthy flavours, accompanied by a crumbly texture.

In 2012, tabloids including The Daily Telegraph and the Daily Mail reported that Novak Djokovic had purchased the entire world's supply of pule cheese for his restaurants, but a manager at Zasavica denied these claims, stating that Djokovic's restaurant had simply been given a sample of pule cheese.

== See also ==
- List of cheeses
- List of smoked foods
