= Zasavica (bog) =

Bog in Mačva, Serbia

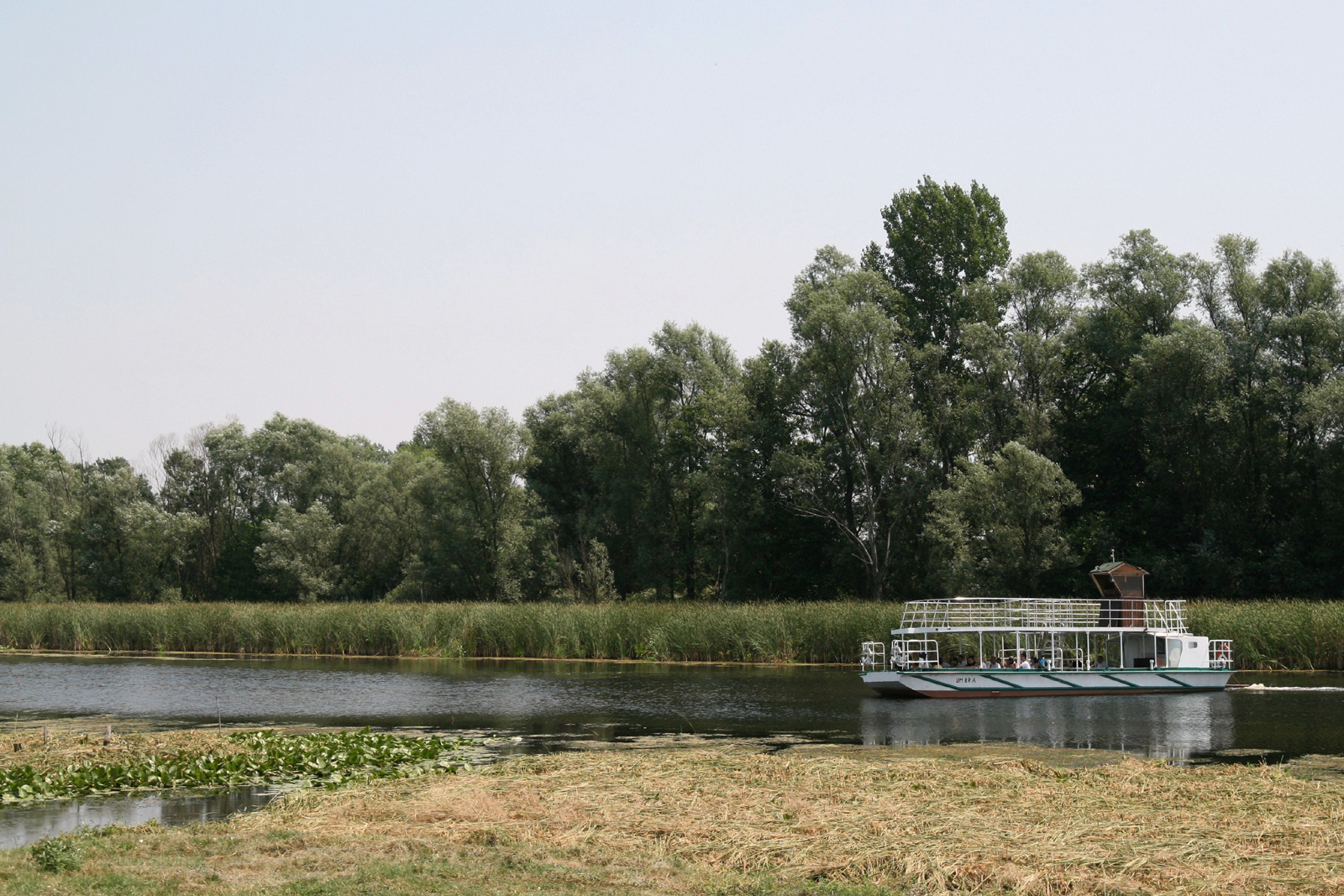

- Location within Vojvodina
- Location: Mačva region, Vojvodina province (partially)
- Coordinates: 44.957624°N 19.526369°E
- Type: marsh
- Primary inflows: Zasavica River
- Primary outflows: Zasavica River
- Basin countries: Serbia
- Max. length: 33 kilometres (21 mi)
- Max. width: 300 metres (330 yd)
- Surface area: 11.5 square kilometres (4.4 sq mi)
- Average depth: 2.5 metres (8.2 ft)
- Max. depth: 10 metres (33 ft)
- Surface elevation: 76–82 m (249–269 ft)
- Settlements: Zasavica I Zasavica II; Noćaj; Ravnje

Ramsar Wetland
- Official name: Zasavica
- Designated: 13 March 2008
- Reference no.: 1783

The Zasavica (Serbian Cyrillic: Засавица) is a bog in the region of Mačva, west central Serbia. It is a major wildlife refuge and one of the last authentically preserved wetlands in Serbia. In the 2000s it became a popular attraction with the successful reintroduction of beavers, which had become extinct on the same land areas 100 years before.

== Location ==
Zasavica is located several kilometers across the Sava River from the town of Sremska Mitrovica. The entire Zasavica system is located in the Mačva region and is administratively divided between the province of Vojvodina (northern part; municipality of Sremska Mitrovica) and Central Serbia (southern part; municipality of Bogatić). It roughly extends between the settlements of Crna Bara, Banovo Polje, Ravnje, Zasavica I, Zasavica II, Salaš Noćajski, Noćaj and Mačvanska Mitrovica.

== Geography ==
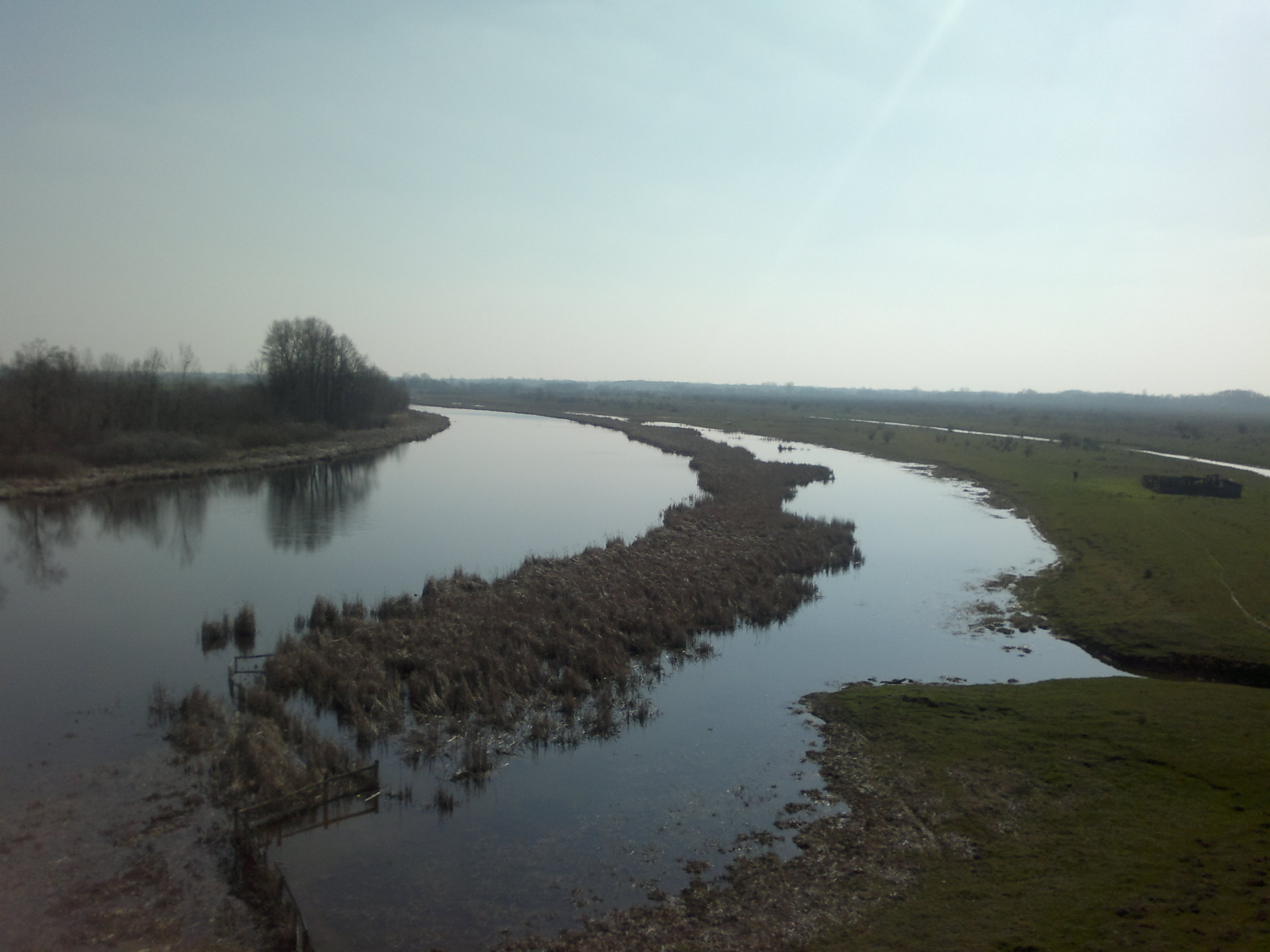
Canal-tributaries to Zasavica

The Zasavica bog is a marshy lowland in the floodplain of the Sava River. It is a typical elongated oxbow (in Serbian: mrtvaja, dead [water]). The fossilized, parallel bed of the Sava is so elongated that it actually stretches almost to the Drina river. In time, Zasavica river was formed from the subterranean waters from the Drina and from several streams, most notably, Duboka Jovača and Prekopac canal (gravitationally, from the Cer mountain). The final section connecting Zasavica and Sava has been channeled (Bogaz canal). The river slowly meanders into and through the bog, widening from 50 metres (55 yd) to almost 300 metres (330 yd). The marsh, consisting of several connected bogs, covers an area of 11.5 square kilometres (4.4 sq mi). During normal water levels, the bog is 2.5 metres (8.2 ft) deep on average, but it can get up to 10 metres (33 ft) deep. The marshland's altitude varies from 76 to 82 meters (249 to 269 ft). The entire biotype includes also the Batar stream and several other canal-tributaries to Zasavica, and consists of an ecological row of water and marsh systems with fragments of flooded meadows and forests. Through the Sava and Danube rivers, the Zasavica biotype belongs to the Black Sea drainage basin.

== Human history ==
Remains show that humans were already settled in the marshy areas of Mačva in 5000 BCE. They made canals and water alleys in the marsh, using them both for irrigation and drainage. That way, they participated in the volatile process of constant change of the Sava and Drina rivers directions, creation of meanders, and change of the landscape. Time erased memories of the first recorded settlers and the remains of their work was attributed by the later settlers as the work of giants, creating one of two popular legends in Zasavica. Another legend connected to the area is that of winged dragons. Ancient Celtic maps show area of Zasavica as one of eight dragon-inhabited places in the Balkans.

From recent history, Zasavica is known as both the hiding place and a battle ground of Zeka Buljubaša, one of the heroes of the First Serbian Uprising. He was finally defeated and killed by the Ottomans in Zasavica in 1813.

In 2017–2020, a dozen sculptures of the animals which inhabit the reserve were carved and exhibited in the open, including beaver, umbra fish and donkey. They were made by the artistic team of archaeologist Zoran Đajić. In September 2020, a massive, 15-ton heavy sculpture of a "Serbian ox" was placed at the main entry. Celebrating importance of oxen in older Serbian history, the sculpture was carved from one slab of hard, ancient Brazilian stone, formed over 1 billion years ago. The sculptor is Velimir Karavelić.

== Preservation ==
Special reservation of nature of Zasavica was formed in 1997 and placed under the state protection as the category I natural treasure of exquisite value. It includes the bog and surrounding terrains, with a total area of 18.25 square kilometers. Of that, 6.75 square kilometres (2.61 sq mi) or 37% is placed under the level I of protection and the rest is in levels II and III. The majority of the protected area covers the water surfaces of the rivers and canals Zasavica, Jovac, Prekopac and Batar. Zasavica has a priority nomination to become a Ramsar site. It is proclaimed an Important Bird Area and since 2001 it is a member of the Europark Federation, federation of the national parks of Europe.

== Wildlife ==
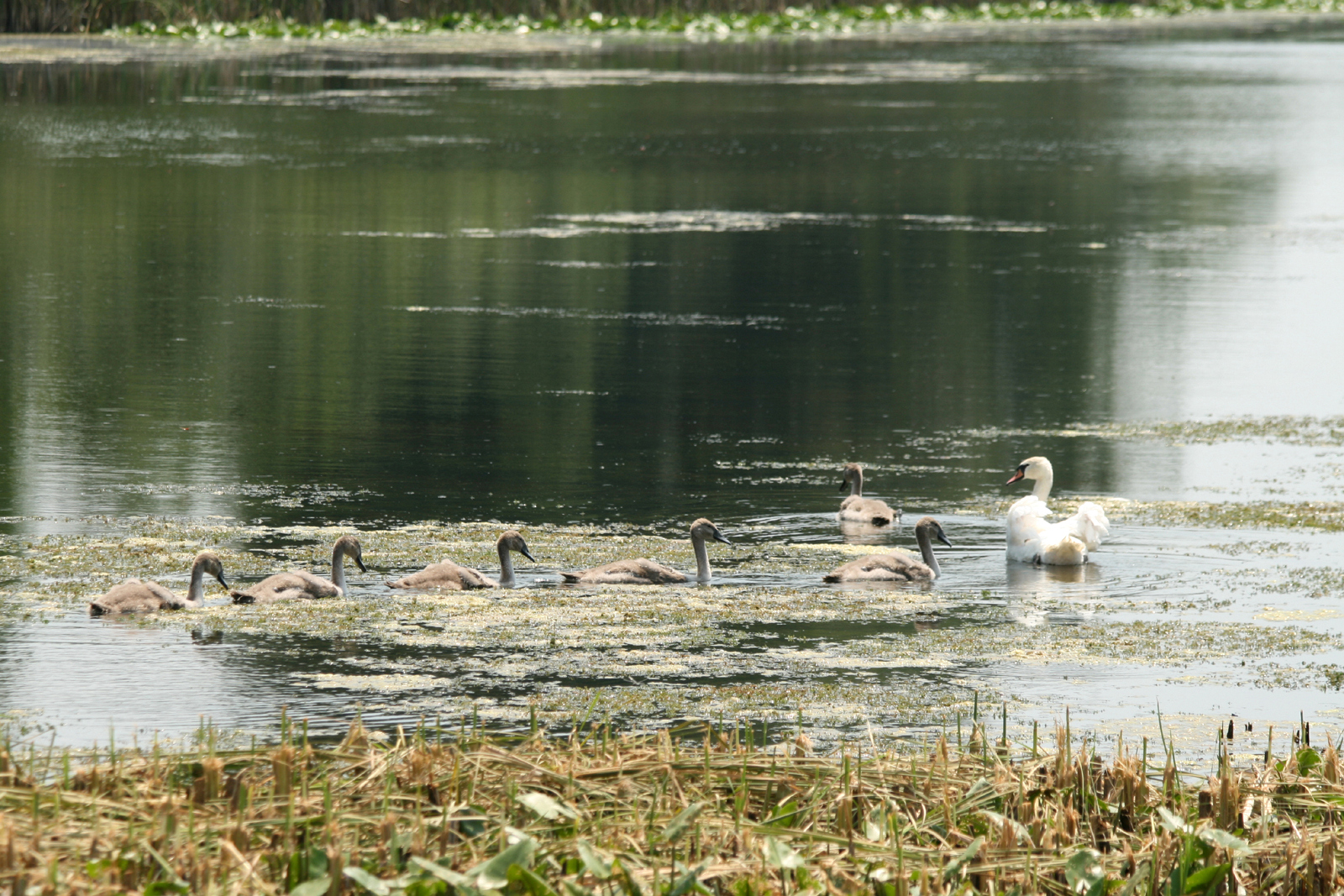
Mute swan

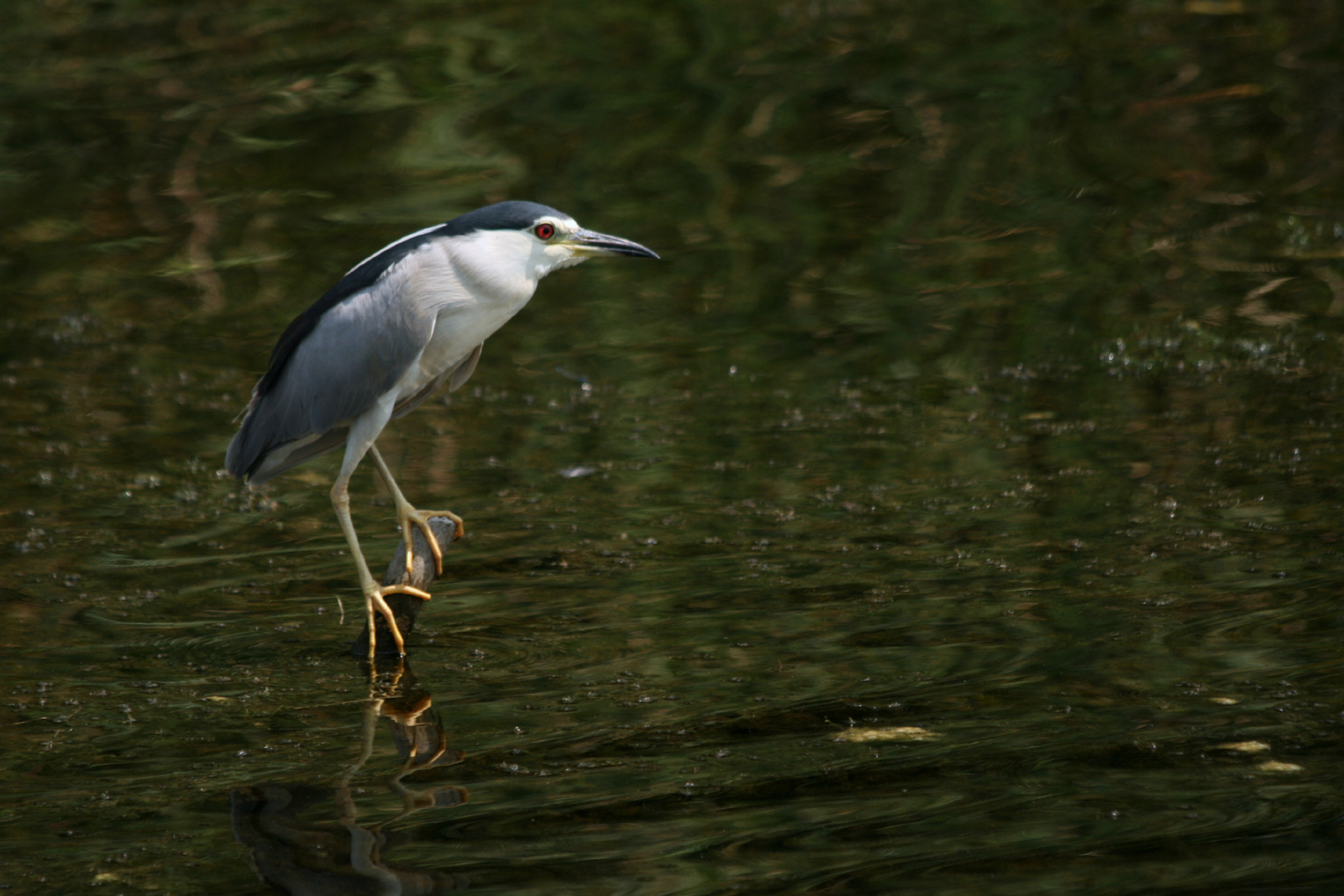

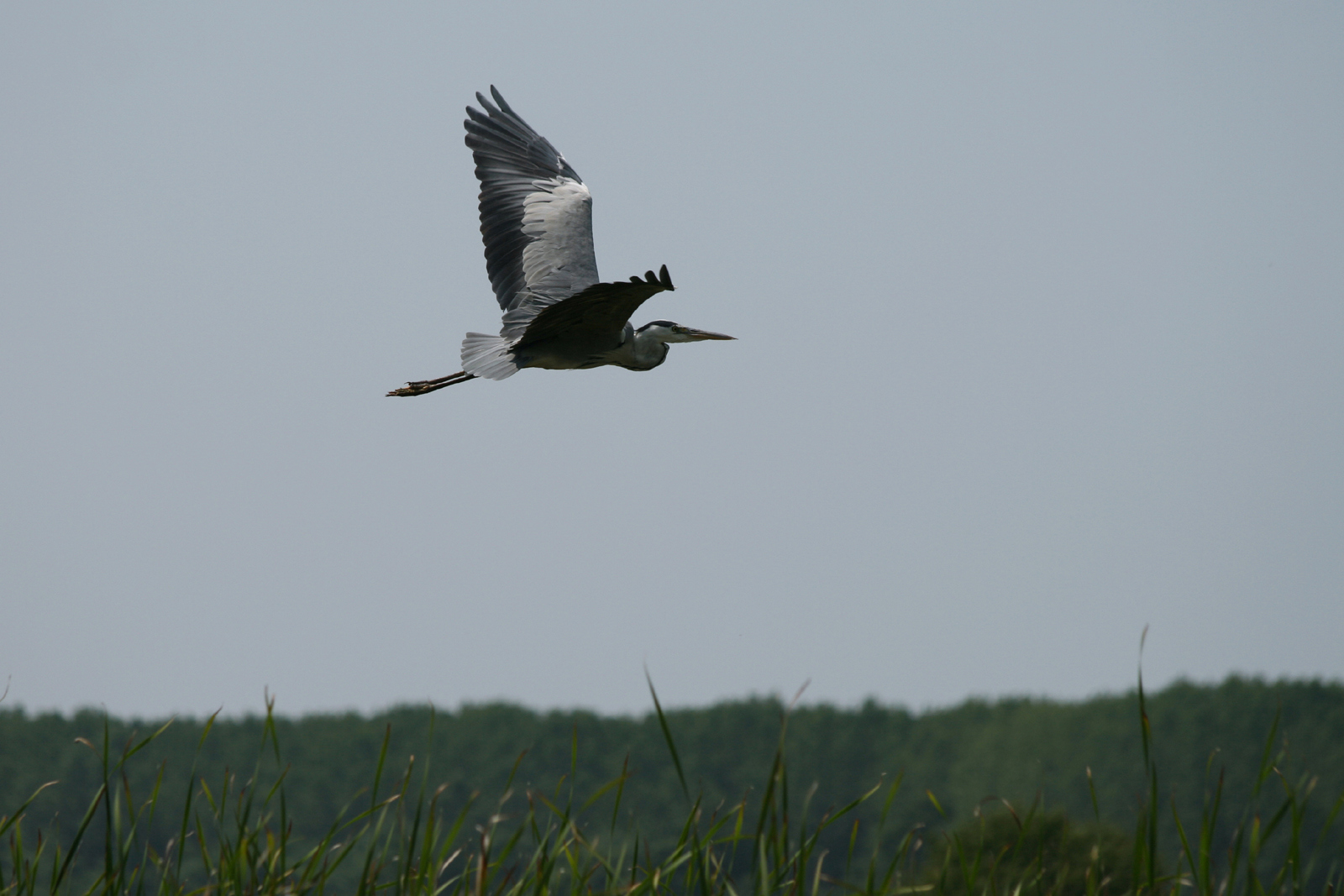

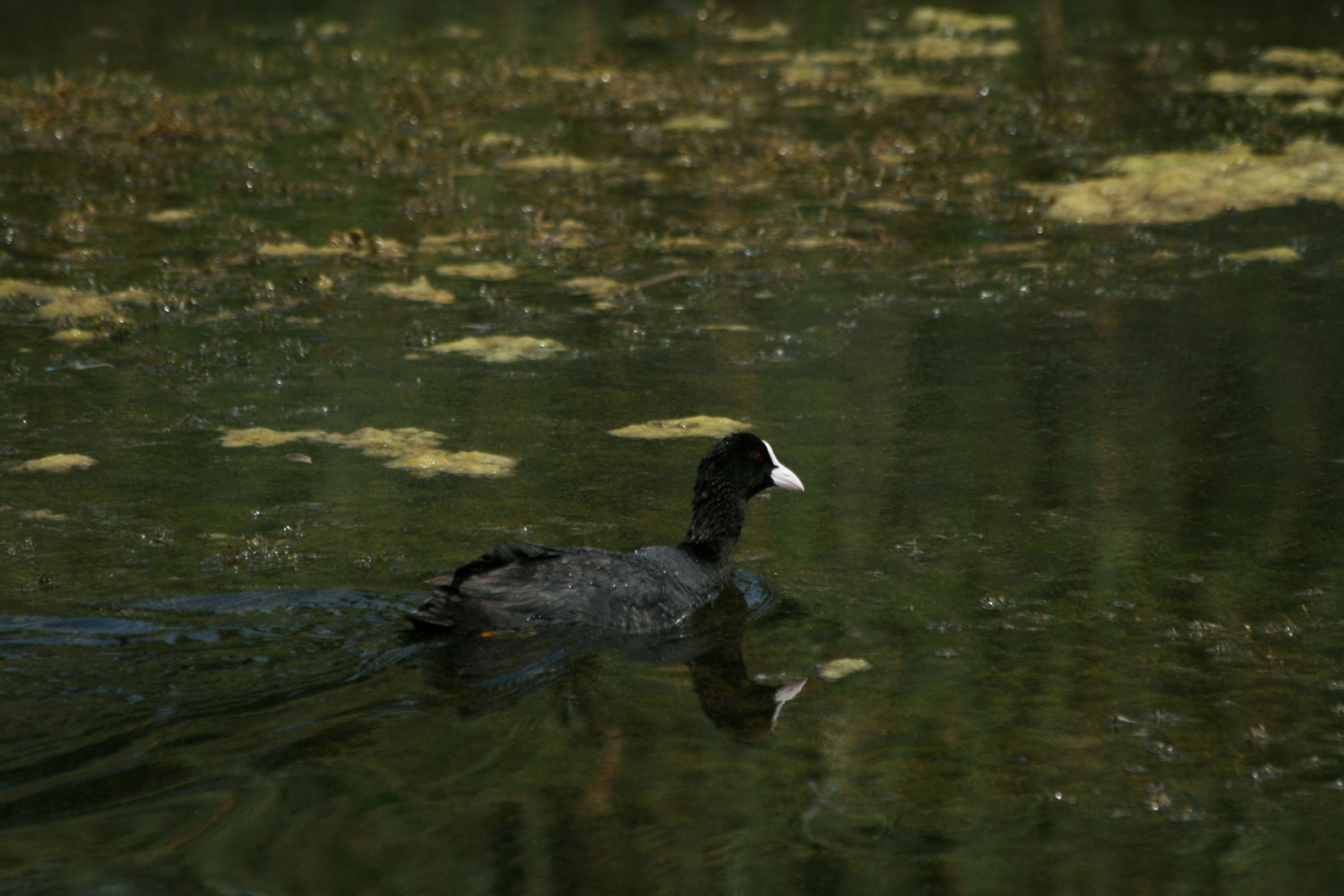
Eurasian coot

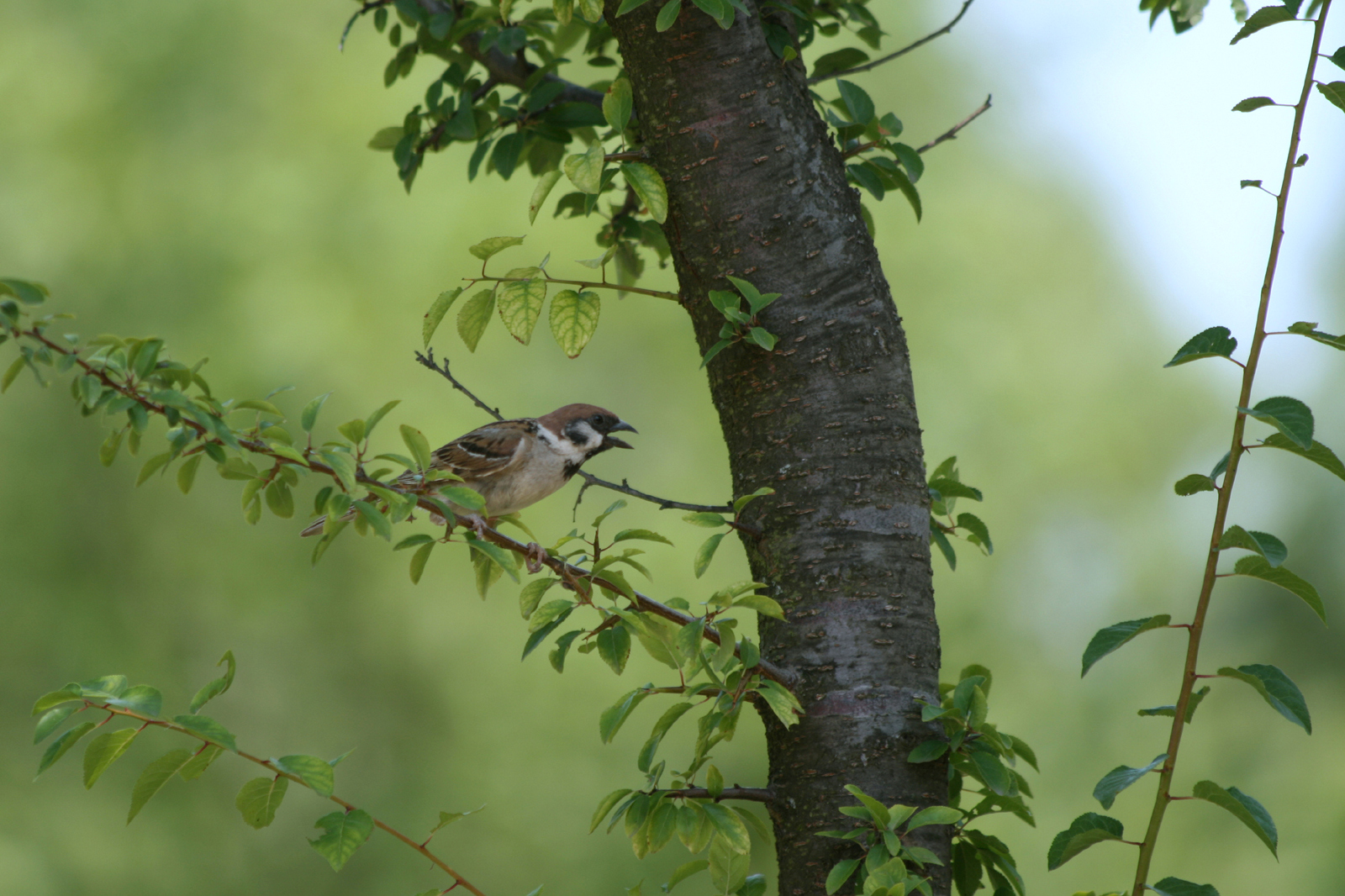
Great reed warbler

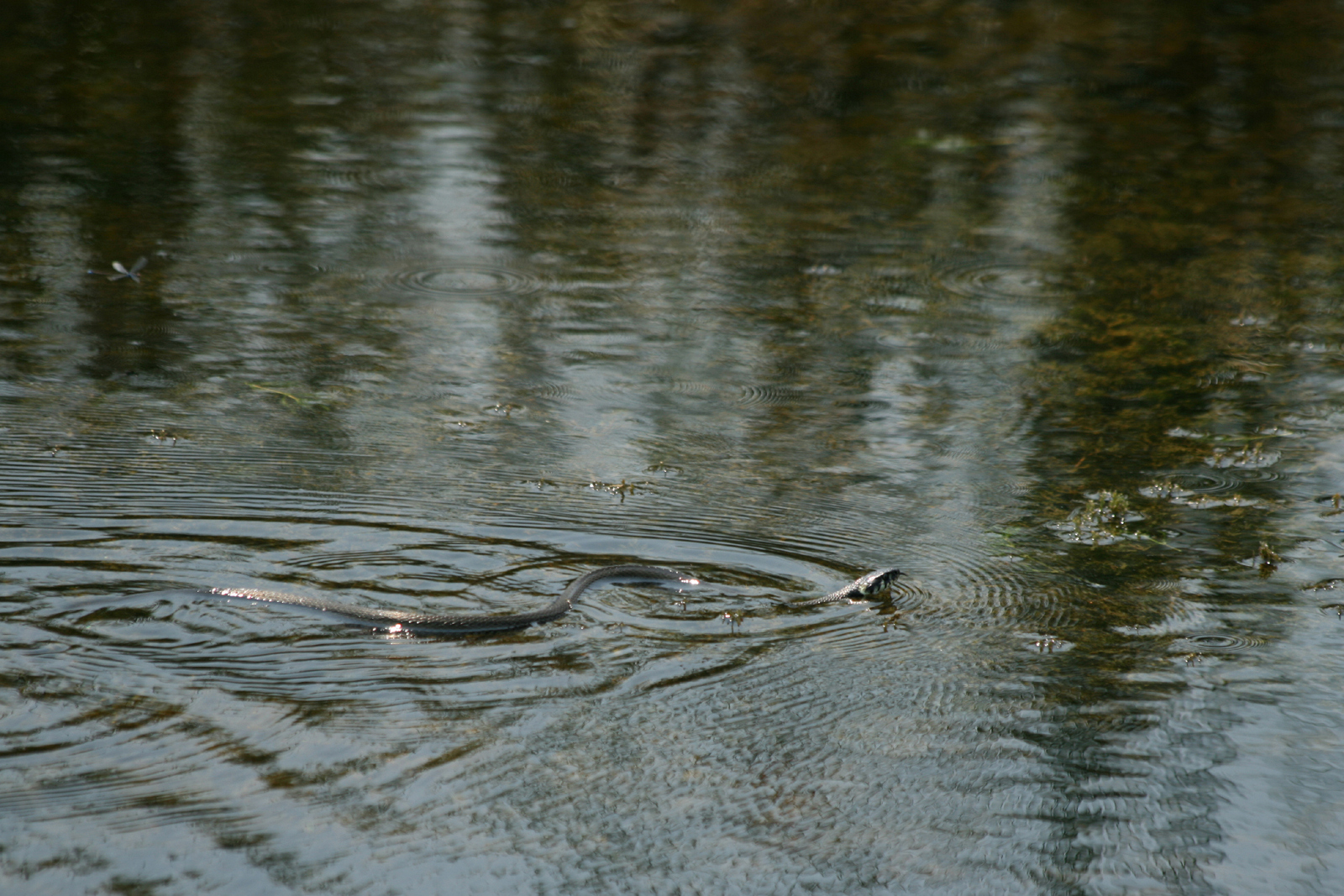
Grass snake

=== Plants ===
==== Flowering plants ====
There are over 600 species of plants recorded in the reservation. Several of them are endangered natural rarities and listed in the Serbia's Red Book of Endangered Species: European white water-lily, yellow waterlily, water soldier, fringed water-lily, marsh nettle, sweet flag, aquatic bladderwort, triangular club-rush, common mare's tail, water violet, greater spearwort and the endemic Pannonian plain species of Pannonian cornflower. In the Valjevac section of Zasavica, a rare and endangered marshland bio-community Acoro-Glyceretum maximae is found. The white orchid is also found in Zasavica.

==== Fungi ====
150 species of fungi are widely distributed in the entire reservation, in every ecosystem (ground, trees, logs, meadows, and pastures). Many are edible, including rare species of morel. Poisonous mushrooms are rare and few, including the panther cap, death cap, and yellow-staining mushroom.

==== Trees ====
Although dozens of species of trees are found, the forests, which make up 16.74% of the reservation, mainly consist of narrow-leafed ash and to a lesser extent white poplar, willow, or black alder. Species on the alluvial slopes include pedunculate oak, European hornbeam, linden, and European Turkey oak. In 1962, a 1.1-square-kilometre (270-acre) plantation of willow and hybrid poplars was planted.

=== Invertebrate ===
==== Plankton ====
Phytoplankton is represented with 234 species and zooplankton with 220. Representatives of the first group are the Batrachospermum algae, fresh water sponge (Spongilla lacustris) and fresh water jellyfish (Craspedacustra sowerbii). Out of the second group, 21 taxa are new and recently discovered in Serbia.

==== Insects ====
250 species of insects live in Zasavica and 15 of them are protected. There are several rare species of longhorn beetle (out of 35 living in Zasavica) and endemic Balkan species including three recently discovered in Serbia: Syrian longhorn beetle (Arhopalus syriacus), Morimus asper and Agapanthia lais. Species of Cerambyx cerdo and Morimus funereus are protected. Endemic and rare cricket Zeuneriana amplipennis, living only in Serbia, is also found.

=== Vertebrate ===
==== Fish ====
In Zasavica live 23 species of fish, categorised in 8 families and 20 genera. The most common are members of the carp family. Of those, 20 species ar autochthonous and three are imported (two from North America, one from China), though even the common carp had been introduced by Romans. Seven species are protected: Umbra krameri, Rhodeus sericeus amarus, loach (Misgumus fossilis), Cobitis tenia, etc. Six species are classified as endangered, five as vulnerable and six as rare. As part of the "Return of the autochthonous species of fish" project, the wels catfish has been reintroduced into Zasavica.

==== Herpetofauna ====
Zasavica hosts 27 species of reptiles and amphibians, of which all 12 amphibian and 4 reptilian species are protected and some of them are on the preliminary list to be included into the Red Book. Six amphibian and seven reptilian species are also classified as the endangered species by the Bern Convention. Two endemic Balkan species live in Zasavica: Danube crested newt and eastern sub-species of the sand lizard, Lacerta agilis bosnica, which is European Protected Species.

==== Birds ====
There are 185 species of birds in the reserve, of which 120 are resident. Because of such large number of birds, including rarities like night heron and spotted crake, Zasavica is included in the list of IBAs, (important bird areas). Since 1998, 20 artificial nesting platforms have been placed throughout the reserve. Other species include common moorhen, little grebe, Eurasian coot, great reed warbler, little bittern, mallard, common quail, white stork, black stork, Eurasian bittern, white-tailed eagle, western marsh harrier, common kestrel, mute swan, northern lapwing, etc.

==== Mammals ====
So far, 45 species of mammals are found in Zasavica. It is ideal for the water-bound species like Eurasian otter or wildcat, which are protected all over Europe. Otters were not spotted for years though. Recent but unconfirmed sightings of otters recently prompted the ecology organisations from Sremska Mitrovica to announce an award for those who capture otter on camera. Fur animals also live in Zasavica, most notably muskrat. Eurasian shrew, striped field mouse, fat dormouse and several species of bats are listed as rarities in Serbia.

== Special residents of Zasavica ==
=== Balkan donkey ===
Zasavica is the location of the only farm of the Balkan donkey on the territory of former Yugoslavia. The farm was founded in the early 1990s and holds some 120 donkeys. They are kept for meat but mostly for their milk, which is used to make the pule cheese, one of the most expensive in the world with the price of 1,000 euros per kilogram (there are farms of the Balkan donkeys in Italy, Belgium and France with over 700 animals). Meat is used for the sausages and kulen while the milk is also used in the cosmetic industry (creams, soaps) but for the cream liqueur, too. Every April, a festival called World's Donkey Day is held. Teams from several countries (Serbia, Hungary, Slovenia, Bosnia and Herzegovina, etc.) compete in the preparation of the donkey stew, while other meat and milk products are being exchanged and tasted.

=== Beavers ===
The main attraction in the reservation are the reintroduced beavers. Zoologist Alfred Brehm wrote in 1887 that a beaver has been spotted on the right bank of the Sava, near Sremska Mitrovica. Extinct in the early 1900s, four families with five members each, plus 11 single animals (31 in total) were reintroduced in 2004 with the help from the Bavarian Science Society. From Serbian side, project is conducted by the Biology Faculty of the Belgrade University. Each animal has a subdermal tracking microchip implant.

Initial fears that the beavers will not adapt proved to be groundless as very soon first dam was spotted and the animals began to reproduce. A dam is 30 metres (33 yd) long and 1.8 feet (0.55 m) tall (of that, 0.8 metres (2.6 ft) above the water) and located at the Batar's mouth into Zasavica. In the late 2006 a dam in the canal Glušci, which flows into the Zasavica, was discovered and the beavers, though not the dams, are spotted in the river of Jadar some 35 kilometres (22 mi) to the south down the Drina. As the area surrounding the Zasavica is entirely agricultural, farmers don't share the excitement of the biologists as they claim the beavers ruin their crops saying that was the original reason for their extinction a hundred years ago, though they were also hunted for the valuable fur and the meat which could be consummated during the religious fasting.

By 2012, beavers in Zasavica built 17 burrows and 6 dams, their population grew to a 100 and the chipped specimen have been caught near Šabac, Obrenovac and even Brčko, 135 kilometres (84 mi) upstream, in Bosnia and Herzegovina. Population found in Obedska Bara is a local one, being reintroduced in the same time and as the part of the same project as the Zasavica beavers. Initially knocking down the poplars and willows, causing damage to the surrounding arable land, after several years in which they adapted the habitat to their needs, beavers for the most part stopped being a nuisance to the local inhabitants.

By 2020 they spread all over the northern and western parts of Serbia. Apart from the Sava, Drina, and Jadar, they have been spotted in the Danube, Tamnava, Tisza, Bega, Timiș, Great Morava and canal systems in the Vojvodina province. To the north, they reached Petrovaradin and Novi Sad, while at the south they are spotted near Velika Plana. They also inhabited the surroundings of Belgrade, like Ritopek and Krnjača, which is part of urban Belgrade, but has much unurbanized area in the former marsh of Pančevački Rit.

=== Mangulica ===
Mangulica is the only surviving autochthonous Serbian breed of domesticated pig. Other two, Šiška and Šumadinka died out. A breed, also known as "woolen pig", due to its good qualities, is considered a "noble", but it almost died out in the 1980s. Its fat has up to 80% less cholesterol and triglycerides than a common, white pig. In 1998 Mangulica was introduced in Zasavica, but unlike Podolian cattle, they are left to roam free in the reservation, becoming feral since then. A cases of breeding with wild boar are known. By the early 2010s, their number grew to 1,000.

=== Podolian ===
In 1998 the cattle of the Podolian breed was introduced in Zasavica. First animals arrived in the spring of 1998 from Mionica, in western Serbia. Pasture "Valjevac", near the small Goransko-ribolovačko lake was chosen as their home. The pasture has an area of 3 square kilometers and numbered 80 cattle by 2011. Breeding of Podolian cattle is being part of the program for the preservation of the animal species, developed by the Serbian Ministry of agriculture.

In the reserve there are several other, today rare, breeds of domesticated animals: Buša cattle, Bosnian Mountain Horse and wooly goat.

=== European mudminnow ===
The European mudminnow (Umbra krameri, Serbian: mrguda) lives in Zasavica. It has been classified as an endangered species in the entire of Europe and placed under the strict protection by the Bern Convention. In Serbia it has been protected in 1993. In March 2008 the fish was discovered in the village of Bački Monoštor, near the town of Sombor, almost 150 kilometers north of Zasavica.

== Gallery ==
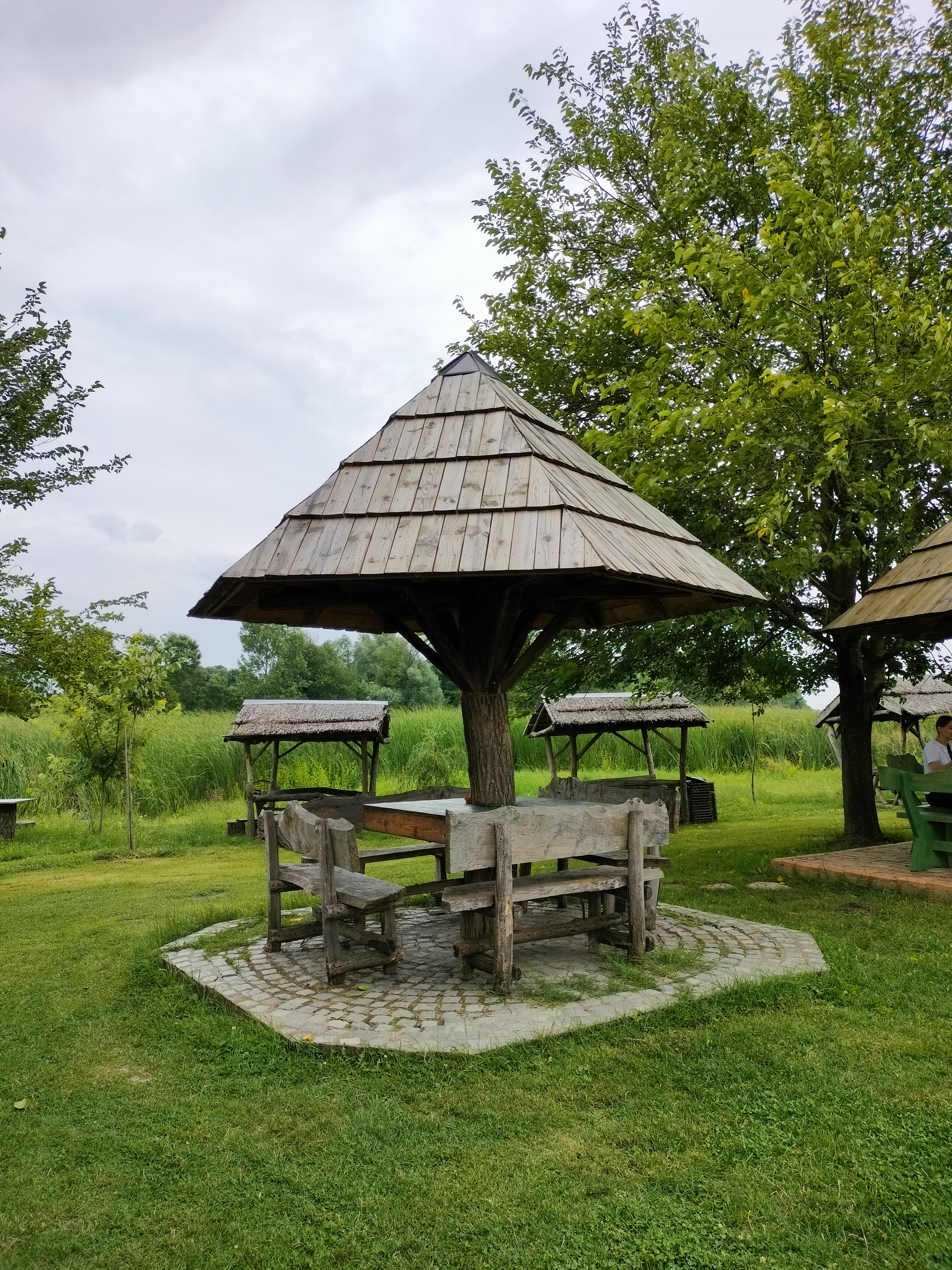

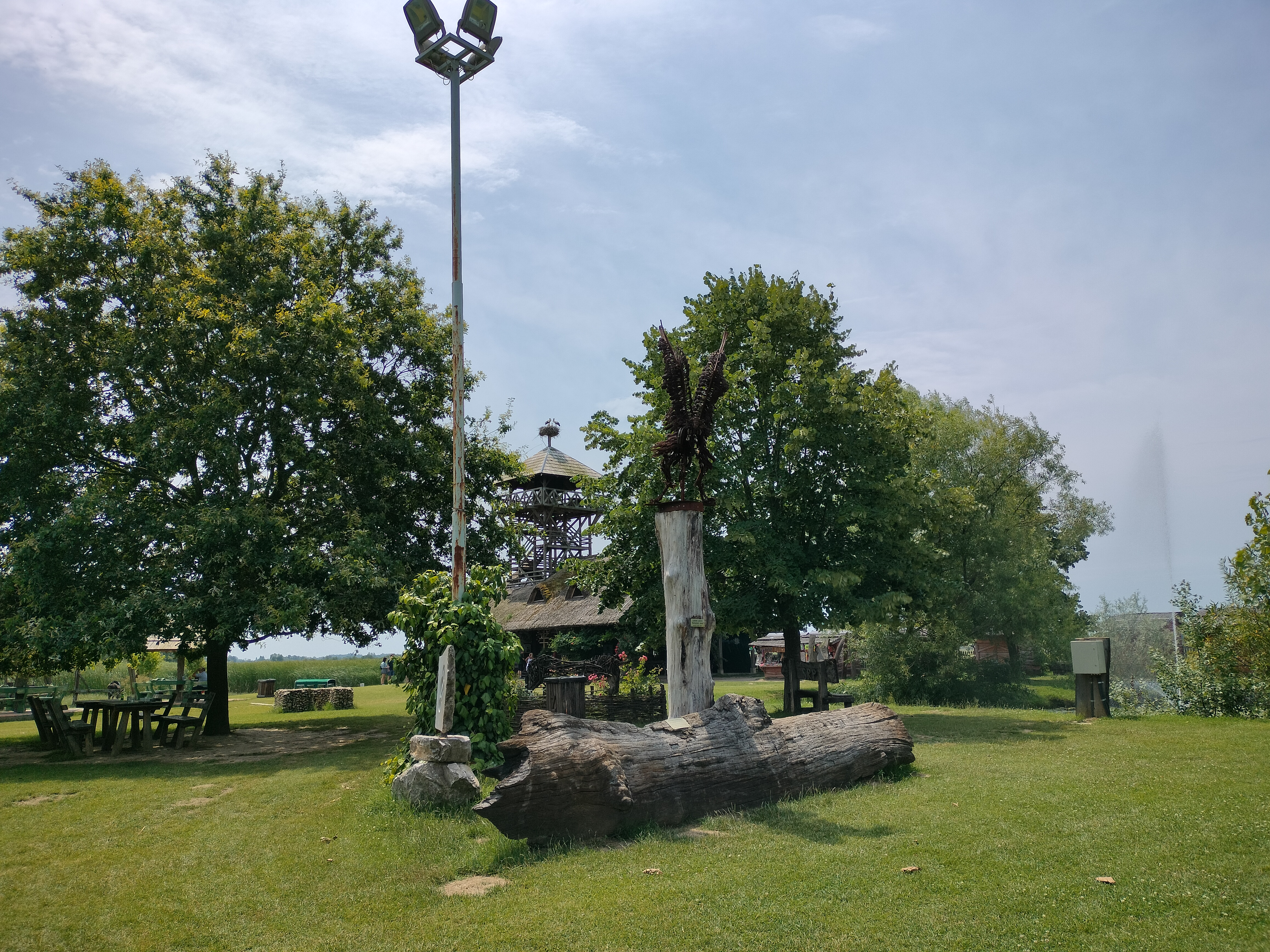

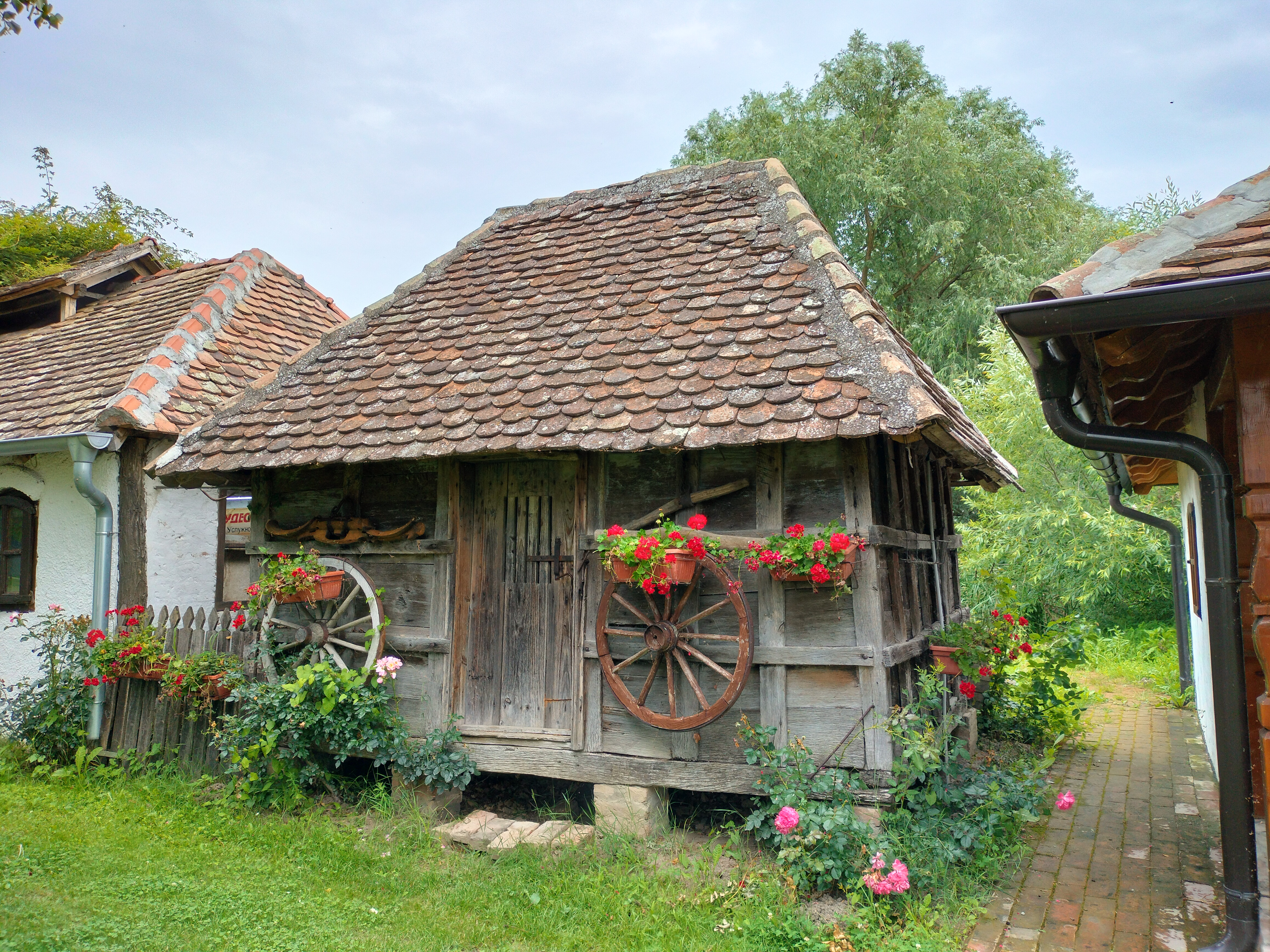

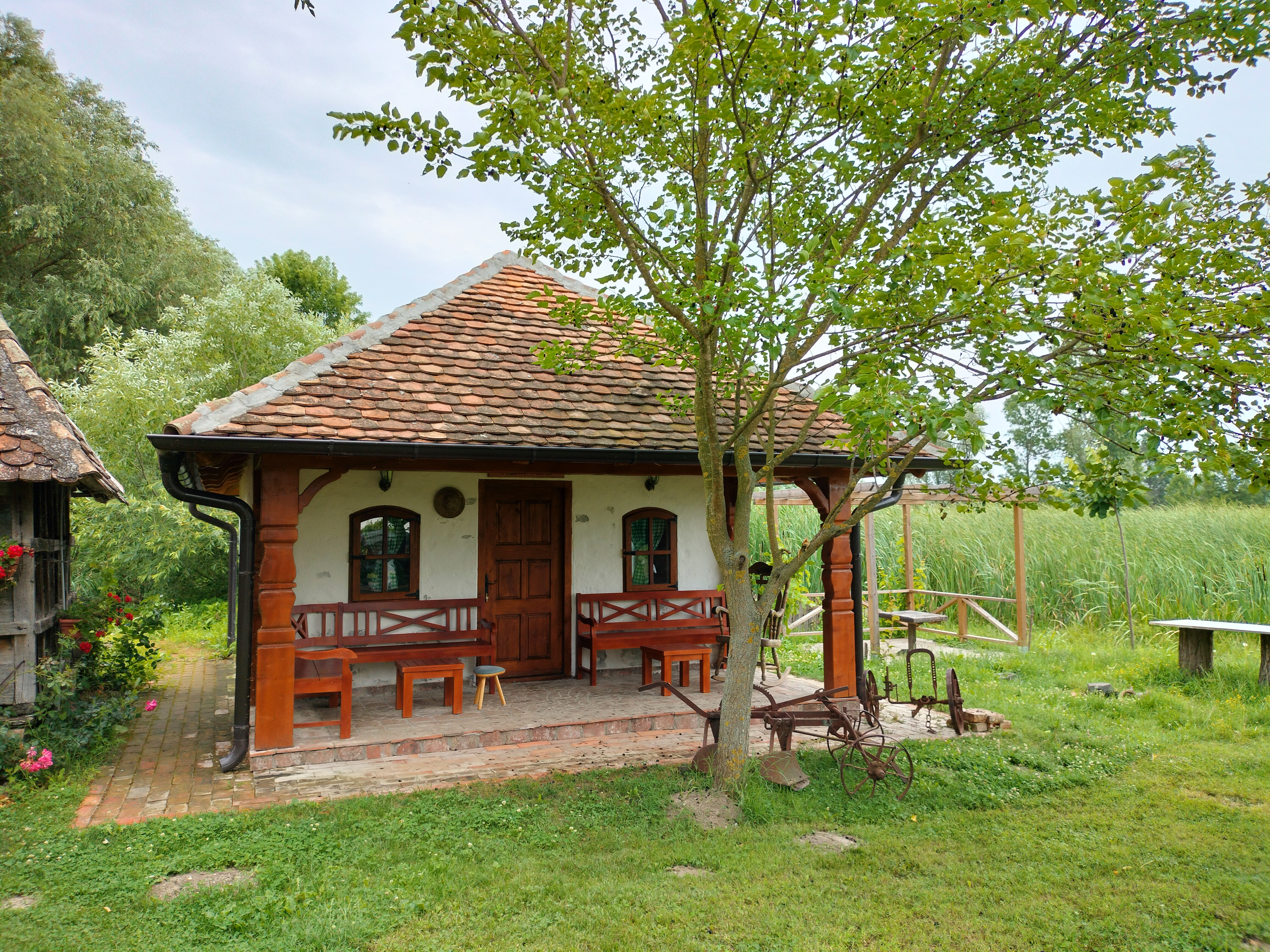

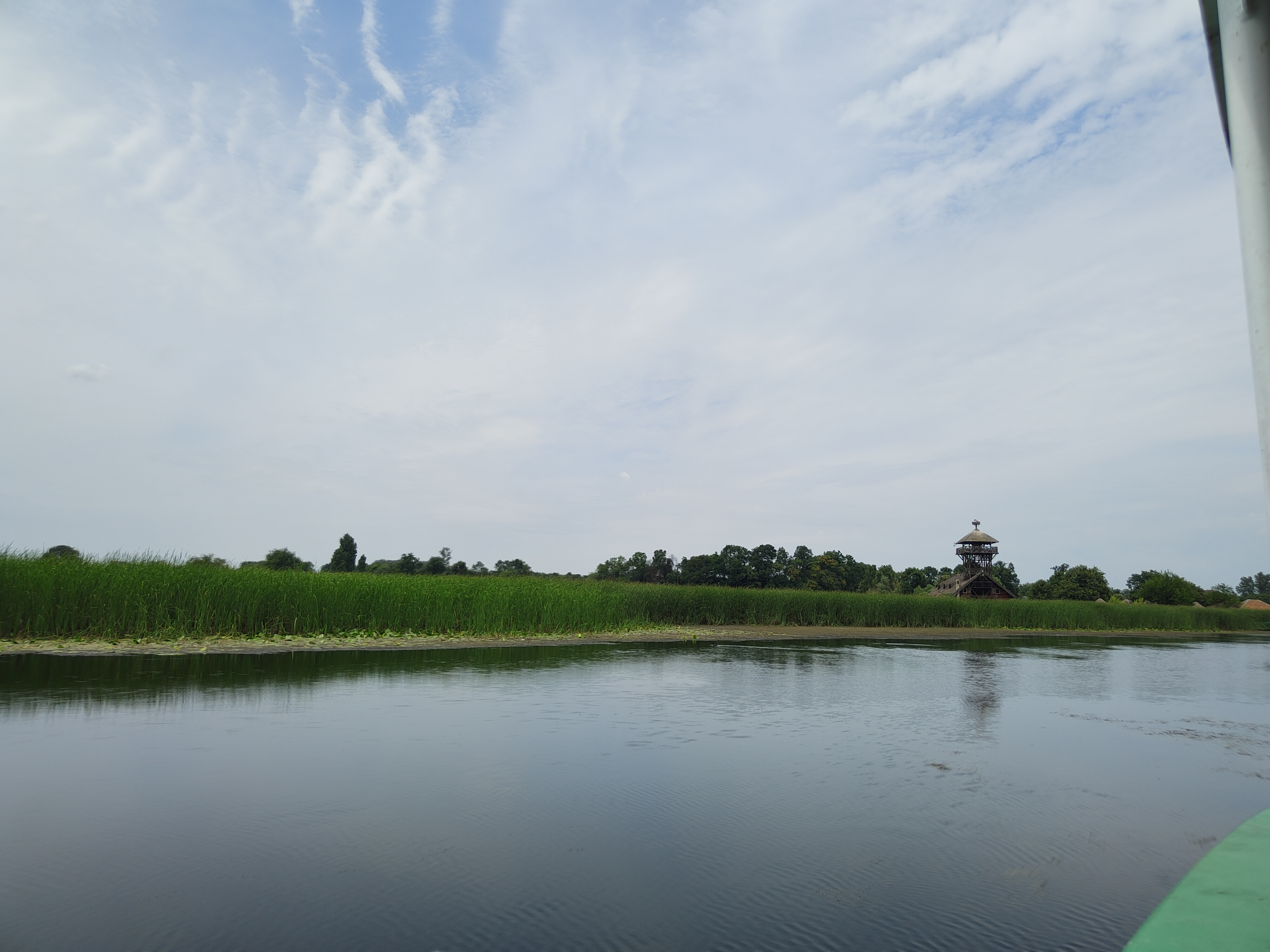

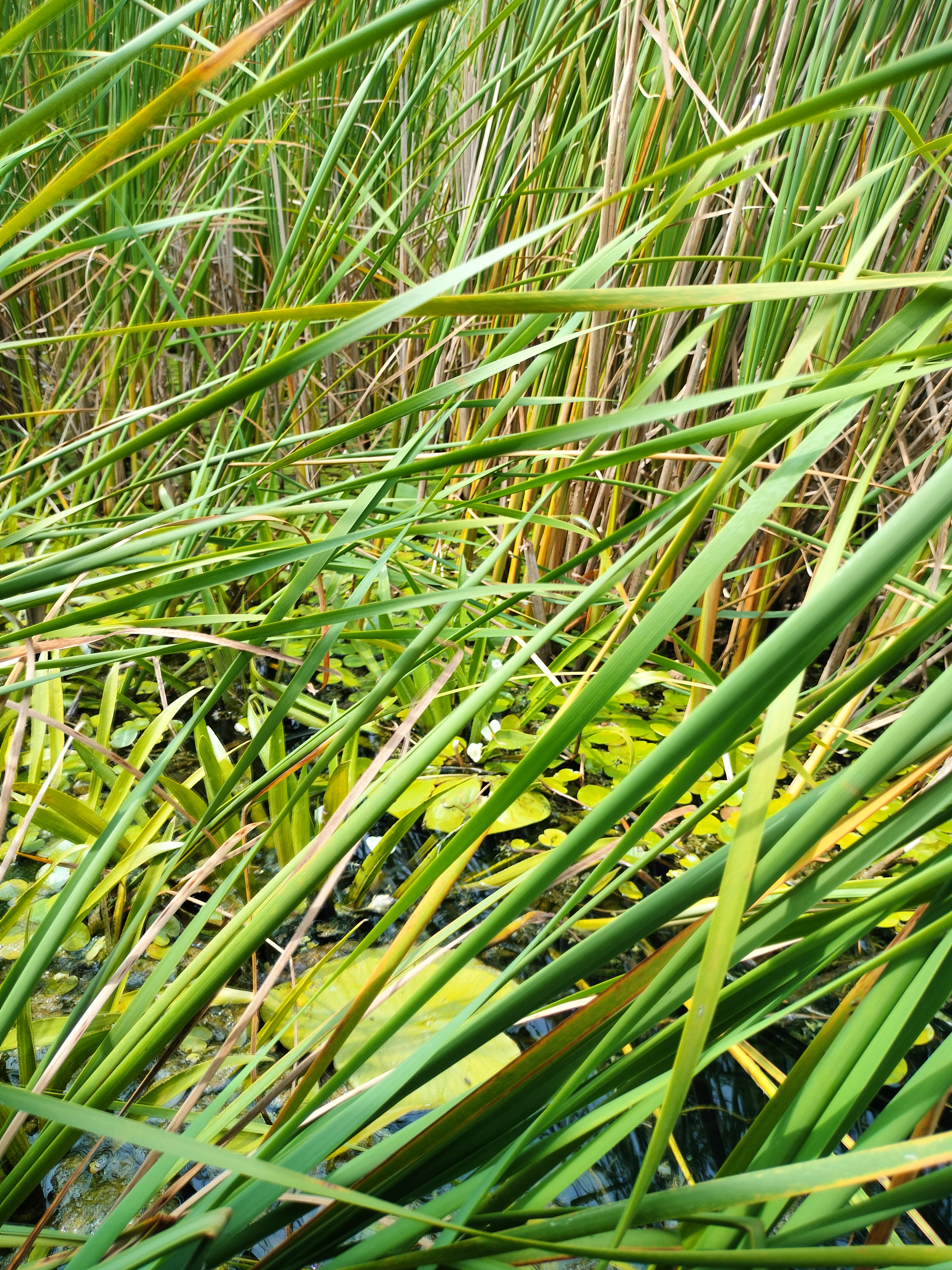

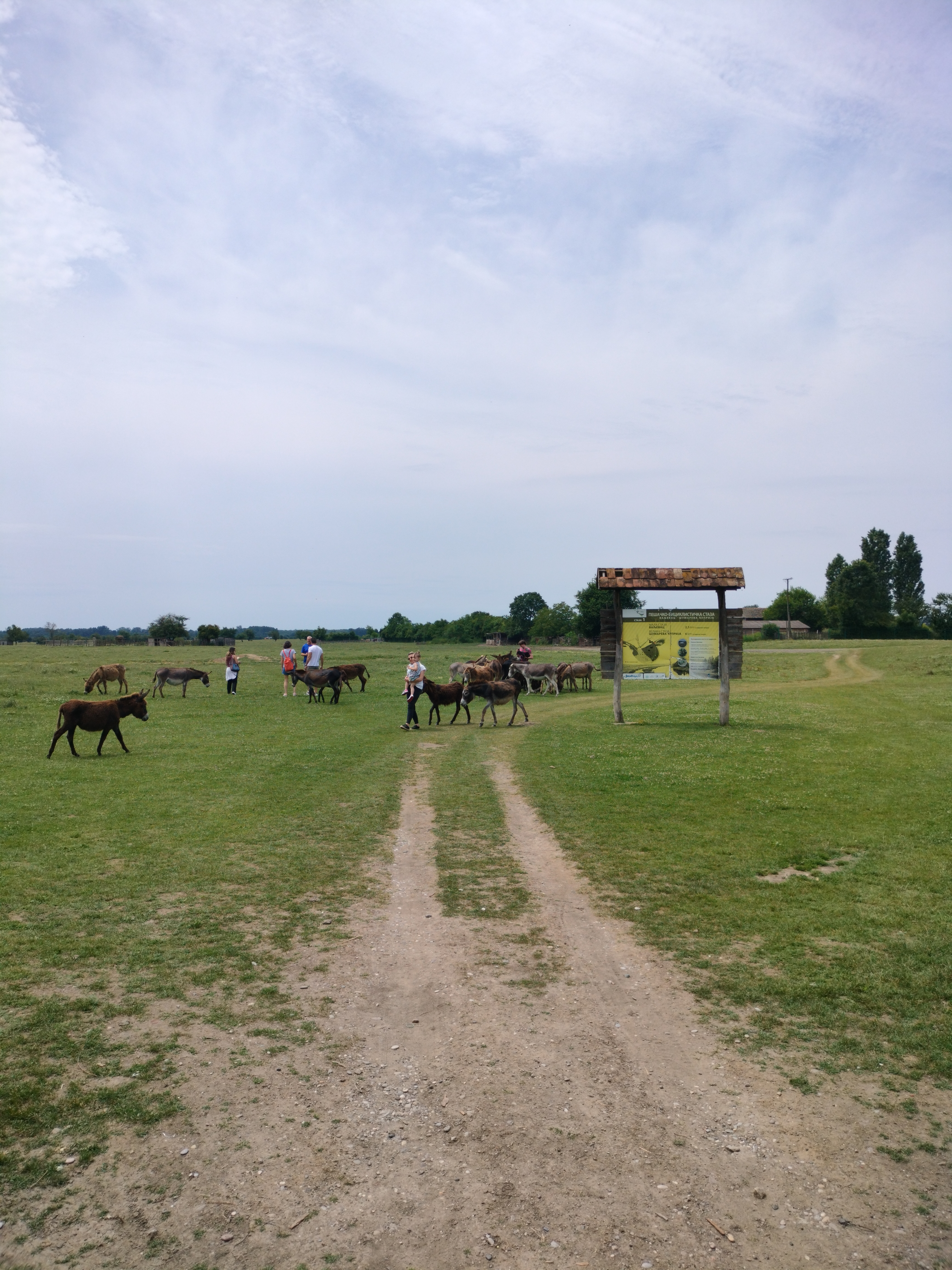

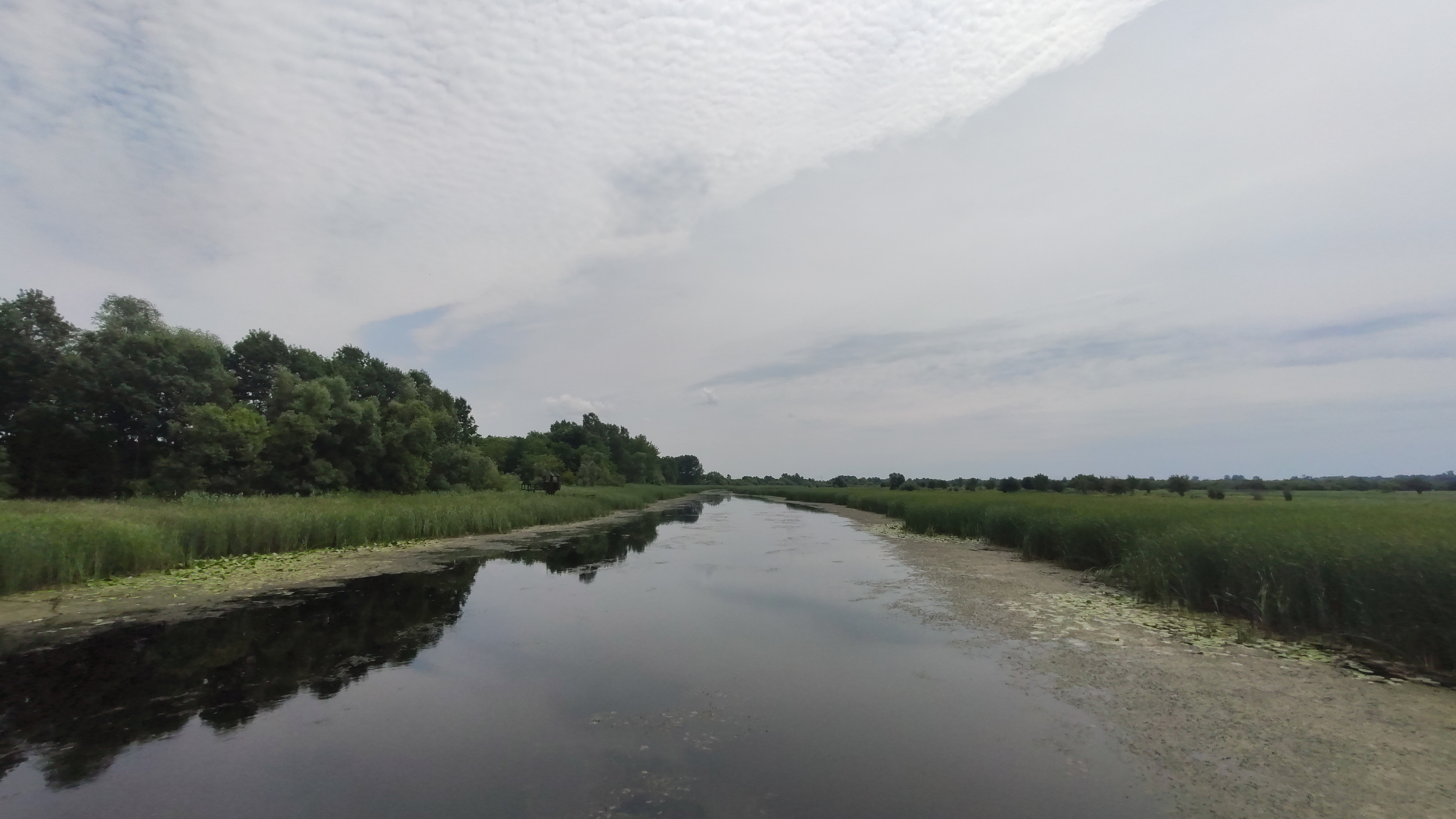

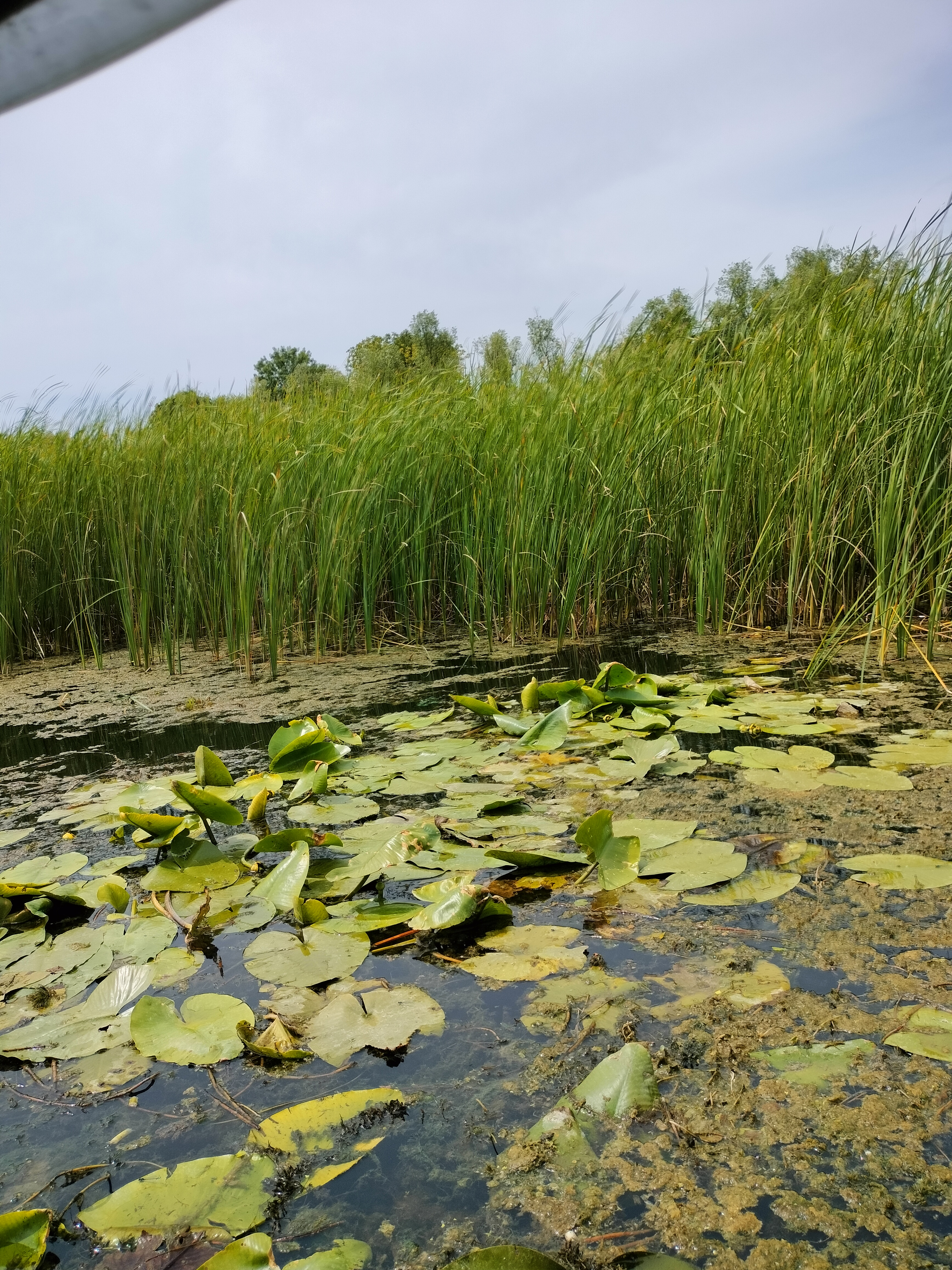

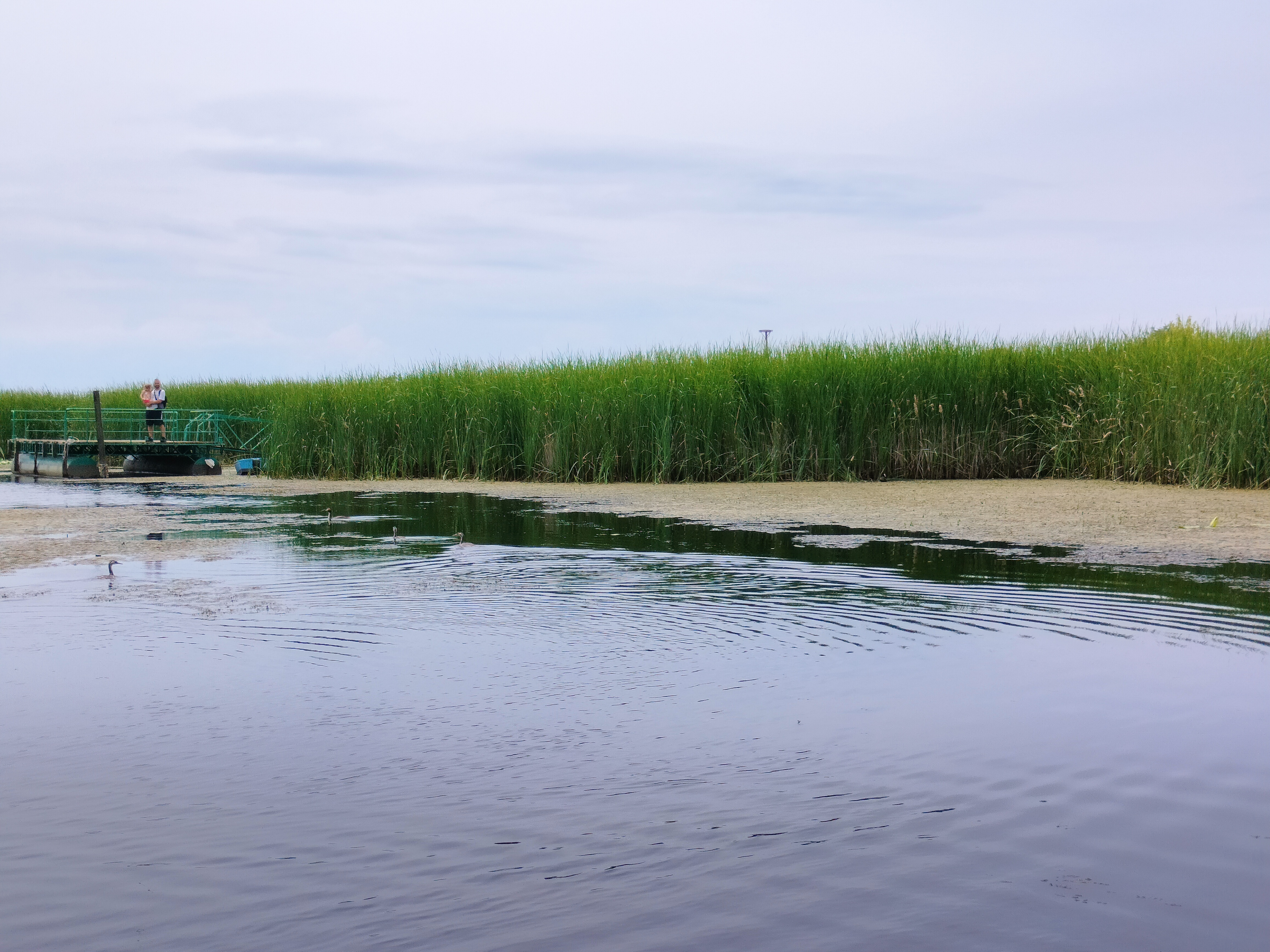

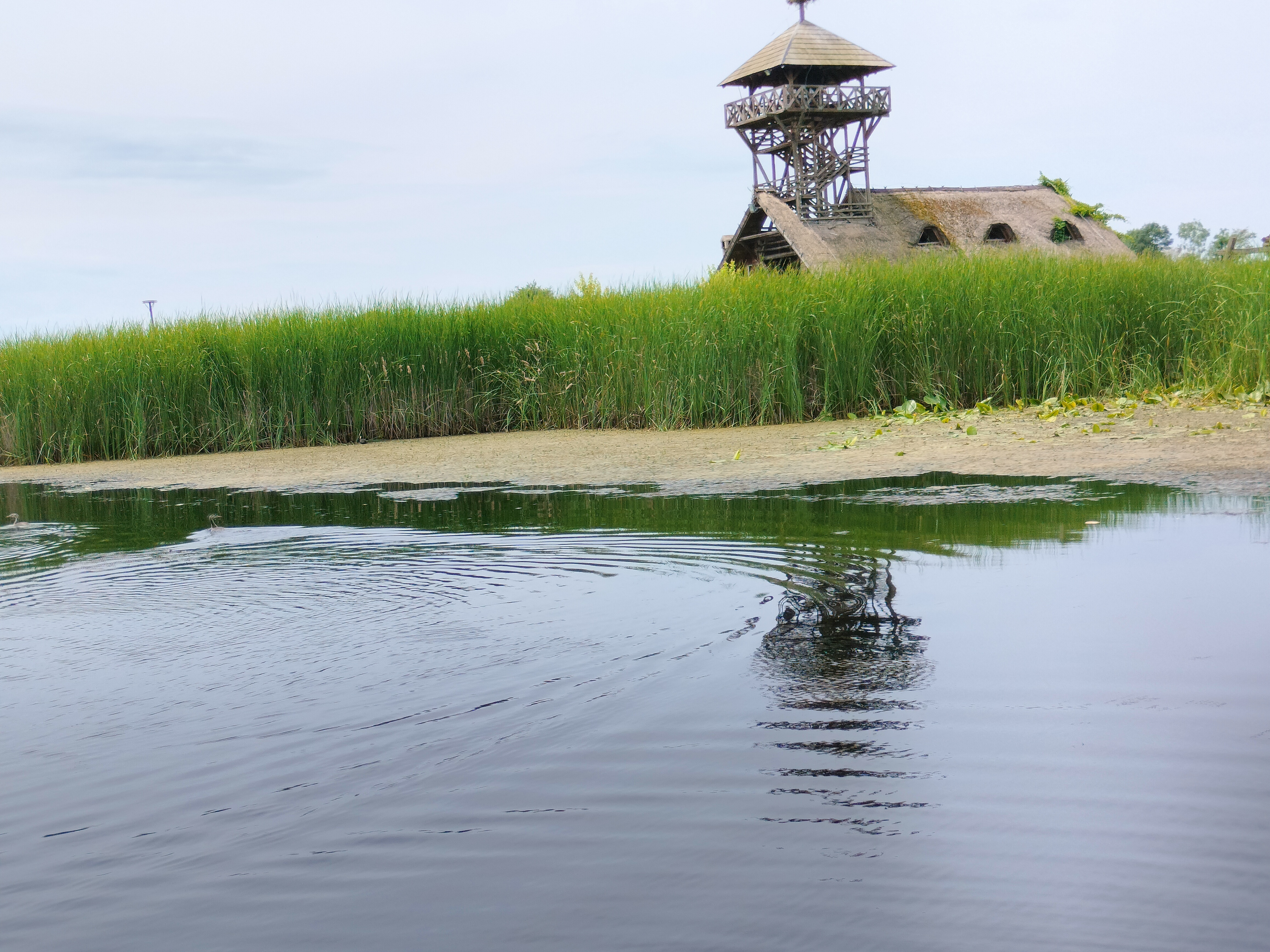

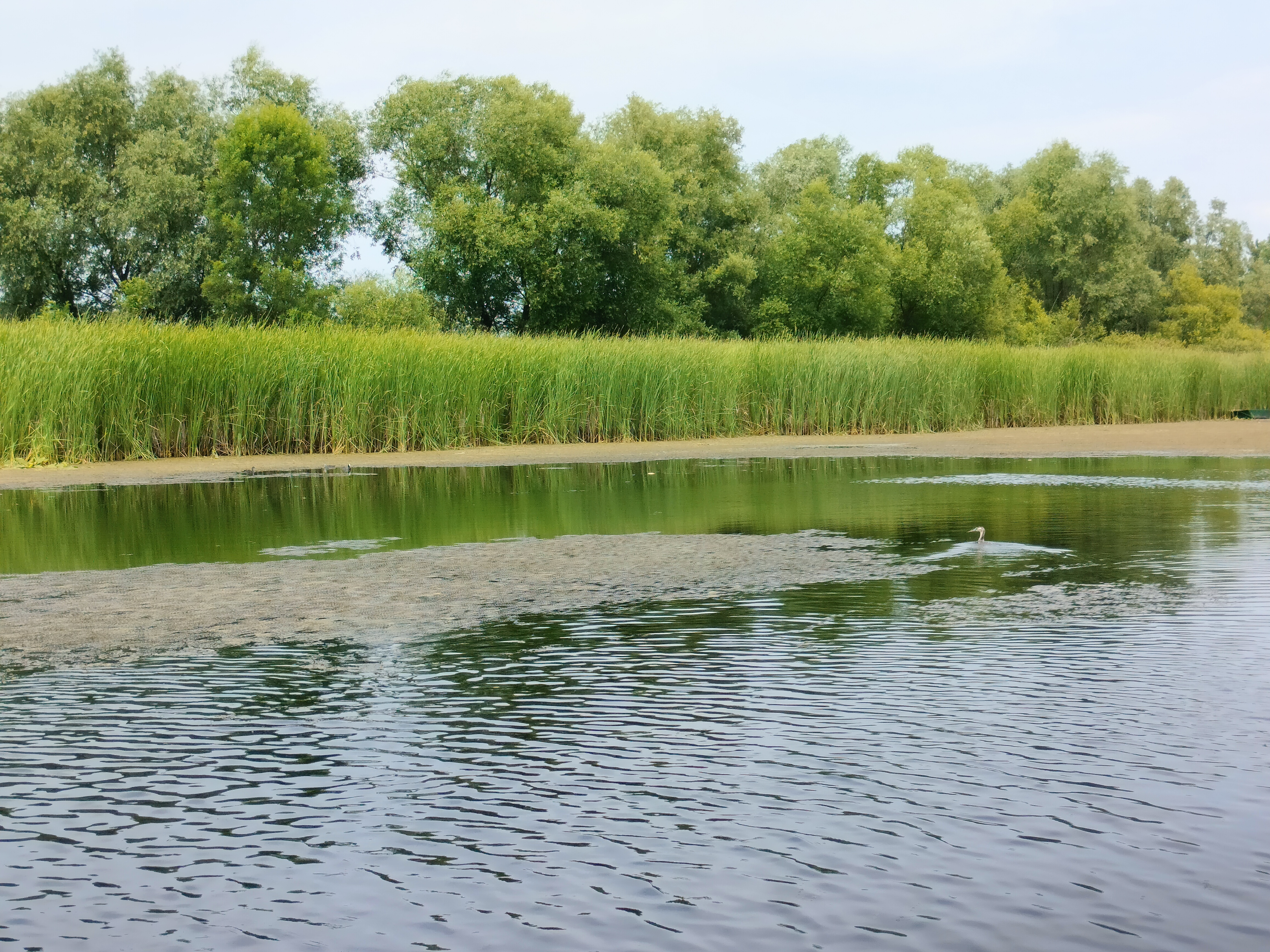

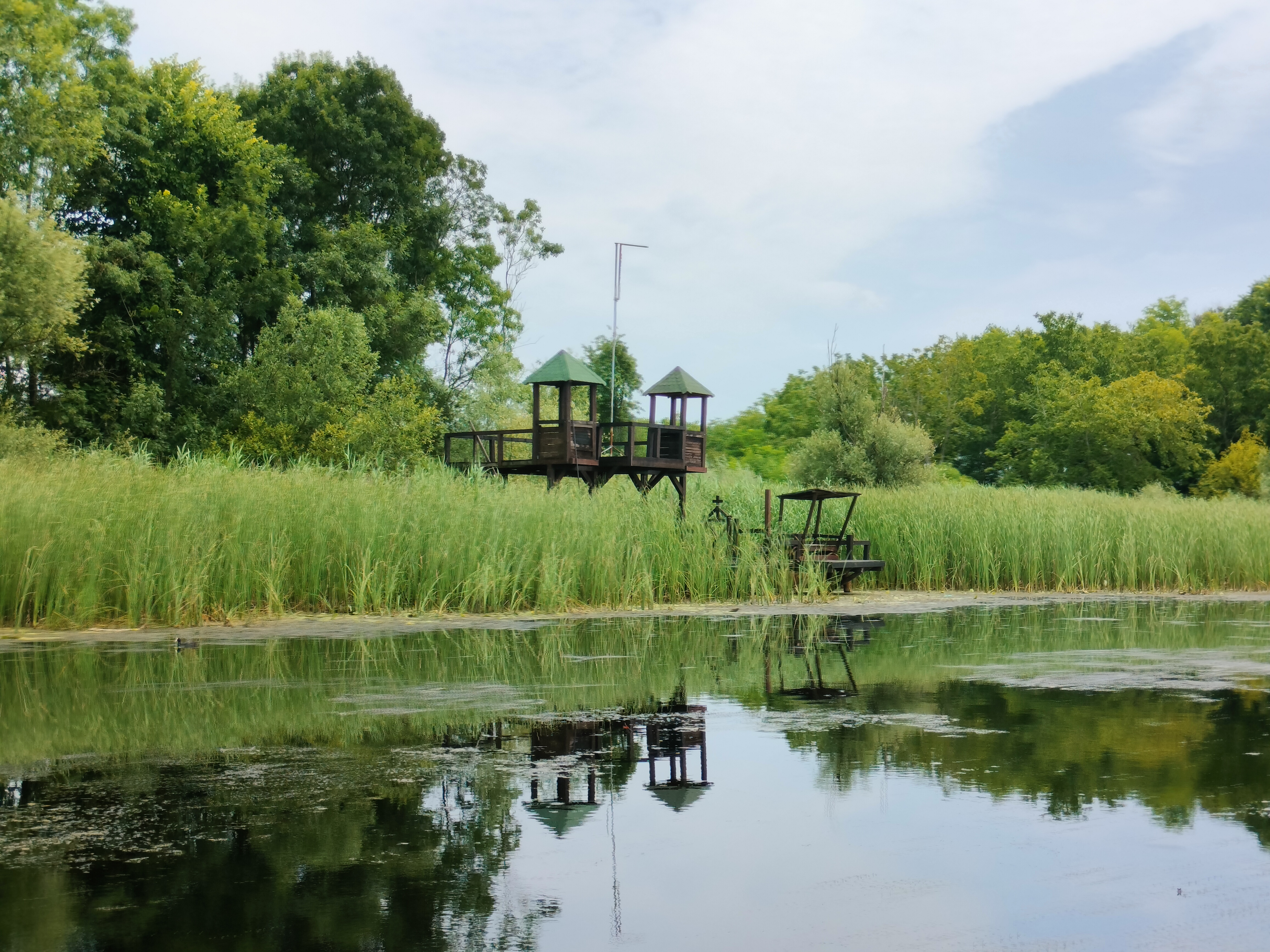

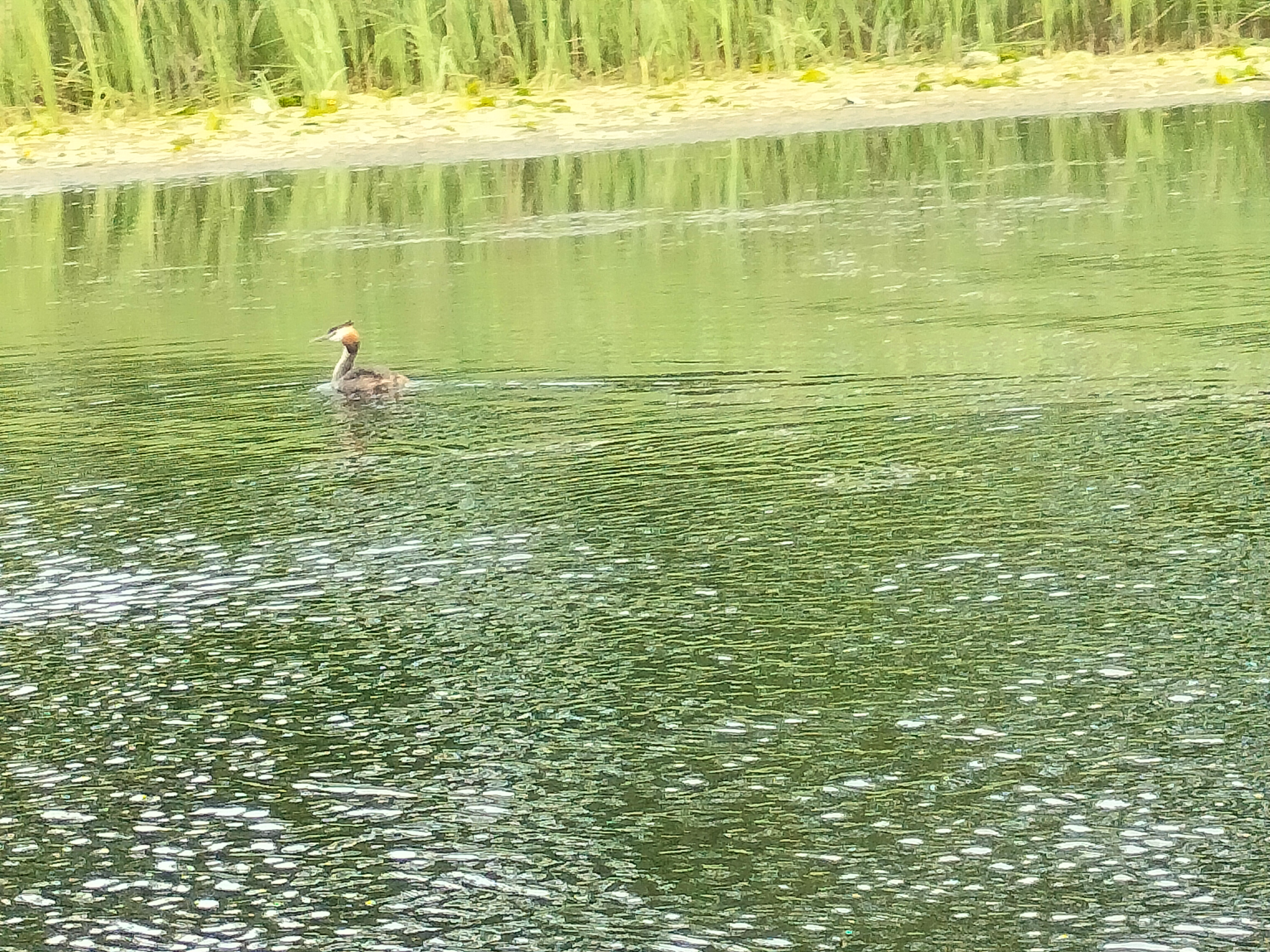

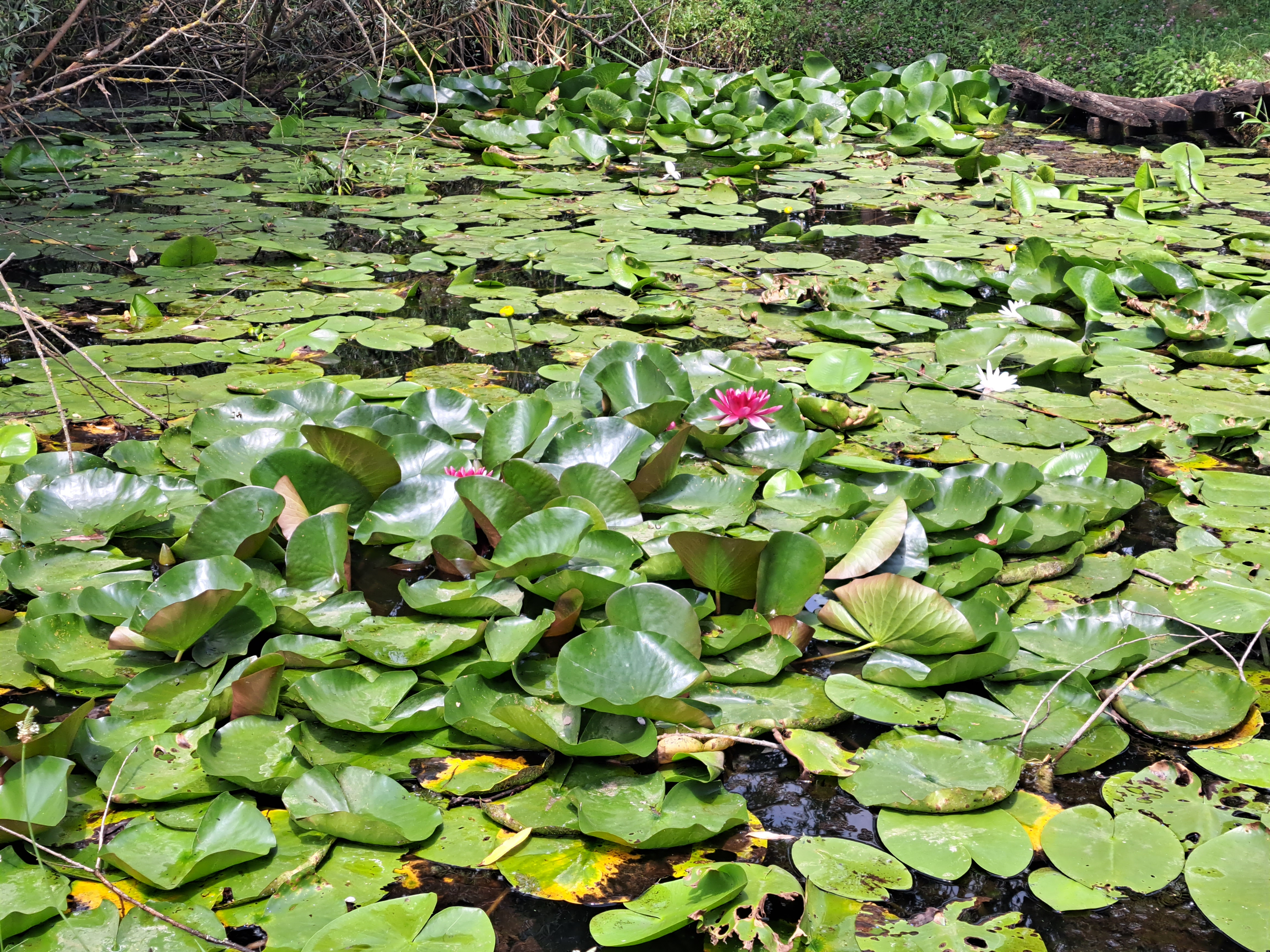

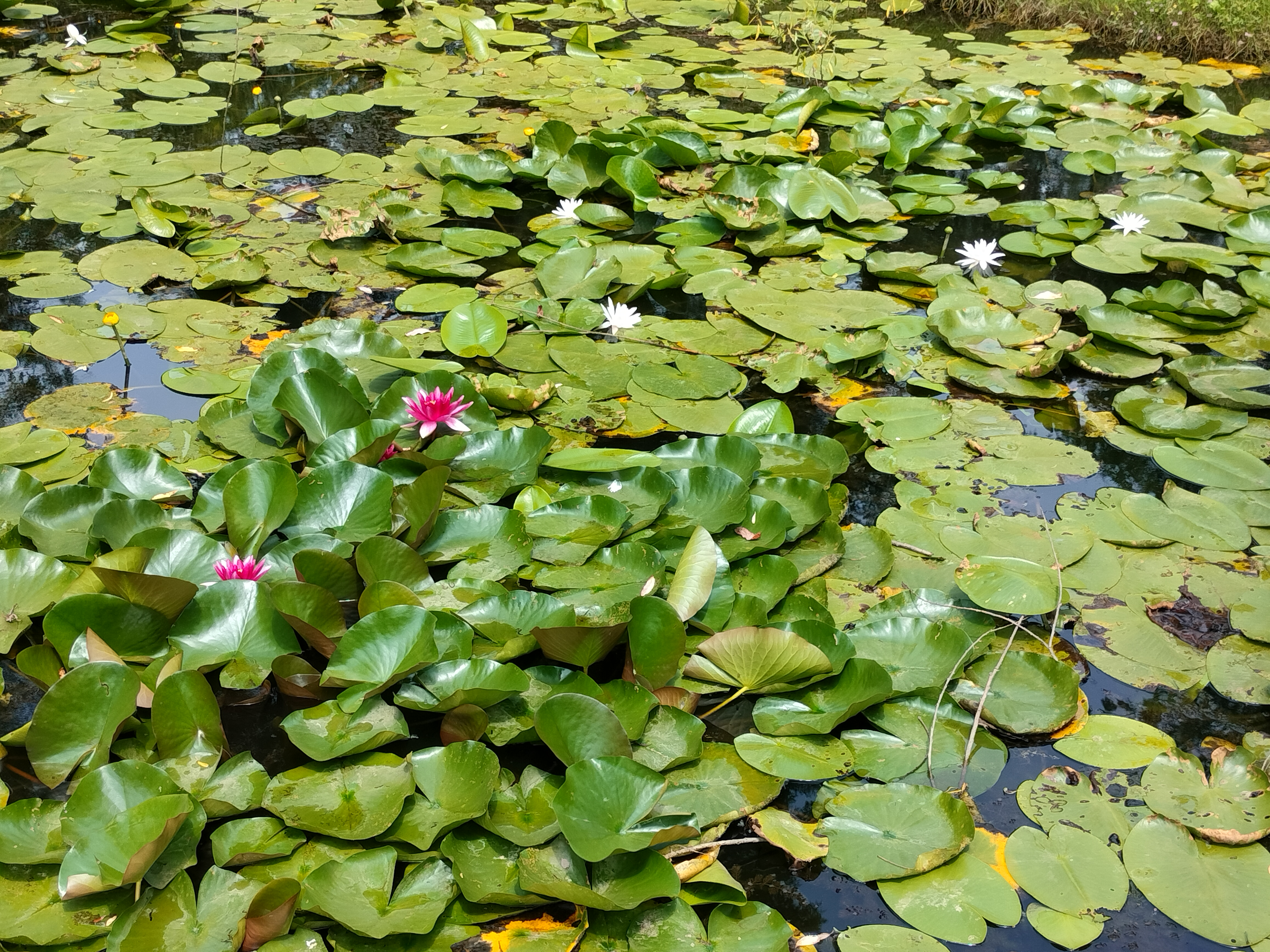

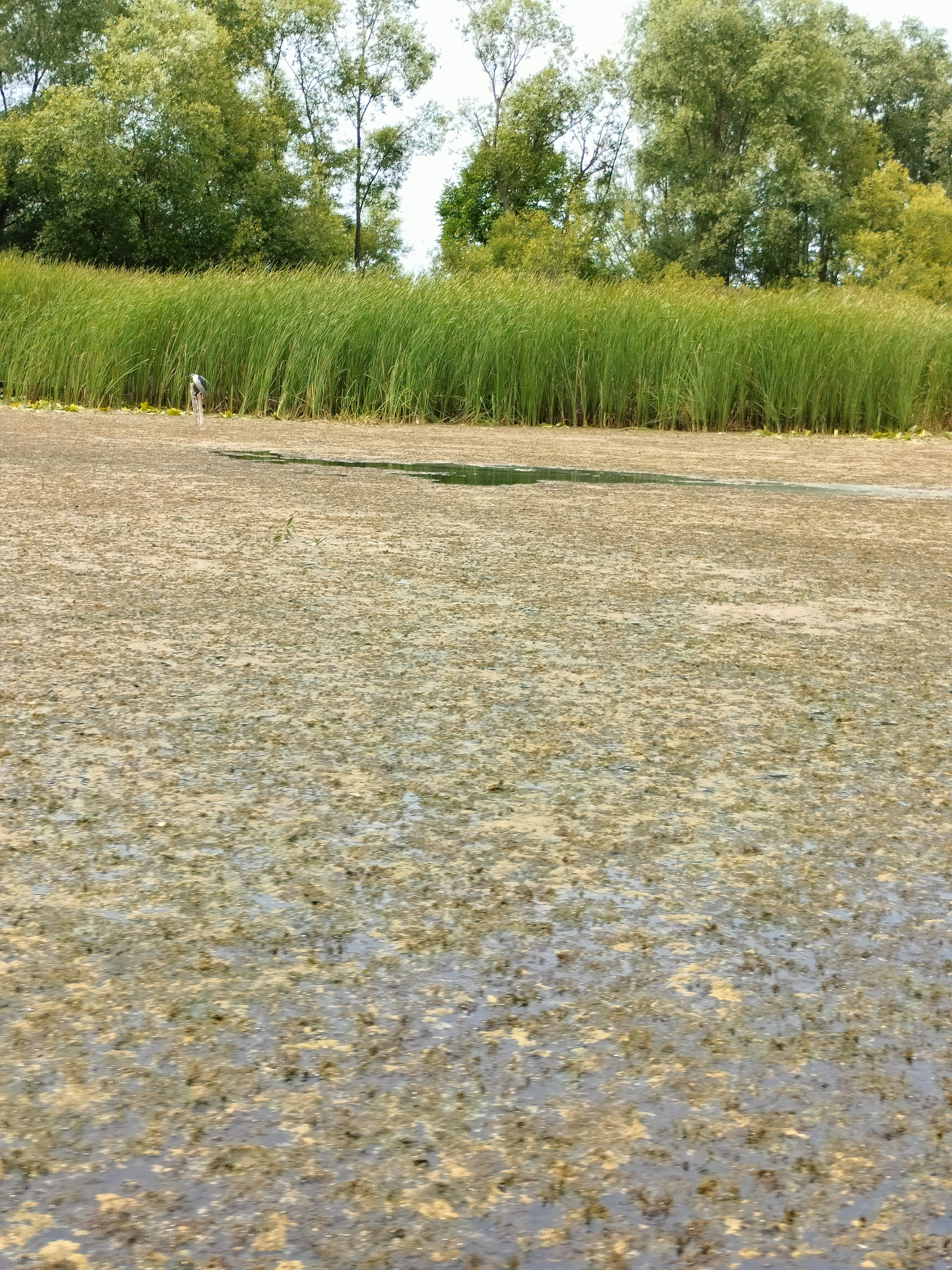

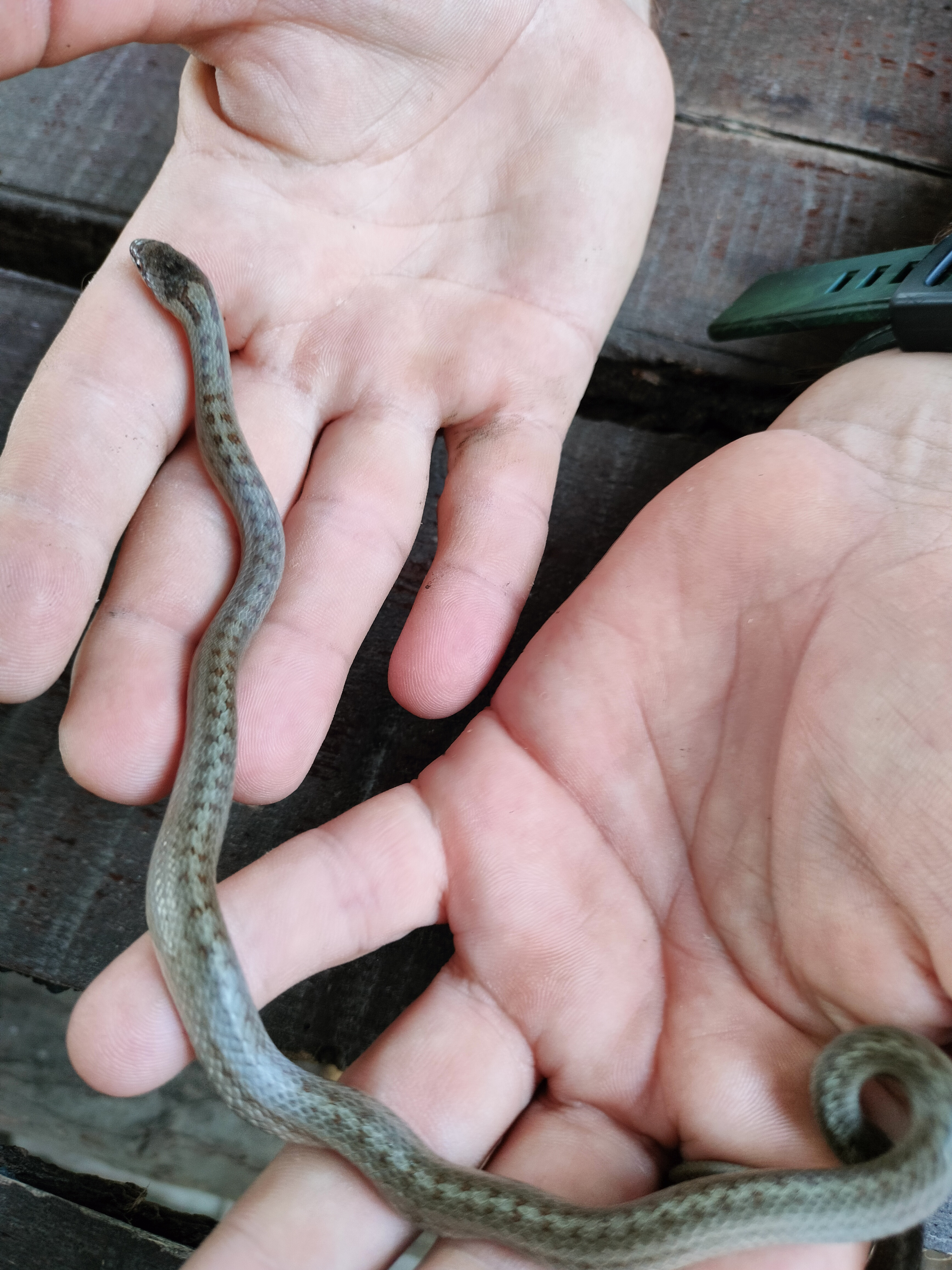

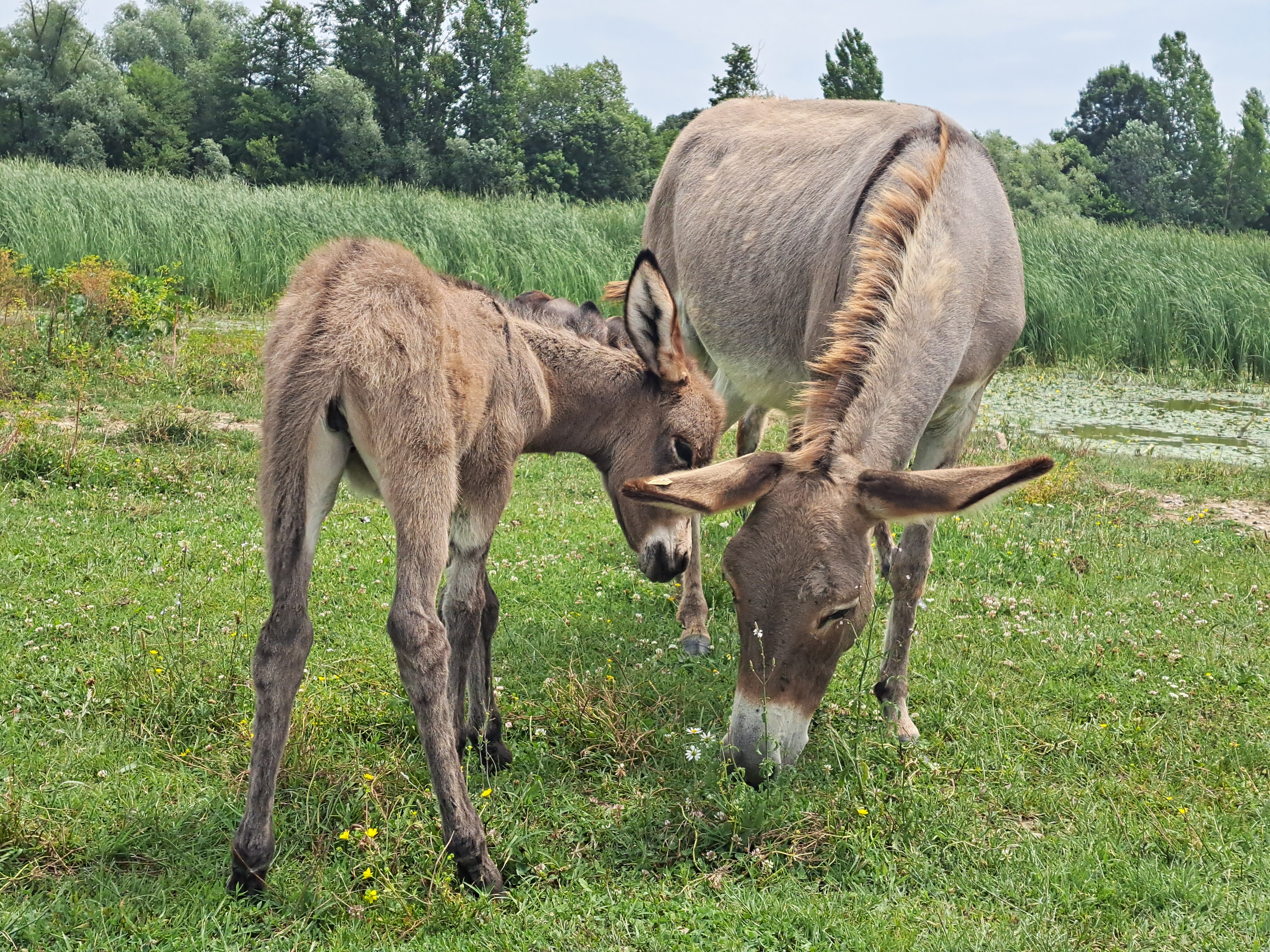

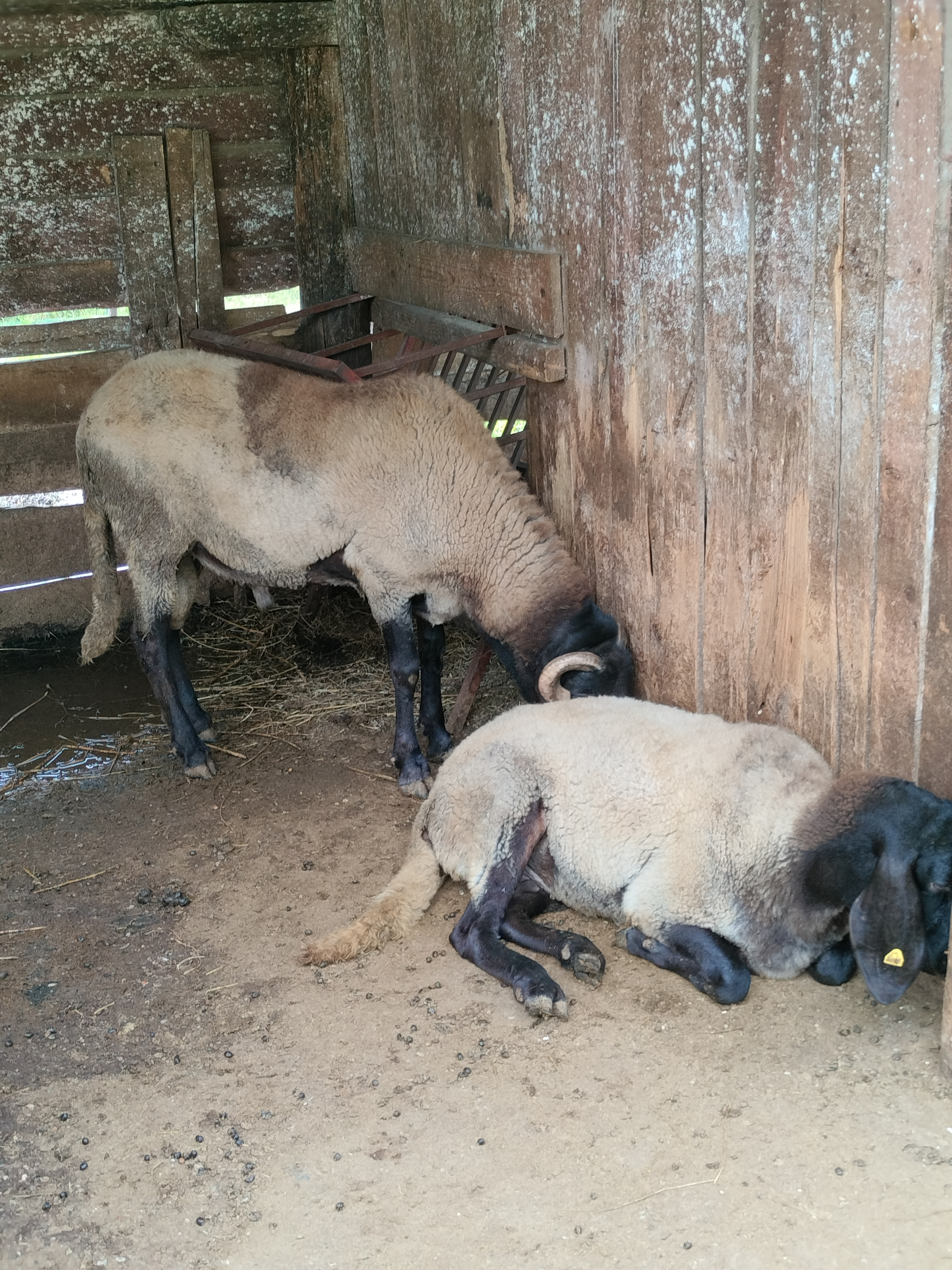

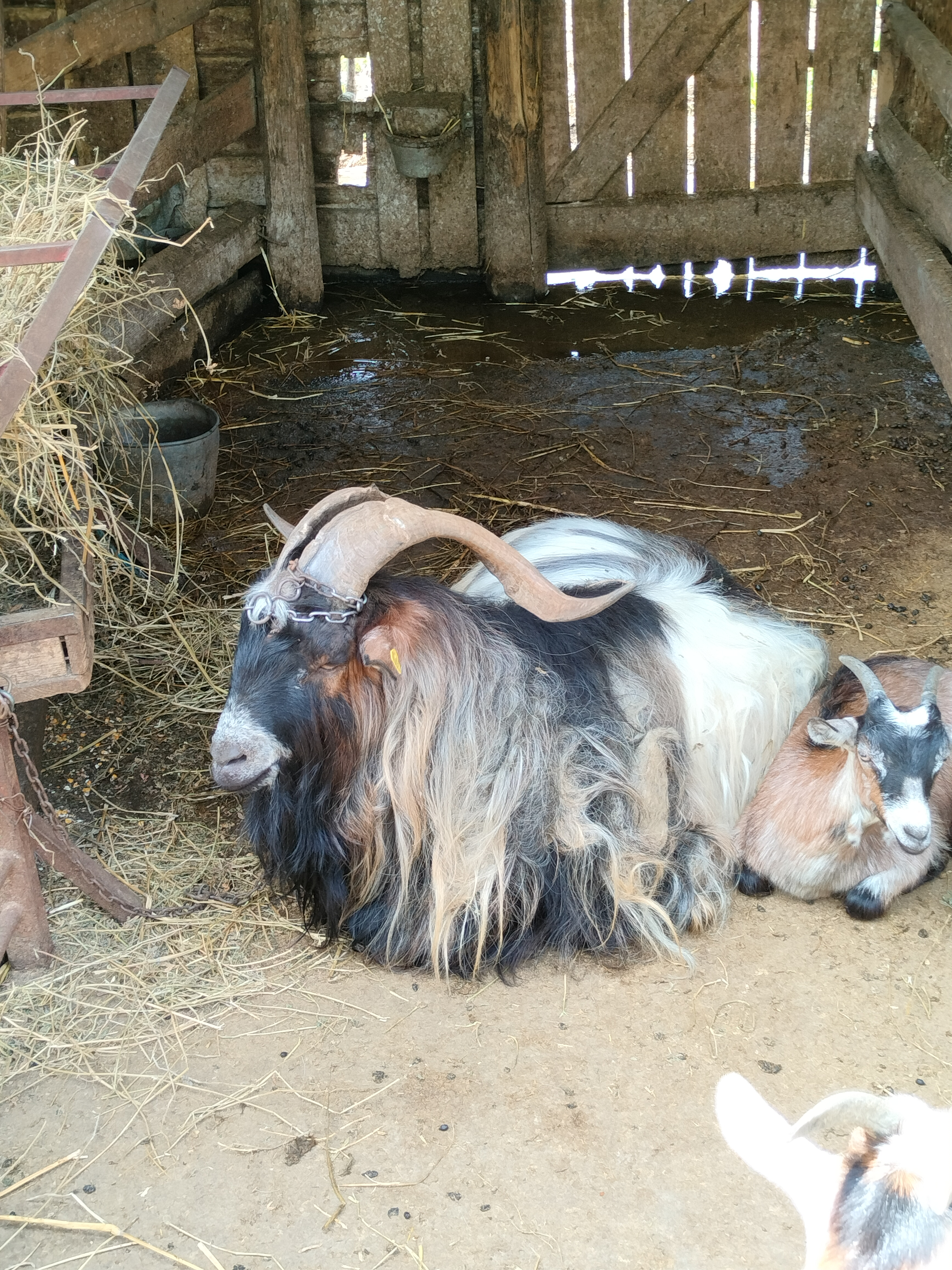

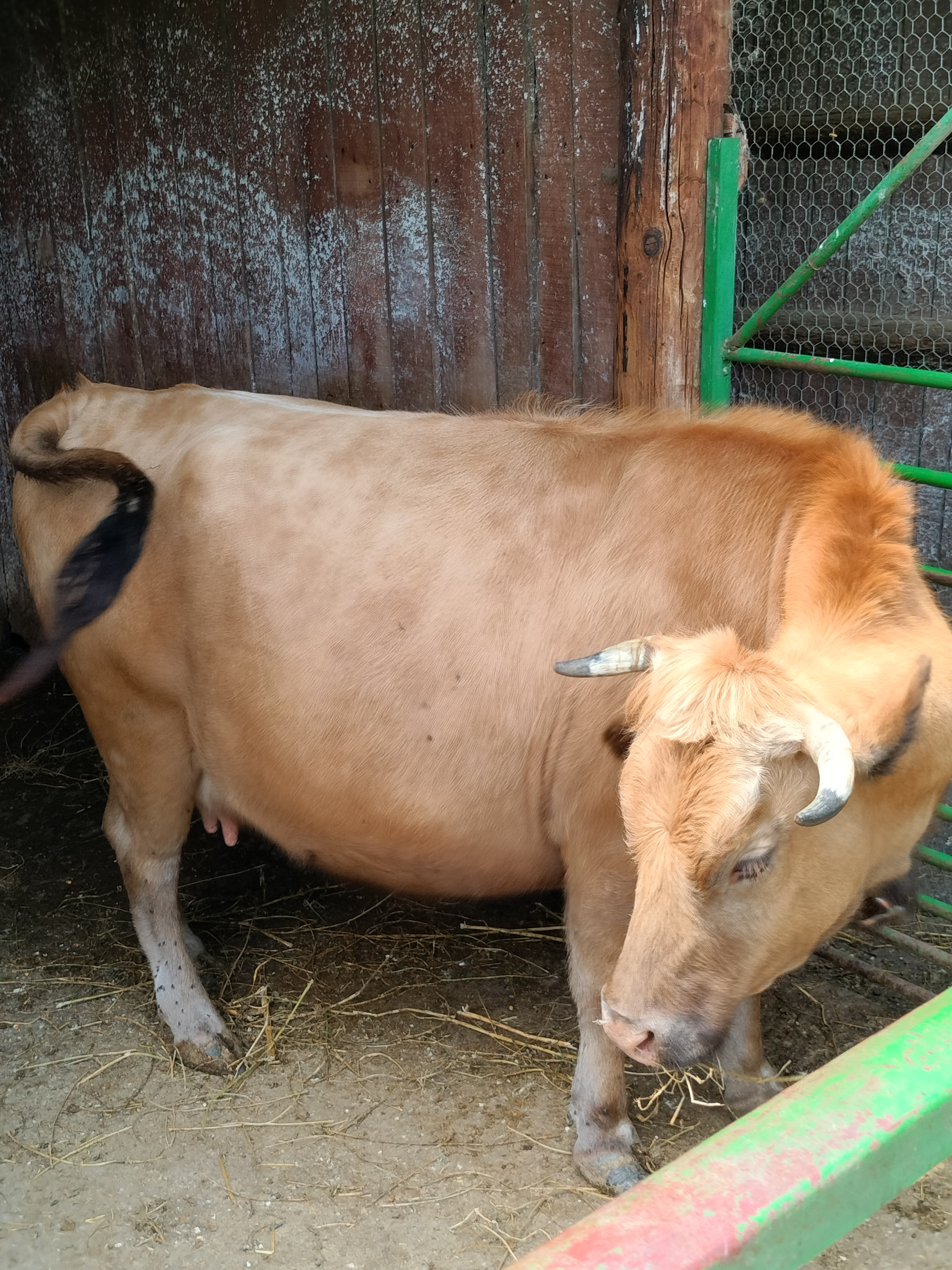

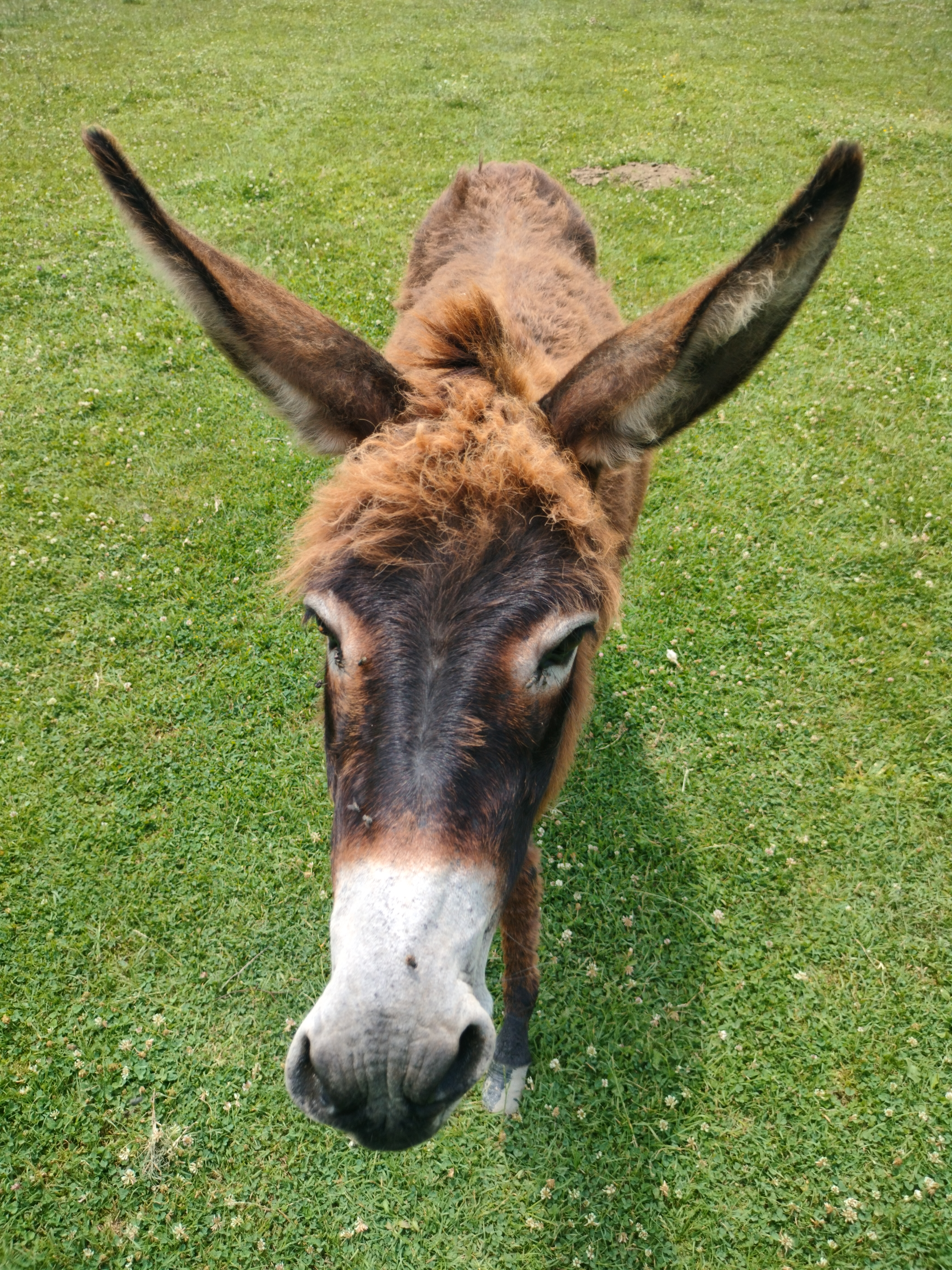

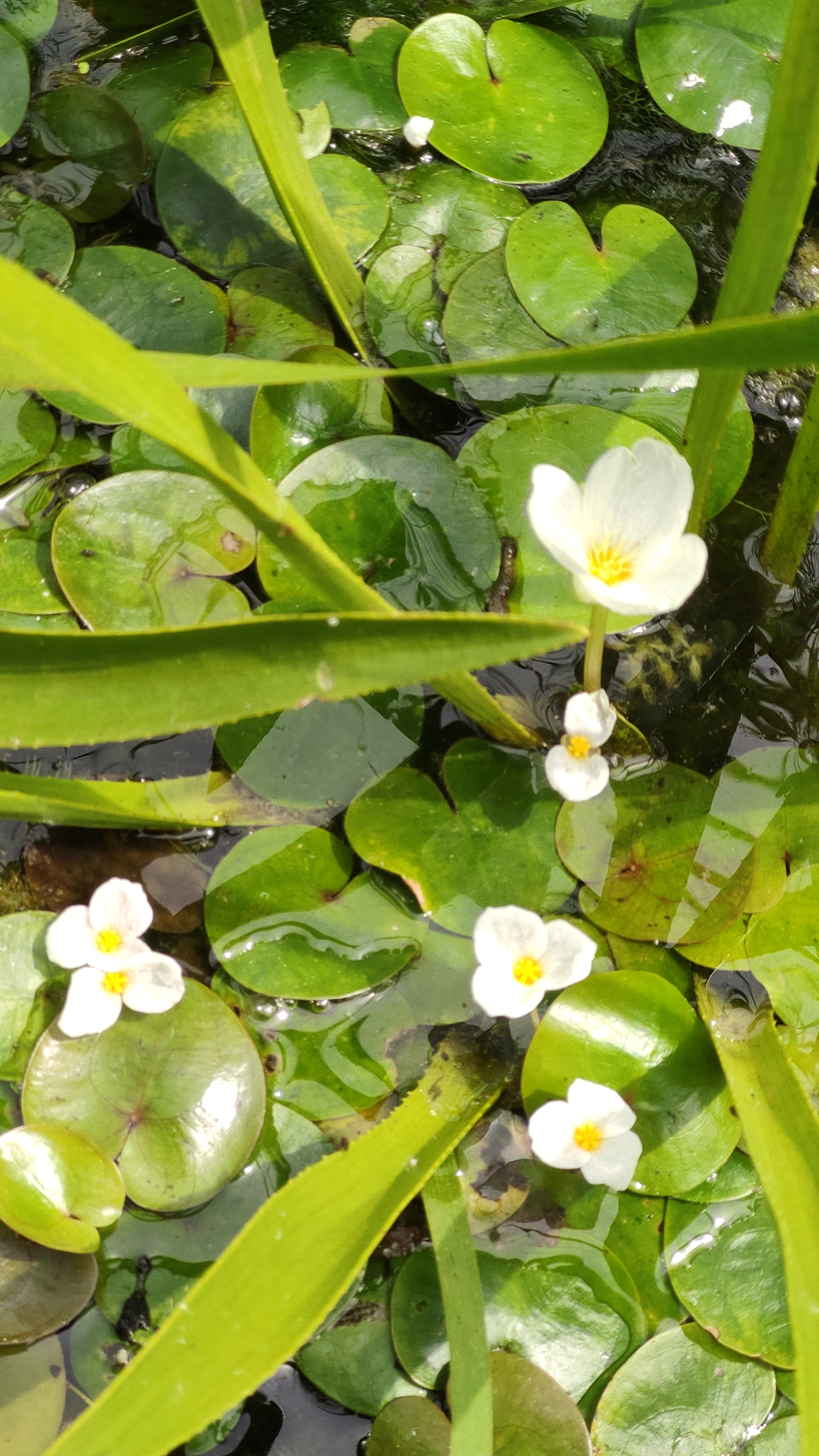

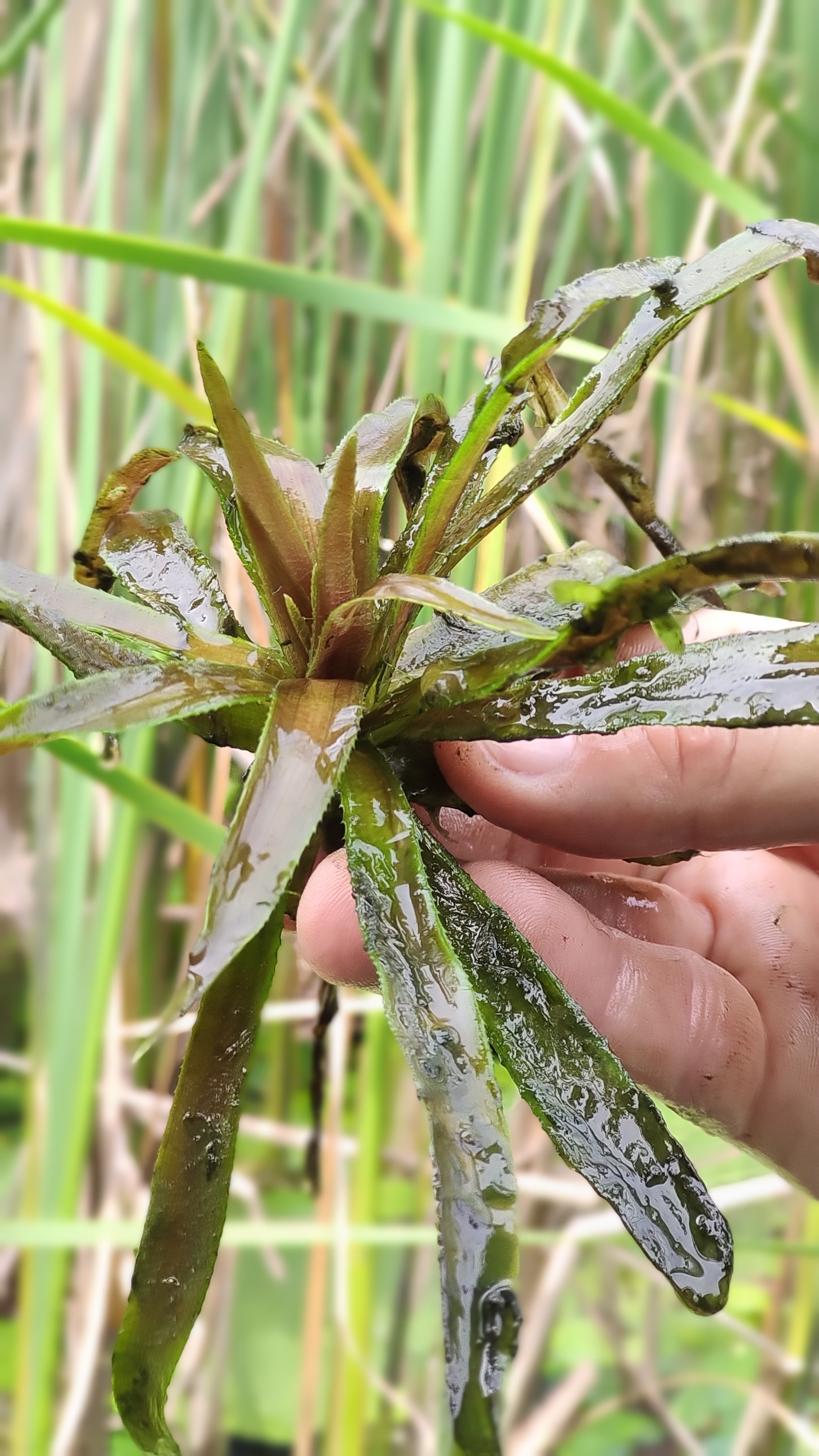

== See also ==
- List of lakes in Serbia
