= Tadija Miletić =

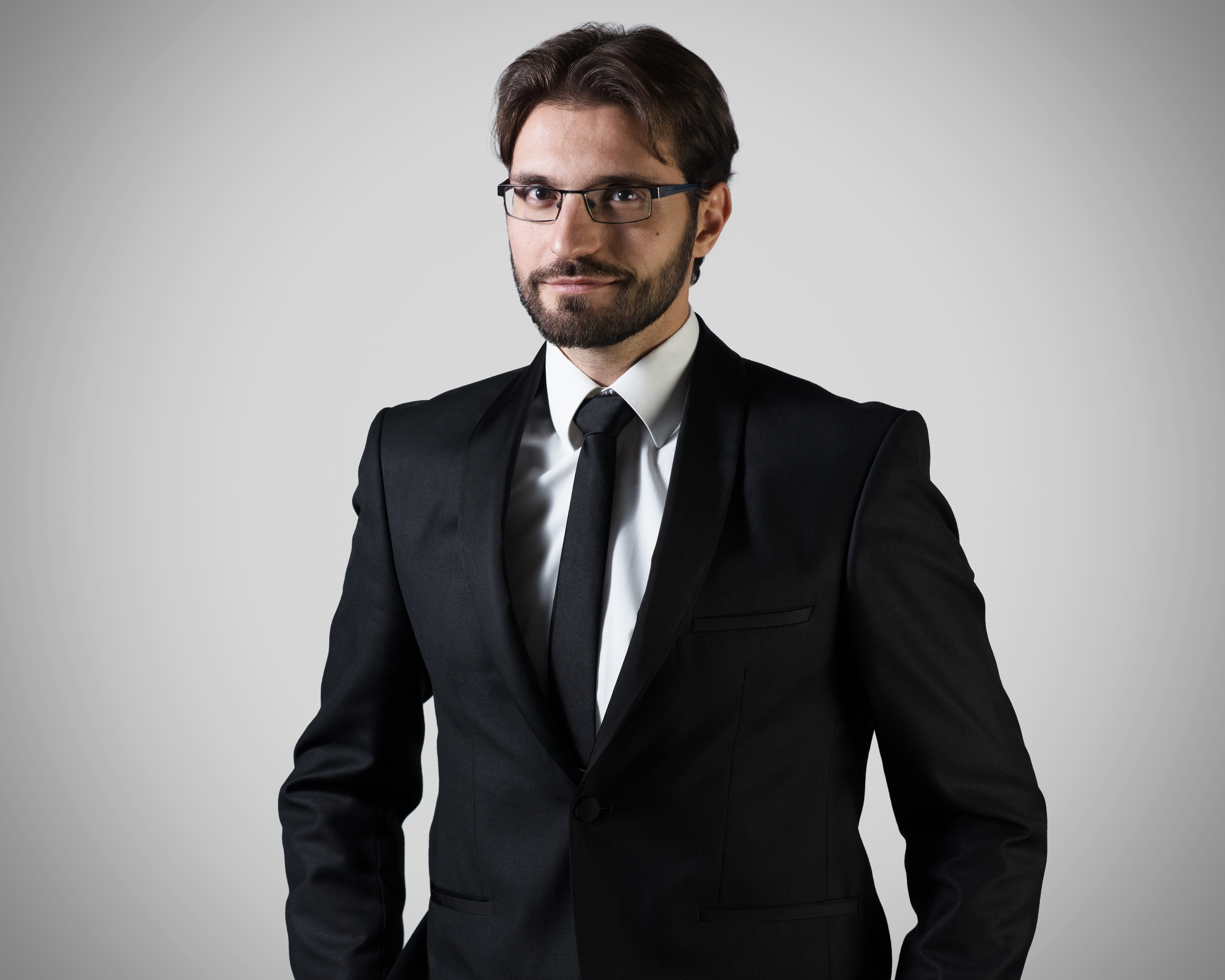
- Born: Tadija Miletić; Belgrade, SFR Yugoslavia
- Occupations: Director; Dramaturge; Motivational speaker; University Professor
- Spouse: Dina Miletić
- Children: 1
- Website: www.tadijamiletic.com

Tadija Miletić (Serbian Cyrillic: Тадија Милетић) is a Serbian stage director, dramaturge, and motivational speaker. He is the founder of the organization Kulturni element, director of the "Lazar Jovanović" International Opera Competition, and the founder of the artistic educational center Kulturni institut. He is an associate professor at the Academy of Arts, Belgrade Dance Institute and the Faculty of Contemporary Arts in Belgrade, where he also served as the head of the drama department. Miletić is noted as having one of the highest measured IQs in Serbia by Mensa Serbia, where he was a long-serving member of the presidency. He has staged over thirty operas, plays, and other projects.

== Early life and education ==
Tadija was born into the well-known Miletić artistic family in Belgrade. Miletić graduated from the Stanković Music School in 2005, having completed three departments simultaneously (piano, music theory, and solo singing) alongside his grammar school education. During high school, he also unofficially attended lectures at the Faculty of Philosophy and the Faculty of Orthodox Theology, as well as at the Faculty of Music. During this period, he also trained professionally in athletics under the famous Yugoslav Olympian Franjo Mihalić.

He graduated in 2011 from the Academy of Arts in Belgrade with a degree in dramaturgy, in the class of Professor Siniša Kovačević. He completed his master's studies in directing at the Academy of Arts in Novi Sad, in the class of Nikita Milivojević. In 2019, he enrolled in doctoral studies in Interdisciplinary Studies at the University of Arts in Belgrade. He is a recipient of a prestigious international scholarship from the Mensa International Foundation, selected as one of only five winners from a competition of 58 countries. He has participated in numerous international conferences, including "The Future of Performing Arts" organized by UNESCO in 2018, and completed masterclasses in Leadership and Time Management.

== Career ==
For the first fifteen years of his career, Miletić worked at the Opera and Theatre Madlenianum as a dramaturge, assistant director, and later as a director. From 2008 to 2014, he worked for the BITEF festival as a troupe leader.

In 2011, with a group of young artists, he founded the organization Kulturni element, which aims to promote culture and cultural awareness. As part of this organization, he authored an exhibition titled "Trag generacija" (Trace of Generations) at the Princess Ljubica's Residence in 2015, in collaboration with the Belgrade City Museum. He underwent professional training at the Opéra de Monte-Carlo in Monaco.

In 2019, he became an assistant professor, and in 2020, the head of the drama department at the Faculty of Contemporary Arts. In 2022, he co-founded the artistic educational center Kulturni institut. Since 2025, he also teaches at the Academy of Arts in Belgrade as an associate professor.

=== Directing ===
Miletić began his professional directing career at the Opera and Theatre Madlenianum as an assistant director for many operas such as Madama Butterfly, Pagliacci, and The Magic Flute, as well as the musicals Les Misérables and Rebecca. His engagement in the musical Les Misérables is particularly noteworthy; he maintained the show's direction for its entire fifteen-year run, from the premiere to the final 100th performance. As he knew the entire score and all the solo and choral roles by heart, he played 22 different roles throughout the multi-year run, including, on three occasions, the principal role of Marius Pontmercy, which was originated at the premiere by known actor Ivan Bosiljčić. His solo directing debut was Donizetti's opera L'elisir d'amore in 2014. That same year, he worked as an assistant director for Martin Lloyd-Evans on the opera Roméo et Juliette through the Operosa foundation.

In the following years, he directed numerous productions, including Joseph Haydn's opera The Apothecary (2015), the musical-stage performance "Quod Fatum" about Pyotr Ilyich Tchaikovsky (2016), and "Amadeus," inspired by the life of Wolfgang Amadeus Mozart.

In 2018, he initiated a series of projects to establish a permanent opera scene in Kragujevac, where he staged the Serbian premieres of Henry Purcell's Dido and Aeneas (2018) and George Frideric Handel's Imeneo (2019) at the Knjaževsko-srpski teatar. In 2023, he directed Madama Butterfly at the National Theatre in Sarajevo. In 2024, he directed the concert-performance "Letters of the Executed" at the "Ivo Andrić" Serbian Cultural Center in Beijing.

=== Dramaturgy and writing ===
Miletić has worked as a dramaturge on several operas at the Madlenianum, including The Magic Flute and L'elisir d'amore, which he also translated. In 2017, he wrote the television series "Prva tarifa", which was the first Serbian web sitcom, premiered on Prva TV. From 2014 to 2022, he was the editor-in-chief of the magazine MozaIQ, the official publication of Mensa Serbia. He is also the editor-in-chief of the Novi Tvrđava Teatar festival and an editor for the Festival of Monodrama and Pantomime.

=== Lectures and public speaking ===
Miletić is also active as a lecturer and motivational speaker. In 2013, he held a lecture at the Academy of Arts in Belgrade on the topic "Dramaturgy of Opera and Musical Theatre". Since 2016, he has held a series of lectures titled "Writing, Idea, and Inspiration" at universities across Serbia. In 2024, he launched a motivational speaking tour across Serbia titled "The Art of Success", with lectures such as "Method and Principle of Success" and "Public Speaking".

== Personal life ==
Miletić was born into the well-known Miletić artistic family. He is the son of the actor Predrag Miletić and the brother of producer Vuk Miletić. He is married to Dina Miletić, a pianist, with whom he has a son.
