= Historic ships network =

International network devoted to ocean liner history

Historic Ships Network
- Abbreviation: HSN
- Formation: 2007; 19 years ago
- Founder: Tadija Miletić
- Type: International network
- Purpose: Preservation of ocean liner and maritime history
- Headquarters: Belgrade, Serbia
- Region served: Worldwide
- Members: 90+ (2026)
- President: Tadija Miletić
- Parent organization: Kulturni element
- Website: historicshipsnetwork.com
- Formerly called: Olympic Class System (2011–2021)

The Historic Ships Network (HSN) is an international network of social media communities, organizations and individuals devoted to the history of ocean liners, transatlantic voyages, shipping companies and their passengers. It was founded in Belgrade in 2007 by the Serbian stage director and dramaturge Tadija Miletić, who serves as its president. Originally a group of pages about famous ocean liners, it was branded the Olympic Class System in 2011 and reorganized under its current name in 2021. According to the network, it has more than 90 members in over 40 countries. It is a project of the Belgrade arts organization Kulturni element.

== History ==
=== Origins (2007–2020) ===
In 2007, while studying dramaturgy at the Academy of Arts in Belgrade, Miletić created a set of nearly 20 pages dedicated to well-known transatlantic liners. In April of that year he published a minute-by-minute timeline of the sinking of the Titanic, posted in real time on the anniversary; this became the network's annual Titanic Memorial Month.

In 2009 Cristian Cararra of Bergamo, Italy, joined the network, bringing with him an online community dedicated to RMS Titanic; with administrators and moderators from several countries, this marked the network's first international expansion. In 2011 it received its first visual identity under the name Olympic Class System, after the White Star Line's Olympic-class liners, although by then it already covered dozens of other ships.

From 2015 Miletić approached maritime historians, museum curators, university researchers and heritage institutions, many of whom began contributing research findings, rare photographs and archival material to the network's pages. A second annual commemoration, Lusitania Memorial Week, marking the sinking of RMS Lusitania on 7 May 1915, has been held each May since 2016. According to the network, its pages first reached audiences of several million during anniversary periods in 2017.

=== Historic Ships Network (2021–present) ===
In April 2021 the network was reorganized and renamed the Historic Ships Network, with the stated aim of becoming a formal international alliance of organizations, institutions and individuals beyond social media. The network states that its combined reach during the 2024 Titanic and Lusitania commemorations exceeded 13 million people.

In April 2026, timed to the anniversary of the sinking of the Titanic, HSN launched its official website, which includes a registry of historic ships, a member directory and an online store. On that occasion the Serbian portal Blic Žena profiled Miletić as head of what it described as the world's largest network for historic ships, with 13 million followers.

== Activities ==
The network describes its core aims as preservation (digitizing rare blueprints, photographs, passenger records and first-hand accounts), research, building a community of historians and enthusiasts, and education.

=== Ship registry ===
The registry on the network's website lists 266 vessels, from SS Savannah (1819) to RMS Queen Mary 2 (2004), with photographs, specifications and a history of each ship.

=== Commemorations ===
- Titanic Memorial Month – held from 1 to 30 April every year since 2007. It consists of hundreds of posts, each published at the exact time of the corresponding event of the night of 14–15 April 1912, simultaneously on seven platforms: Facebook, Instagram, X, YouTube, TikTok, Patreon and Reddit.
- Lusitania Memorial Week – held every May since 2016 on the anniversary of the sinking of the Lusitania.
- The network also marks the anniversaries of the sinkings of Britannic (November 1916) and Andrea Doria (July 1956), among other dates in maritime history.

=== Membership and store ===
According to Blic Žena, the network's members include Titanic Belfast, the Titanic International Society, the National Maritime Museum in London, the Maritime Museum Rotterdam, the Mystic Seaport Museum, the British Titanic Society and Encyclopedia Titanica, as well as individual authors, artists and researchers of ocean liner history.

Through Patreon the network runs a membership club, the Historic Ships Club, whose benefits include early access to new releases, monthly packages of printed material, store discounts and access to unpublished deck plans and technical drawings. An online store, opened in 2026, sells apparel, posters, home decor and commemorative items.

== Leadership ==
According to the network's website, its leadership consists of:

- Tadija Miletić (Belgrade) – founder and president
- Cristian Cararra (Bergamo, Italy) – key partner for Europe
- Jordan Scalph (Virginia, United States) – key partner for the Americas
- Nikola Trišić (Belgrade) – network associate, responsible for the store and membership
