= Siniša Kovačević =

Serbian writer

- Синиша Ковачевић
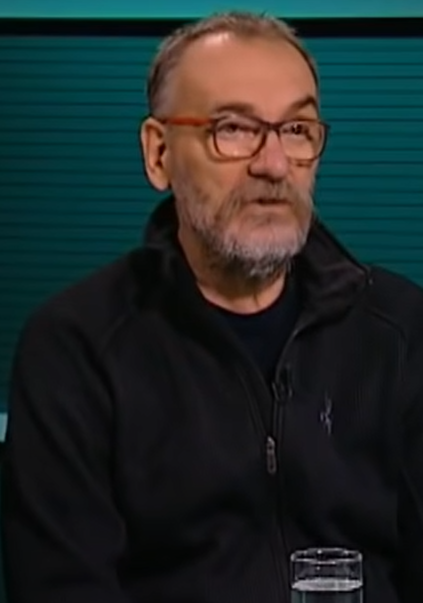
- Kovačević in 2019
- Born: Синиша Ковачевић; 30 May 1954 (age 71); Šuljam near Sremska Mitrovica, PR Serbia, FPR Yugoslavia
- Citizenship: Serb
- Education: Faculty of Dramatic Arts
- Alma mater: University of Arts in Belgrade
- Occupations: Film director, screenwriter
- Political party: People's Party
- Spouse: Ljiljana Blagojević
- Children: Kalina Kovačević

Siniša Kovačević (Serbian Cyrillic: Синиша Ковачевић, pronounced [sǐniʃa koʋǎːtʃeʋitɕ]; born 30 May 1954) is a Serbian author, playwright, politician and professor of the Belgrade Academy of Arts.

== Biography ==
Kovačević was born on 30 May 1954 in the northern Serbian village of Šuljam. He graduated in dramaturgy at the Faculty of Dramatic Arts in Belgrade. He is a professor at Academy of Arts in the case dramaturgy. He writes for theatre, film, and TV. His works have been translated into Russian, Macedonian, English, and German language. He is married to actress Ljiljana Blagojević, with whom he has a daughter, Kalina Kovačević, also an actress. He lives and works in Belgrade.

== Works ==
=== Stage dramas ===
- Đeneral Milan Nedić
- Novo je doba
- Sveti Sava
- Poslednja ruka pred fajront
- Srpska drama
- Virus
- Velika drama
- Kraljević Marko
- Janez
- Ravi
- Zečiji nasip
- Čudesni

=== TV dramas ===
- Portret Ilije Pevca
- Mala šala
- Svečana obaveza

=== Film scripts ===
- Država Mrtvih
- Bolje od bekstva
- Najbolji
- Najviše na svetu celom

=== Directed Premieres of his dramas ===
- Virus
- Kraljević Marko
- Janez
- Velika drama
- Zečiji nasip

Plus the movie Sinovci in 2006, and the TV series Gorki Plodovi in 2008/09.

== Awards ==
- Triple Sterija Award winner for theatrical plays: Novo je doba, Đeneral Milan Nedić, Janez.
- Triple "Branislav Nušić" Award winner for theatrical plays: Sveti Sava, Kraljević Marko,Ravi.
- TV drama Novo je doba included in the top ten TV dramas, as the third.
- TV drama Svečana obaveza classified in the five best TV dramas ever recorded.
- TV drama Mala šala joke is included in četrvrtu book anthology of contemporary TV dramas.
