= Mozaiq =

Mozaiq may refer to:

- MozaIQ (magazine), Serbian magazine published by Serbian Mensa
- Mozaiq (album), the fourth studio album by the metal band, Blood Stain Child
