= Sremska Mitrovica =

City in the province of Vojvodina, Serbia

Sremska Mitrovica Сремска Митровица (Serbian)
- City
- City of Sremska Mitrovica
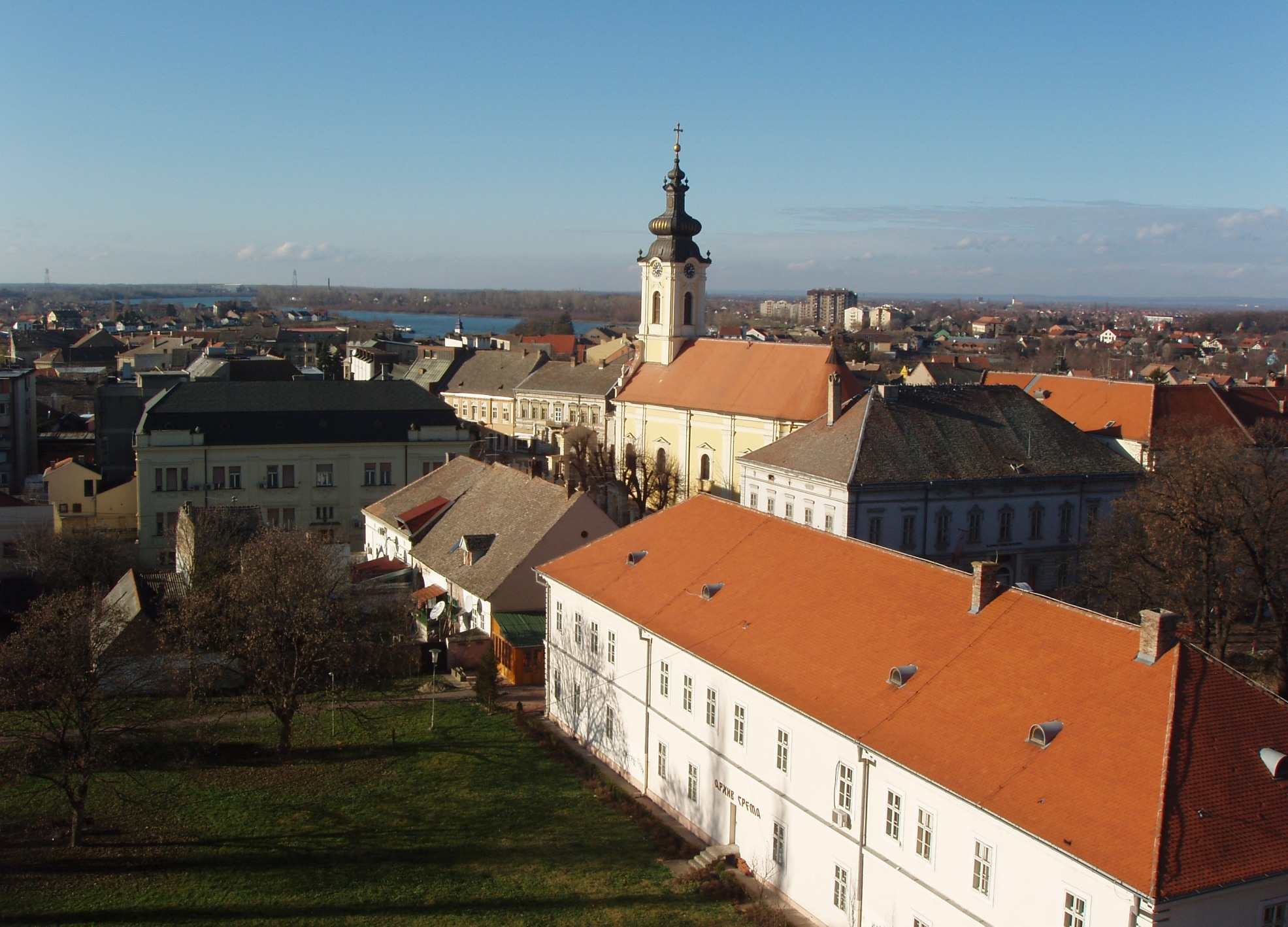
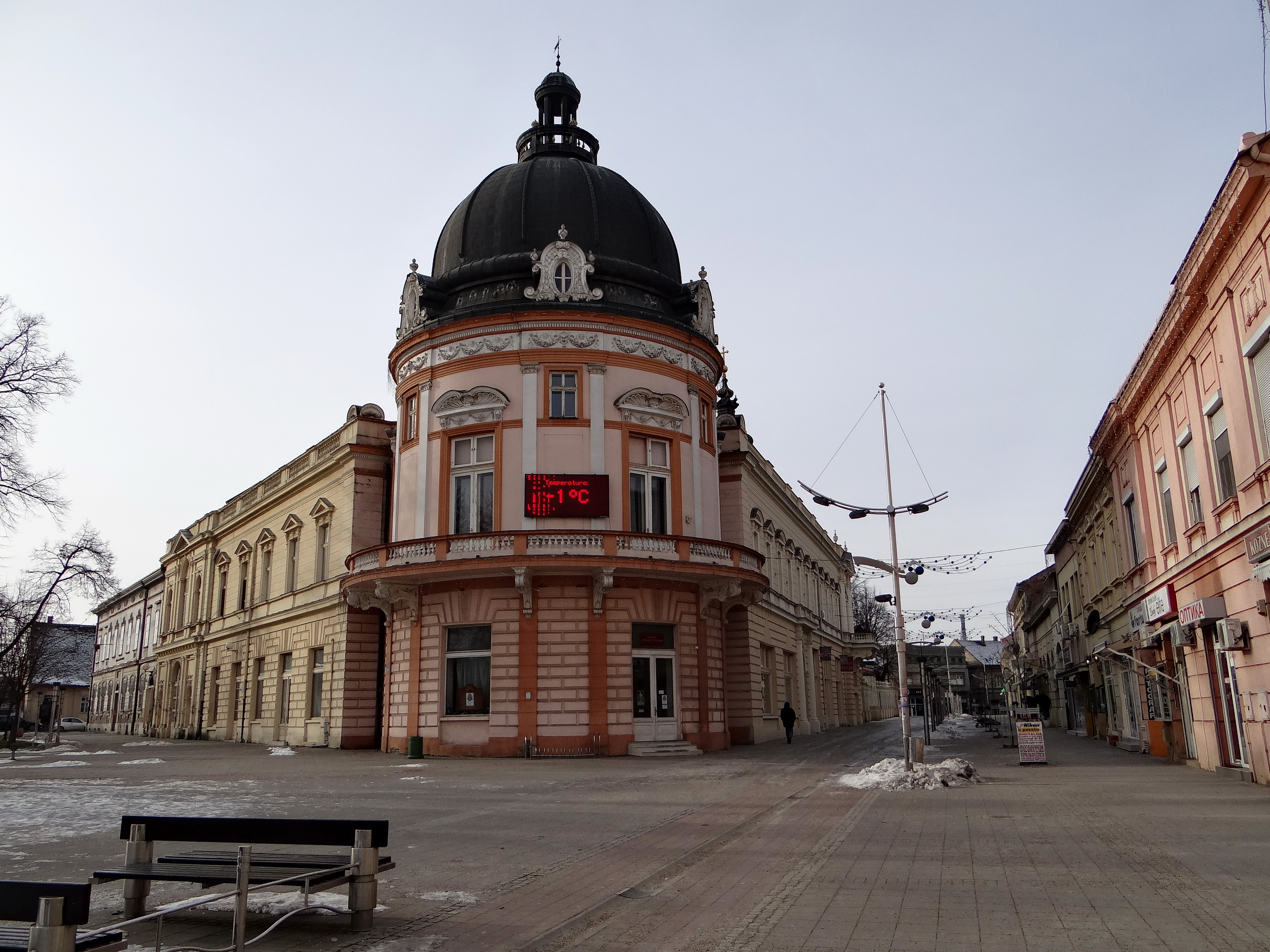
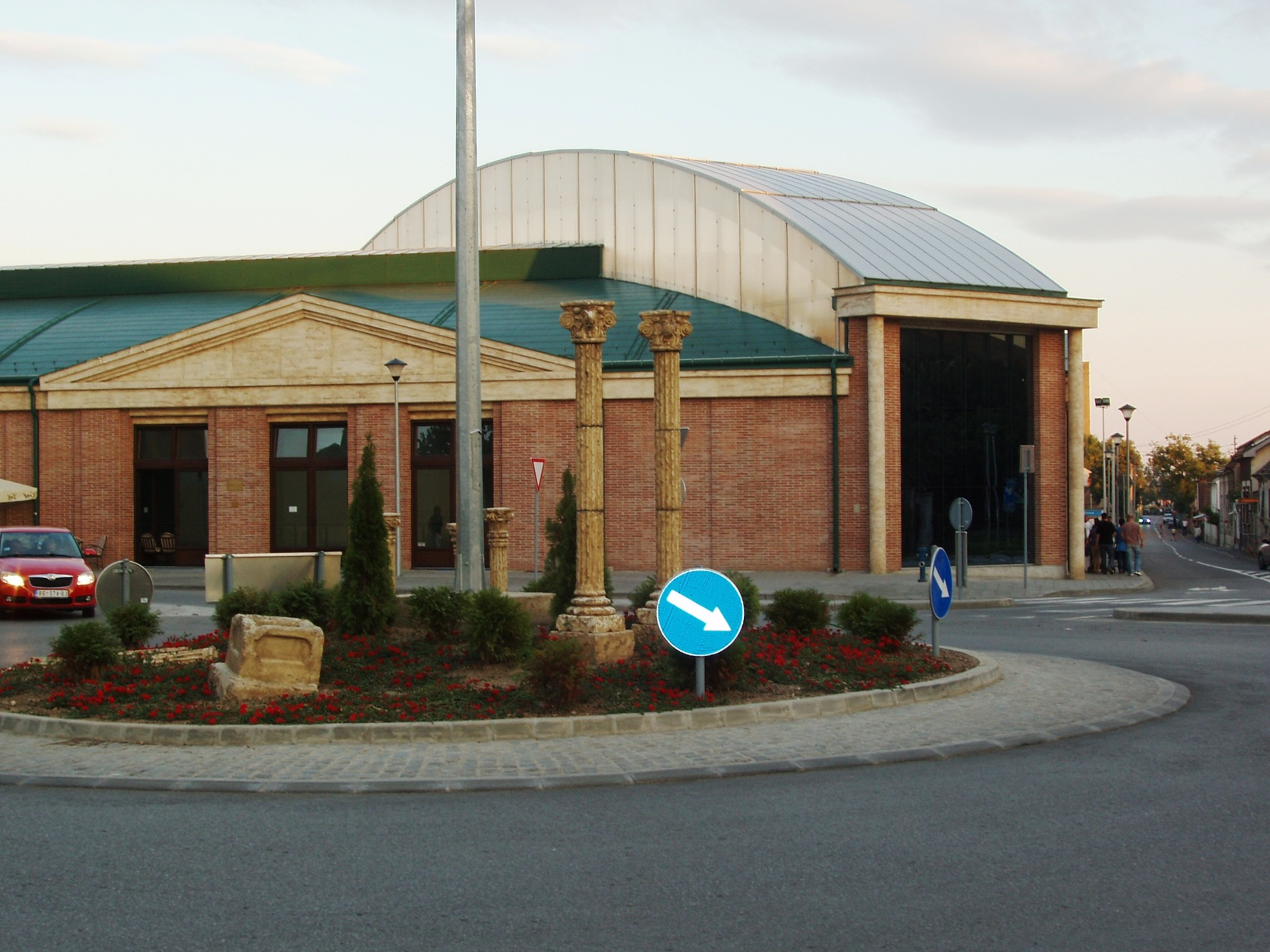
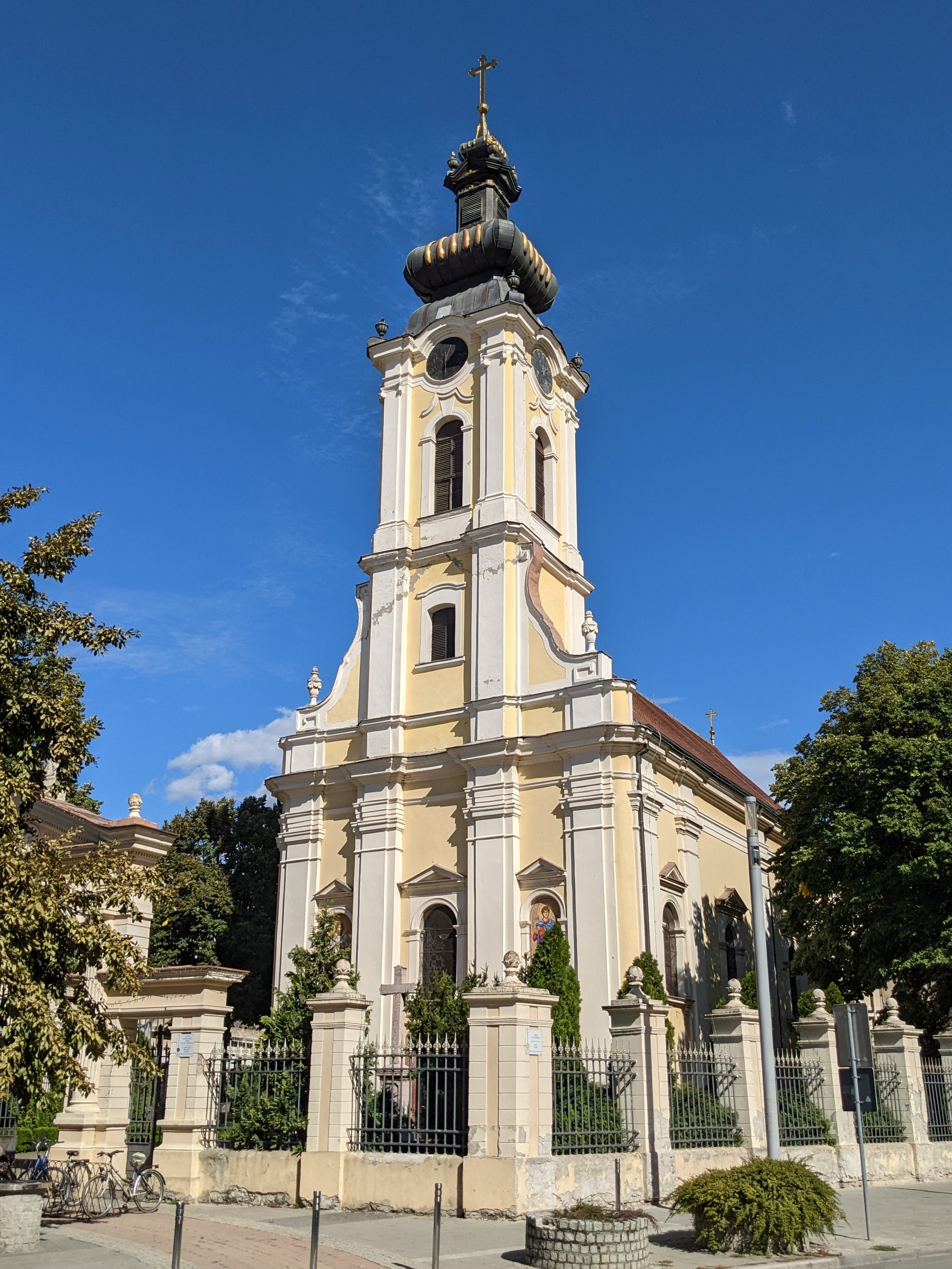
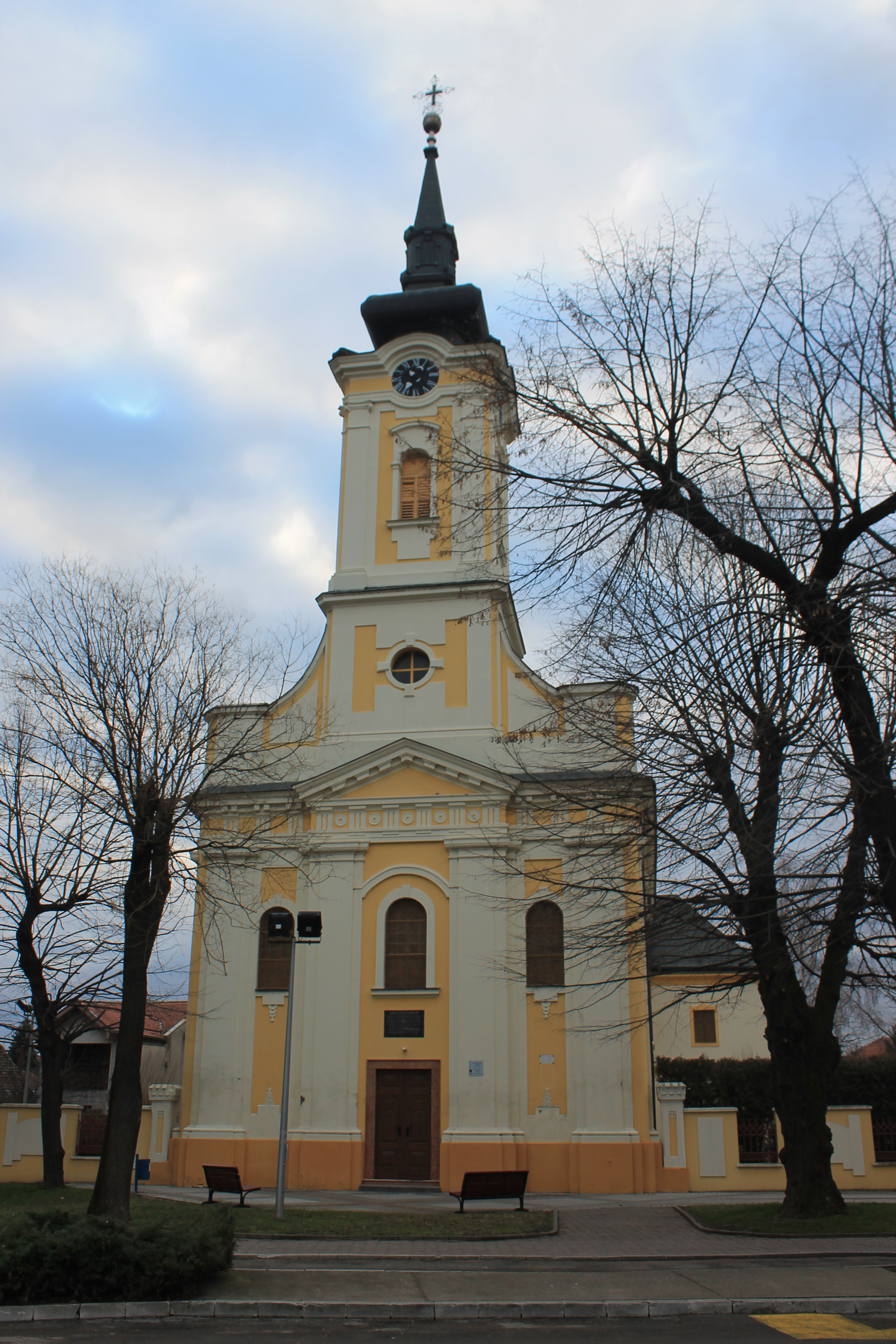
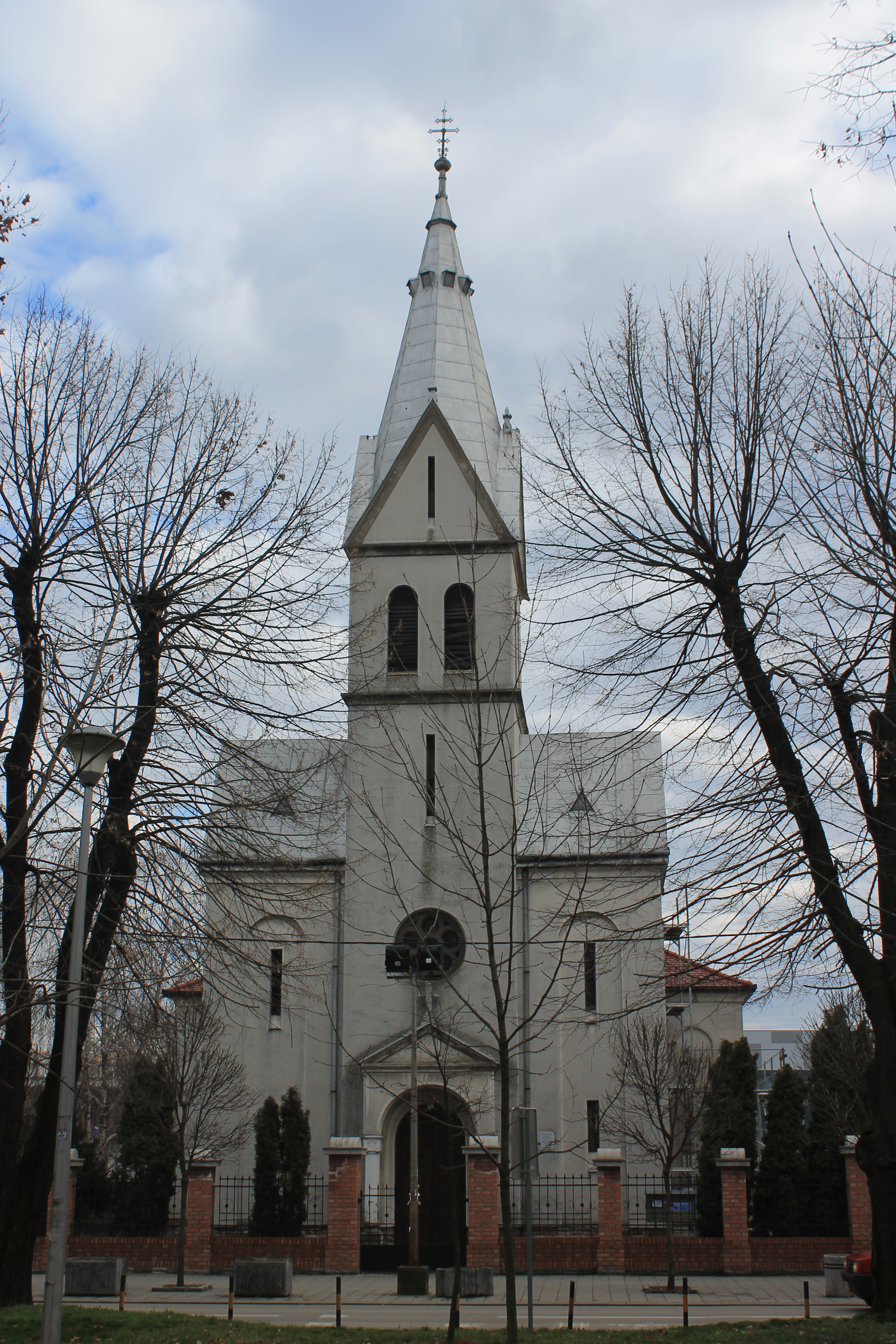
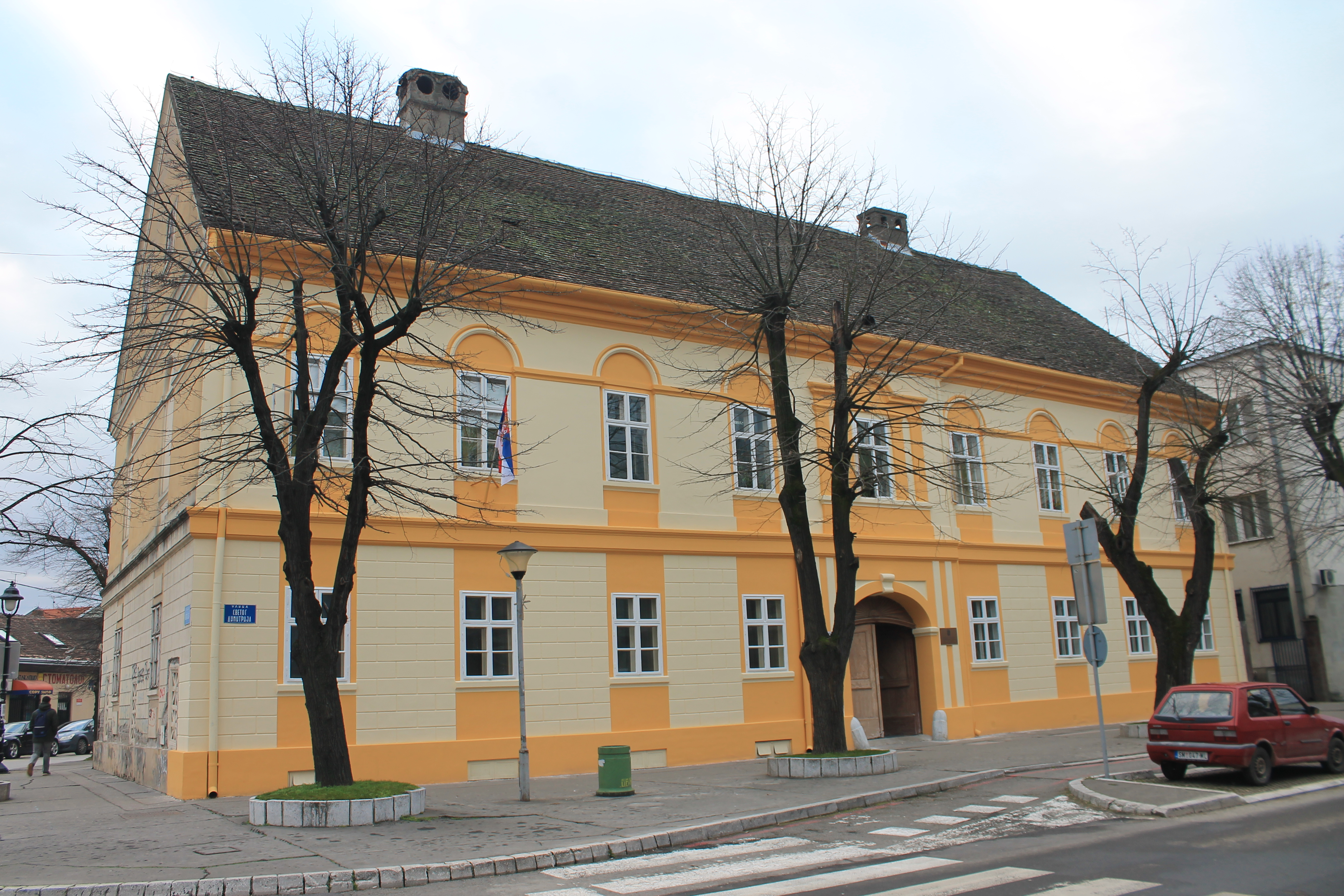
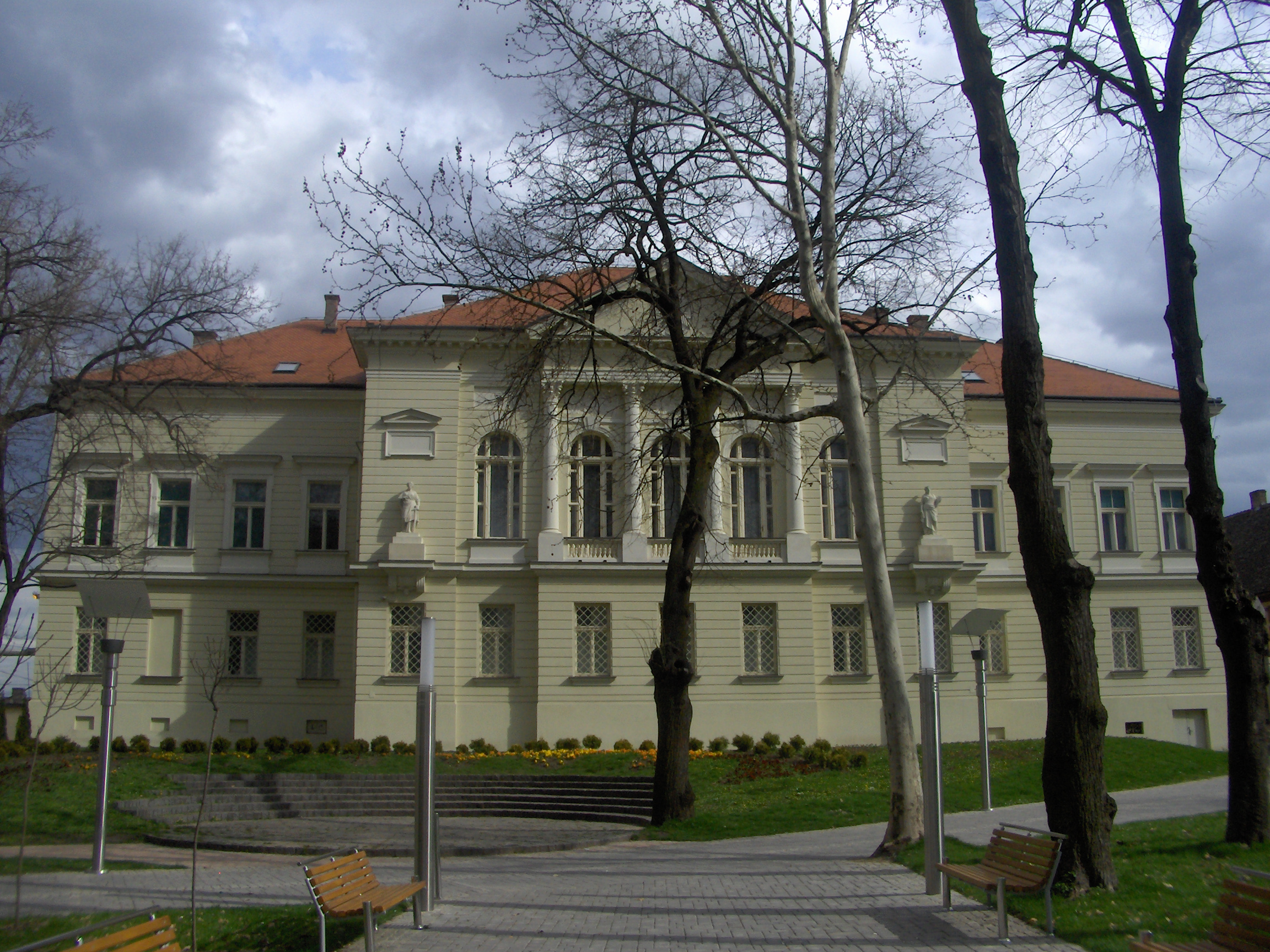
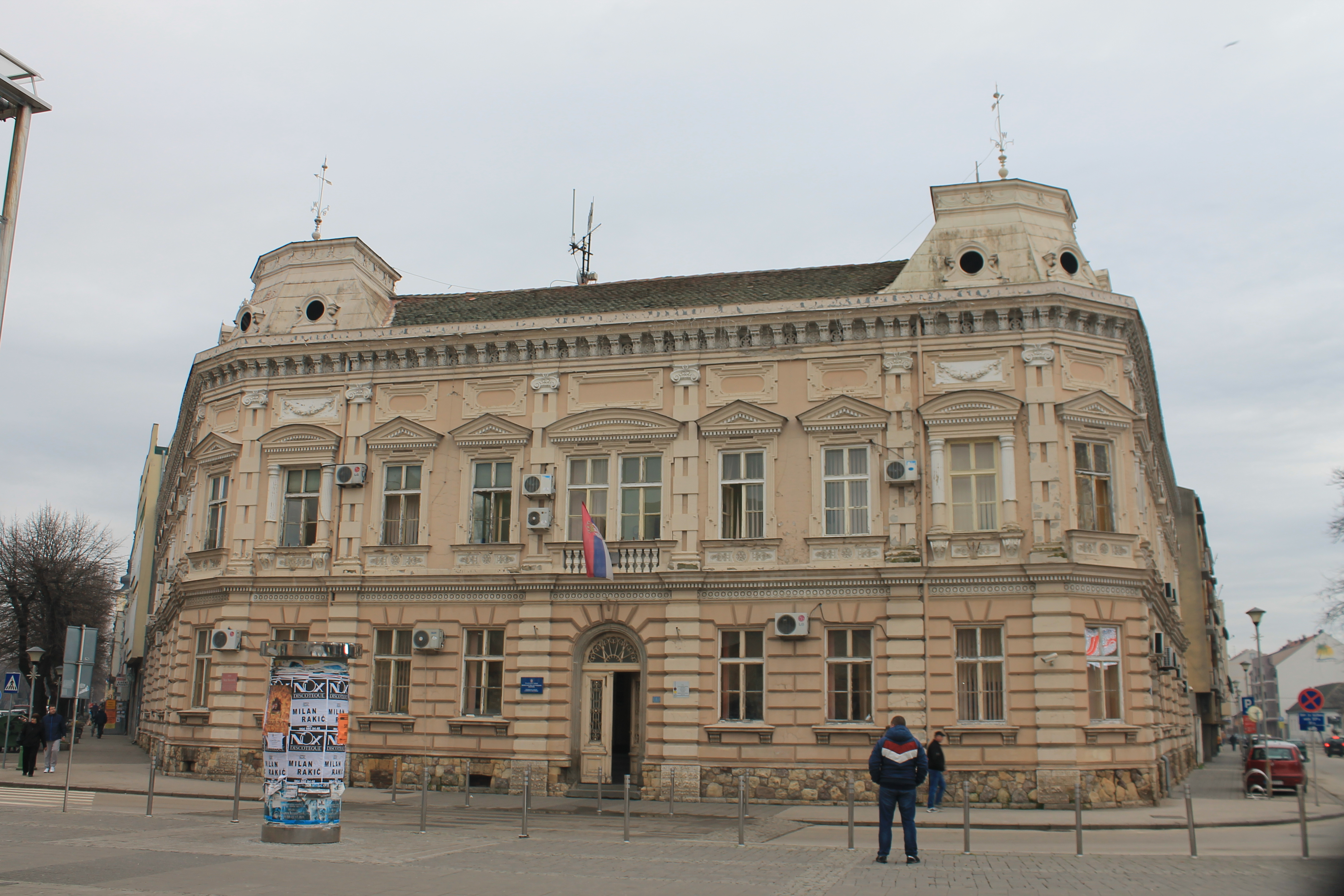
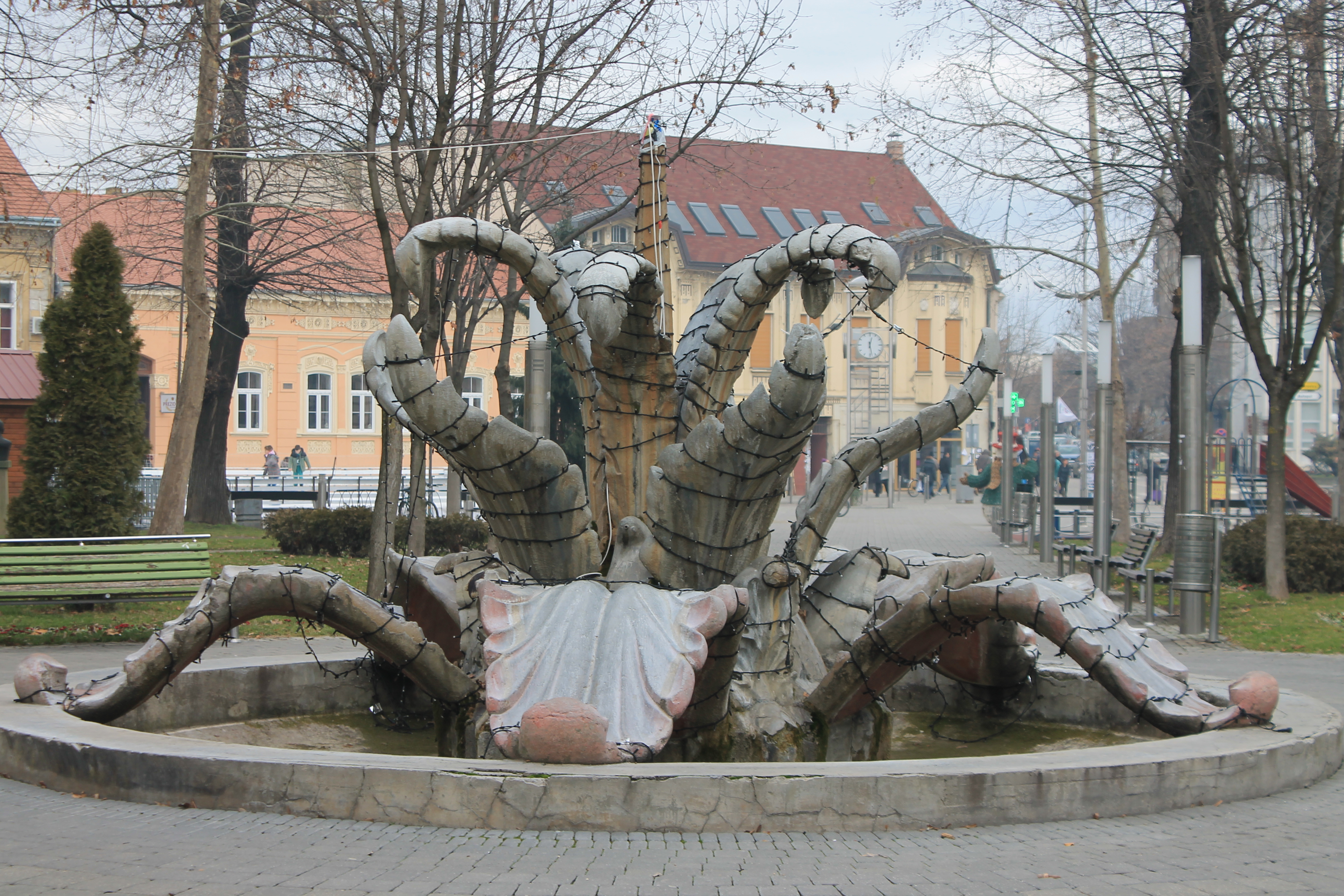
- Panorama of Sremska Mitrovica Sremska Mitrovica City Library Imperial Palace in Sirmium Church of St. Demetrius Cathedral of St. Demetrius Church of the Ascension of the Lord Military- border building Sremska Mitrovica City Gallery Sremska Mitrovica Police Station The "Stone flower" fountain

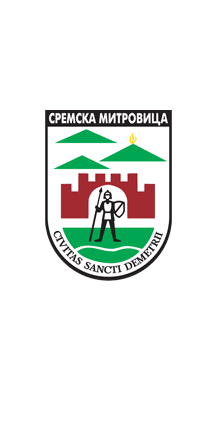
- Flag Coat of arms

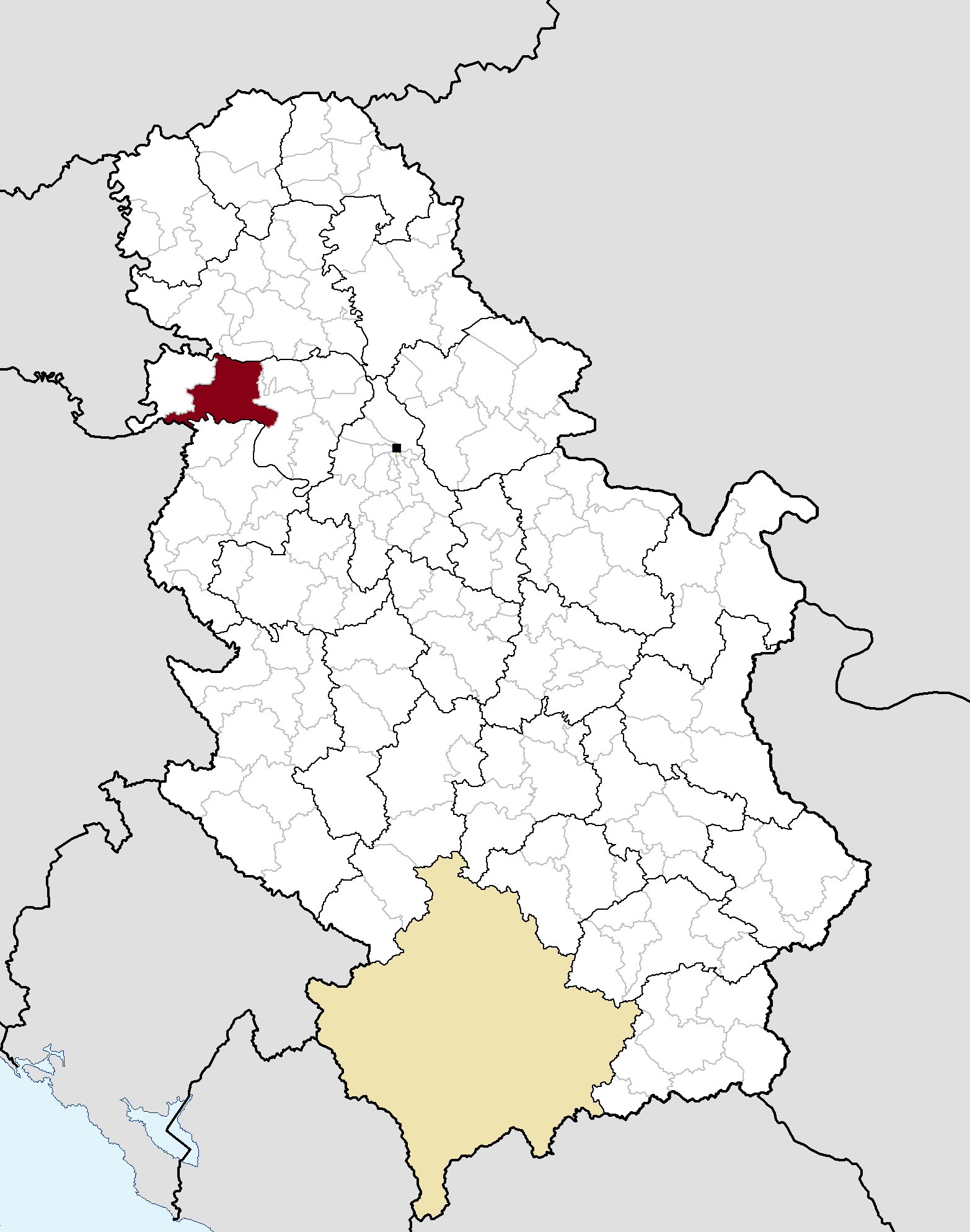
- Location of the administrative area of Sremska Mitrovica within Serbia
- Coordinates: 44°58′12″N 19°36′45″E
- Country: Serbia
- Province: Vojvodina
- Region: Syrmia
- District: Srem
- Municipality: Sremska Mitrovica
- Settlements: 26

Government
  - Mayor: Branislav Nedimović (SNS)

Area
  - Urban: 49.62 km^{2} (19.16 sq mi)
  - Administrative: 762 km^{2} (294 sq mi)
- Elevation: 82 m (269 ft)

Population (2022 census)
  - Rank: 17th in Serbia
  - Urban: 36,764
  - Urban density: 740.9/km^{2} (1,919/sq mi)
  - Administrative: 72,580
  - Administrative density: 95.2/km^{2} (247/sq mi)
- Time zone: UTC+1 (CET)
  - Summer (DST): UTC+2 (CEST)
- Postal code: 22 000
- Area code: +381(0)22
- Car plates: SM
- Official languages: Serbian with parallel usage of Croatian in the village of Stara Bingula
- Website: www.sremskamitrovica.rs

Sremska Mitrovica (Serbian pronunciation: [srêːmskaː mîtroʋitsa]; Serbian Cyrillic: Сремска Митровица, Hungarian: Szávaszentdemeter, Latin: Sirmium) is a city in Serbia. It is situated on the left bank of the Sava river. As of 2022, the city has a total population of 36,764 inhabitants, while its administrative area has a population of 72,580 inhabitants.

As Sirmium, it was a capital of the Roman Empire during the Tetrarchy of 4th century CE. Ten Roman emperors were born in or near this city, Emperors Herennius Etruscus (251), Hostilian (251), Decius Traian (249–251), Claudius Gothicus (268–270), Quintillus (270), Aurelian (270–275), Probus (276–282), Maximian (285–310), Constantius II (337–361) and Gratian (367–383).

== Name ==
The modern town name is Sremska Mitrovica (Serbian: Сремска Митровица). The Hungarian name was Szávaszentdemeter while in Croatian it is referred to as Srijemska Mitrovica. In Pannonian Rusyn, it is referred to as Сримска Митровица.

Mitrovica stems from Saint Demetrius or "Sveti Dimitrije" in Serbian. Sremska Mitrovica means Mitrovica of Syrmia with Sremska distinguishing it from Kosovska Mitrovica.

The name of the city during the reign of the Roman Empire was Sirmium. Beginning in 1180 AD the name changed from "Civitas Sancti Demetrii" to "Dmitrovica", "Mitrovica", and finally to the present form - "Sremska Mitrovica".

== History ==
=== Ancient Sirmium ===
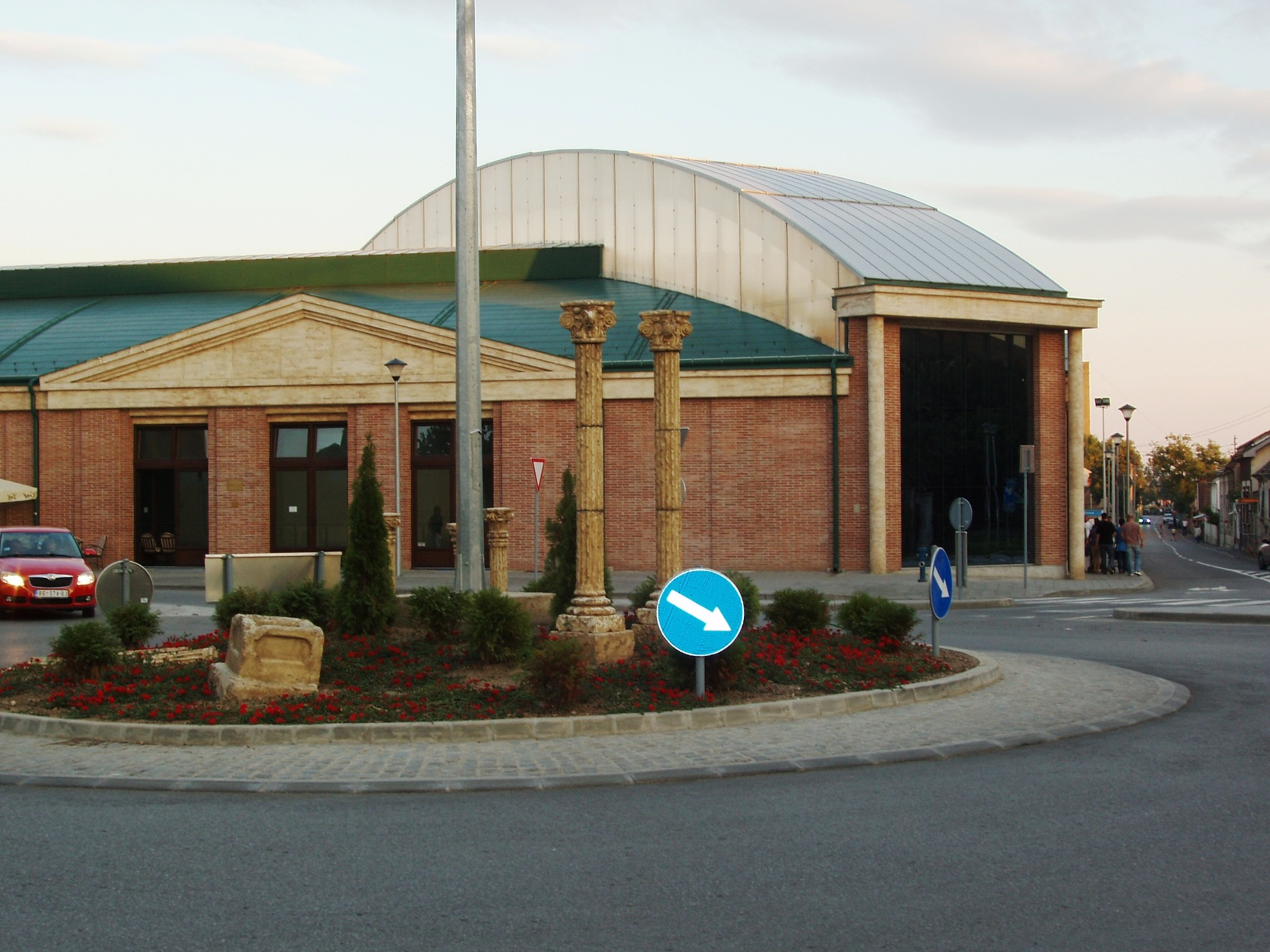
Visitors’ Center of the Roman Imperial Palace

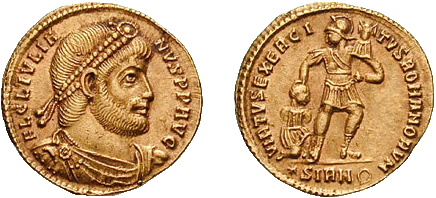
Coins of Julian, Syrmium, 361

Sremska Mitrovica is one of the oldest cities in Europe. Archaeologists have found a trace of organized human life dating from 5000 BC onwards. Ionian jewellery dating to 500BC was excavated in the city. When the Romans conquered the city in the 1st century BC, Sirmium already was a settlement with a long tradition. In the 1st century, Sirmium gained a status of a colony of the citizens of Rome, and became a very important military and strategic location in Pannonia province. The war expeditions of Roman emperors Trajan, Marcus Aurelius, and Claudius II, were prepared in Sirmium.

In 103, Pannonia was split into two provinces: Pannonia Superior and Pannonia Inferior, and Sirmium became the capital city of the latter. In 296, Diocletian implemented a new territorial division of Pannonia. Instead of previous two provinces, there were four new provinces established in former territory of original Pannonia: Pannonia Prima, Pannonia Valeria, Pannonia Savia and Pannonia Secunda. Capital city of Pannonia Secunda was Sirmium.

In 293, with the establishment of tetrarchy, the Roman Empire was split into four parts; Sirmium became one of the four capital cities of the Empire, the other three being Augusta Treverorum, Mediolanum, and Nicomedia (modern Trier, Milan and Izmit). During the tetrarchy, Sirmium was the capital of emperor Galerius. With the establishment of praetorian prefectures in 318, the capital of the prefecture of Illyricum was Sirmium.

Beginning in the 4th century, the city was an important Christian centre, and was a seat of the Episcopate of Sirmium. Four Christian councils were held in Sirmium. At the end of the 4th century, Sirmium was brought under the sway of the Goths, and later, was again annexed to the Eastern Roman Empire. In 441, Sirmium was conquered by the Huns, and after this conquest, it remained for more than a century in the hands of various Germanic tribes, such were Eastern Goths and Gepids.

For a short time, Sirmium was the center of the Gepid State and the king Cunimund minted golden coins in it. After 567, Sirmium was again incorporated into Eastern Roman Empire. The city was conquered and destroyed by Avars in 582. This event marked the end of the period of late Antiquity in the history of Sirmium.

11 luxurious golden belts of Avar handicraft dating to the 6th century was excavated in the vicinity.

=== After the Avar conquest ===
For the next two centuries Sirmium was a place of little importance. At the end of the 8th century, Sirmium belonged to the Frankish State. The historical role of Sirmium increased again in the 9th century, when it was part of the Bulgarian Empire. Pope Adrian II gave St Methodius the title of Archbishop of Sirmium. After having adopted Christianity, the Bulgarians restored in Sirmium the Christian Episcopate, having in mind old Christian traditions and the reputation this city had in the ancient world.

In the 11th century, Sirmium was a residence of Sermon, a duke of Syrmia, who was a vassal of the Bulgarian Samuil. After 1018, the city was again included into the Byzantine Empire, and since the end of the 11th century, Sirmium was a subject of a dispute between the Byzantine Empire and the Kingdom of Hungary, until 1180 when the Byzantine Empire gave up Sirmium, surrendering it to the Kingdom of Hungary. In the 11th century, a Byzantine province named Theme of Sirmium had its capital in this city. Emperor Basil II (976–1025) created administrative system in which Sirmium was a seat of strategos Serbias.

For a while, about 1451, the city was in possession of the Serbian despot Đurađ Branković. In 1521 the city came into Ottoman hands and it remained under the Ottoman rule for almost two centuries. According to Ottoman traveler Evliya Çelebi, Mitrovica had been conquered by the Bosnian sanjak bey Husrev-bey. It was renamed as "Dimitrofça".

The name of the mayor of the city was Dimitar and since the middle of the 16th century, the city was mostly populated with Muslims. According to the 1566/69 data, the population of the city was composed of 592 Muslim and 30 Christian houses, while according to the 1572 data, it was composed of 598 Muslim and 18 Christian houses.

According to the 1573 data, the city had 17 mosques and no Christian church. During the Ottoman rule, Sremska Mitrovica was the largest settlement in Syrmia, and was the administrative center of the Ottoman Sanjak of Syrmia. It was temporarily occupied by Austrian troops between 1688 and 1690. They finally took it in 1717 and took possession of it after signing Treaty of Passarowitz in 1718.

With the establishment of the Habsburg administration in 1718, the Muslim population fled from the city and was replaced with Serbian, Croatian, and German settlers. According to the 1765 data, the population of the city numbered 809 people, of whom 514 were Serbs and 290 Catholics.

Sremska Mitrovica was part of the Habsburg Military Frontier (Slavonian Krajina). In 1848–49, it was part of the Serbian Voivodship, a Serb autonomous region within Austrian Empire, but in 1849, it was returned under administration of the Military Frontier. With the abolition of the Slavonian Military Frontier in 1881, Sremska Mitrovica was included into Syrmia County, which was part of the Kingdom of Croatia-Slavonia within Austria-Hungary.

According to the 1910 census, the population of the city numbered 12,909 people, of which 8,793 spoke the Serbo-Croatian language (4,878 of those spoke Serbian and 3,915 spoke Croatian) and 2,341 German. The administrative area of the city (which did not included the city itself) had 32,012 inhabitants, of which 28,093 spoke Serbo-Croatian (27,022 of those spoke Serbian and 1,071 spoke Croatian) and 2,324 German. This was attacked during the 1914 Shelling of Belgrade which was the first battle of the First world war

=== After the First World War ===
In 1918, the Austro-Hungarian monarchy collapsed and the Syrmia region first became a part of the newly formed State of Slovenes, Croats and Serbs, and then, on 24 November 1918, the assembly of Syrmia, composed of Serbs in Ruma decided most of Syrmia (including Mitrovica) would join the Kingdom of Serbia. in case the State of Slovenes, Croats and Serbs would have not united with Kingdom of Serbia, which did occur on December 1 st. 1918, a week later.

Subsequently, on 1 December 1918, Kingdom of Serbia united with the Kingdom of Montenegro and the State of Slovenes, Croats and Serbs to form the Kingdom of Serbs, Croats and Slovenes (renamed to Yugoslavia in 1929). Between 1918 and 1922, Sremska Mitrovica was part of the Syrmia County, between 1922 and 1929 part of the Syrmia Oblast, between 1929 and 1931 part of the Drina Banovina, and, between 1931 and 1941, part of the Danube Banovina.

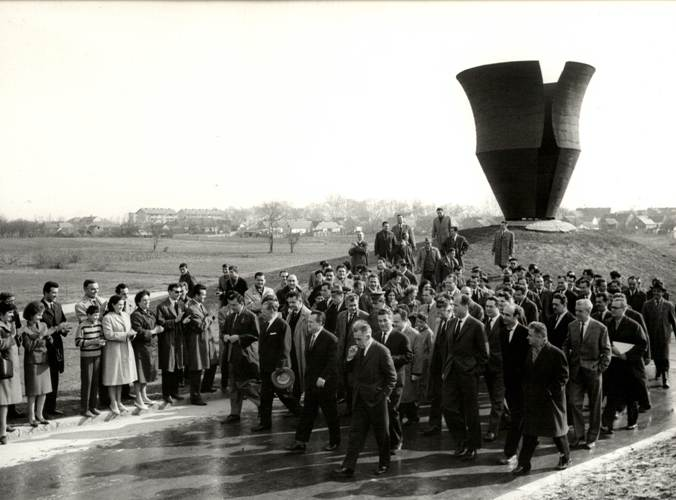
Josip Broz Tito visits the memorial park in Sremska Mitrovica, dedicated to the World War II victims in Syrmia

During World War II, the city was occupied by Axis troops and was attached to the Independent State of Croatia. During that time its name was changed to Hrvatska Mitrovica (meaning Croatian Mitrovica). One of the largest Nazi concentration/death camps in the Independent State of Croatia existed in Sremska Mitrovica and as many as 10,000 victims (Serbs, Jews, and antifascists) were killed here.

The Serbian Jewish population was to be interned in a concentration camp built first in Jarak and then at Zasavica. However, both locations proved to be too flooded for construction. The Germans had to abandon these locations and use Sajmište, which resulted in the destruction of 83% of Serbian Jewry.

In the Yugoslav wars in Sremska Mitrovica Prison, some Croatian prisoners of war were kept in this prison. The main prison facility; the largest known in Serbia, was open from November 1991 to August 1992 and was a scene where many prisoners were killed, tortured, abused and raped.

Beginning in 1944, the town was part of the Autonomous Province of Vojvodina within the new Socialist Yugoslavia and, from 1945, within the Socialist Republic of Serbia. From 1992 to 2003 it was part of the Federal Republic of Yugoslavia, which was then transformed into the state union of Serbia and Montenegro. Since the 2006 independence of Montenegro, Sremska Mitrovica is part of an independent Serbia.

== Inhabited places ==
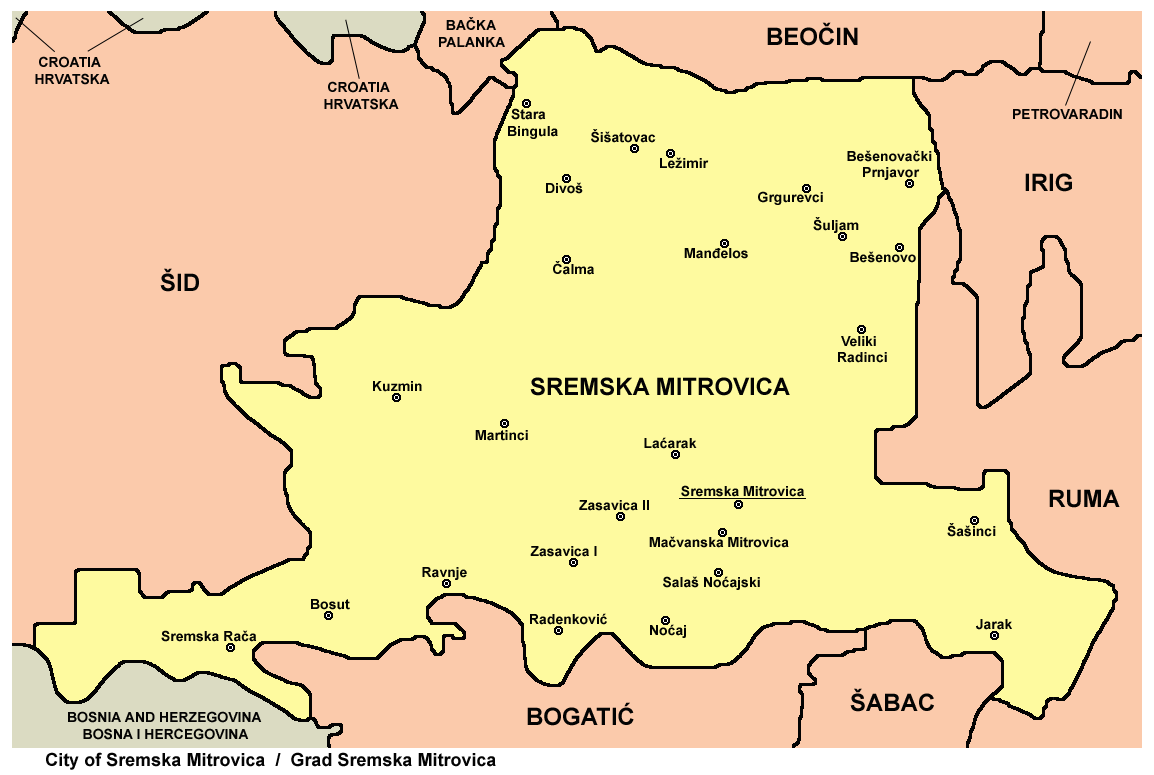
Map of the city of Sremska Mitrovica

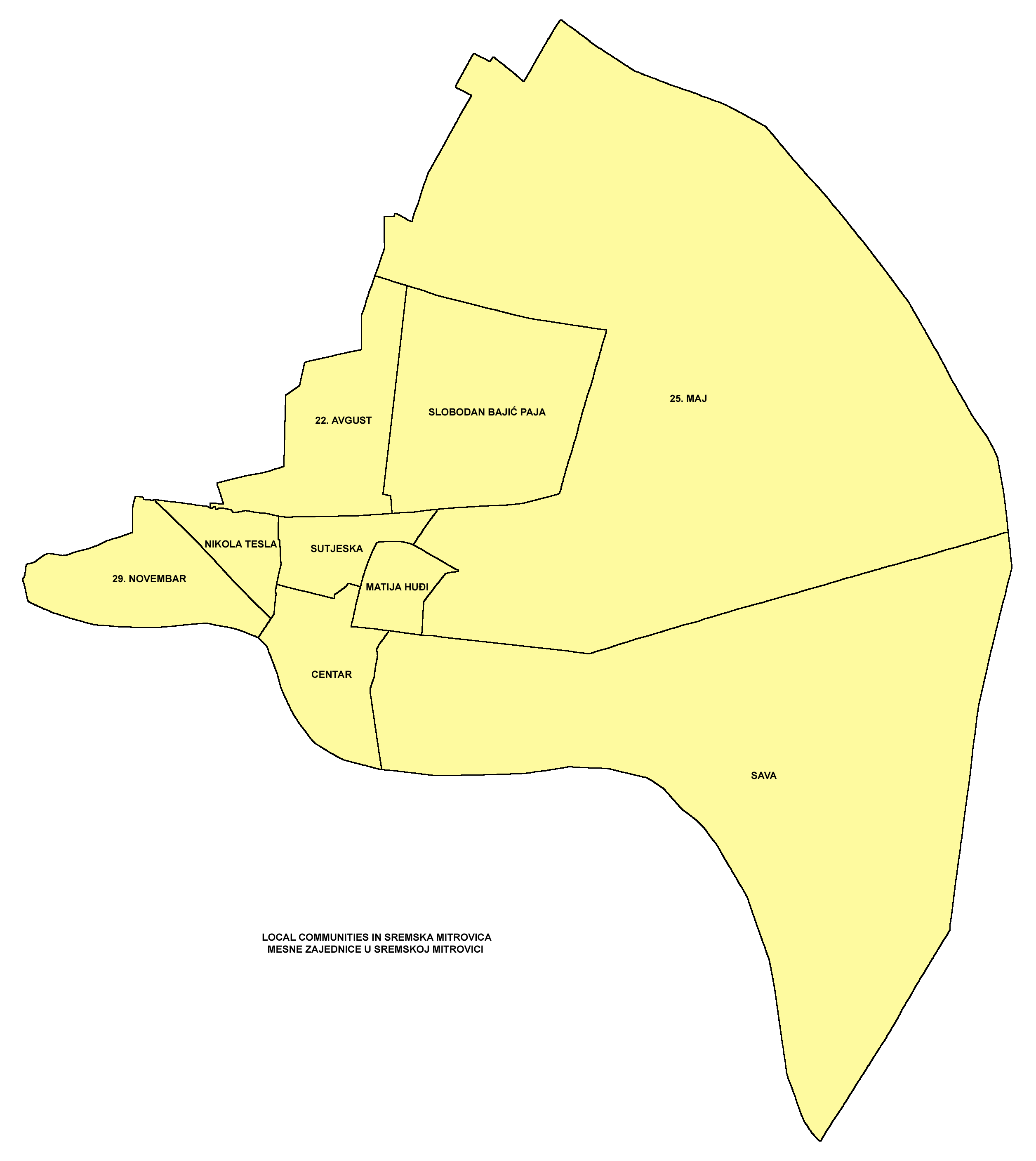
Map of local communities in urban Sremska Mitrovica

The city of Sremska Mitrovica includes the town of Mačvanska Mitrovica, and several villages. Villages on the northern bank of the river Sava, in the region of Syrmia:

- Bešenovački Prnjavor
- Bešenovo
- Bosut
- Čalma
- Divoš
- Grgurevci
- Jarak
- Kuzmin
- Laćarak
- Ležimir
- Manđelos
- Martinci
- Sremska Rača
- Stara Bingula
- Šašinci
- Šišatovac
- Šuljam
- Veliki Radinci

Villages on the southern bank of the river Sava, in the region of Mačva:

- Noćaj
- Radenković
- Ravnje
- Salaš Noćajski
- Zasavica I
- Zasavica II

== Demographics ==
Historical population
Year	Pop.	±% p.a.
1948	49,017	—
1953	52,959	+1.56%
1961	63,634	+2.32%
1971	78,391	+2.11%
1981	85,129	+0.83%
1991	85,328	+0.02%
2002	85,902	+0.06%
2011	79,940	−0.80%

According to the 2011 census results, the city administrative area has a population of 79,940 inhabitants.

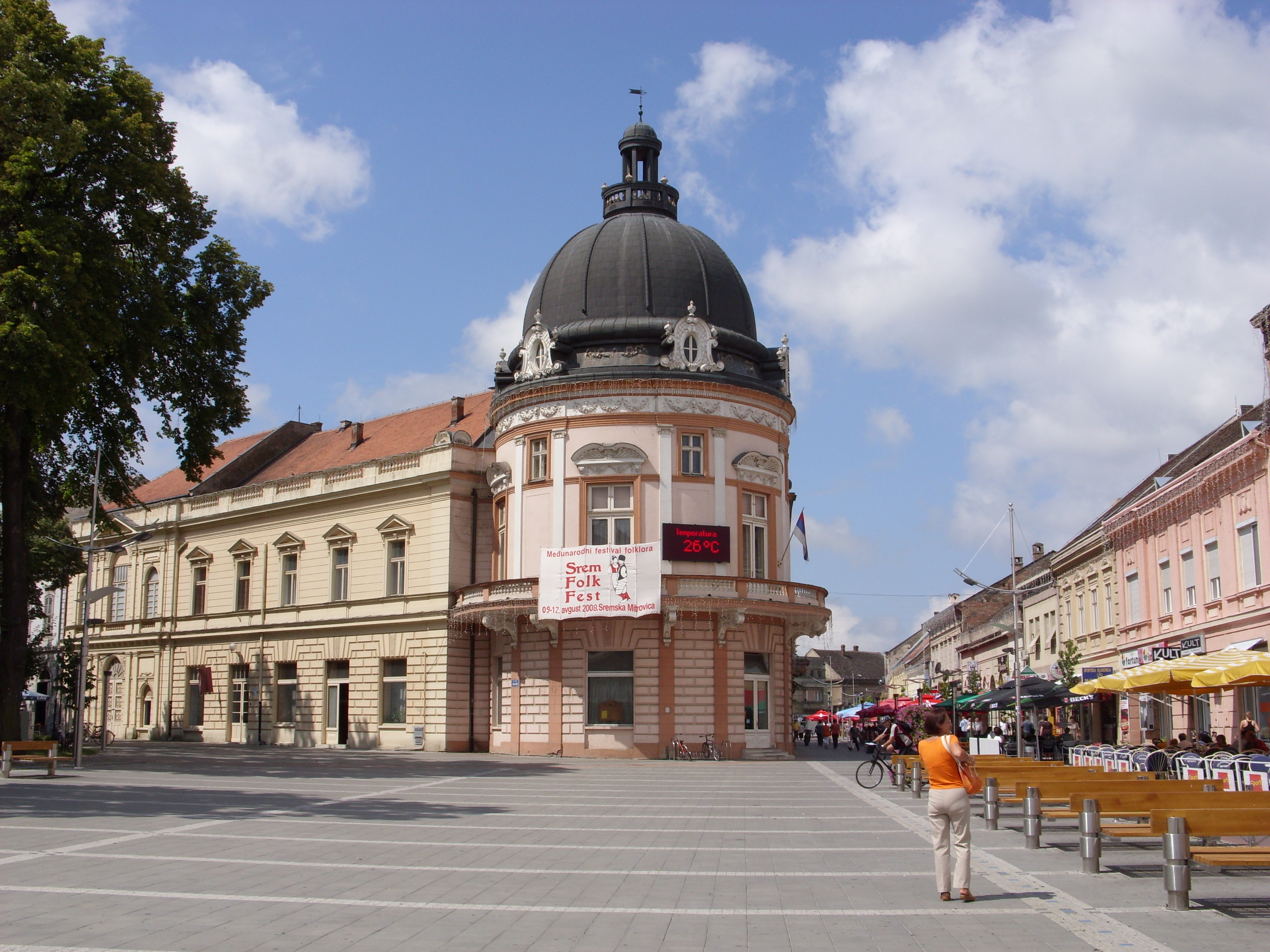
Sremska Mitrovica downtown

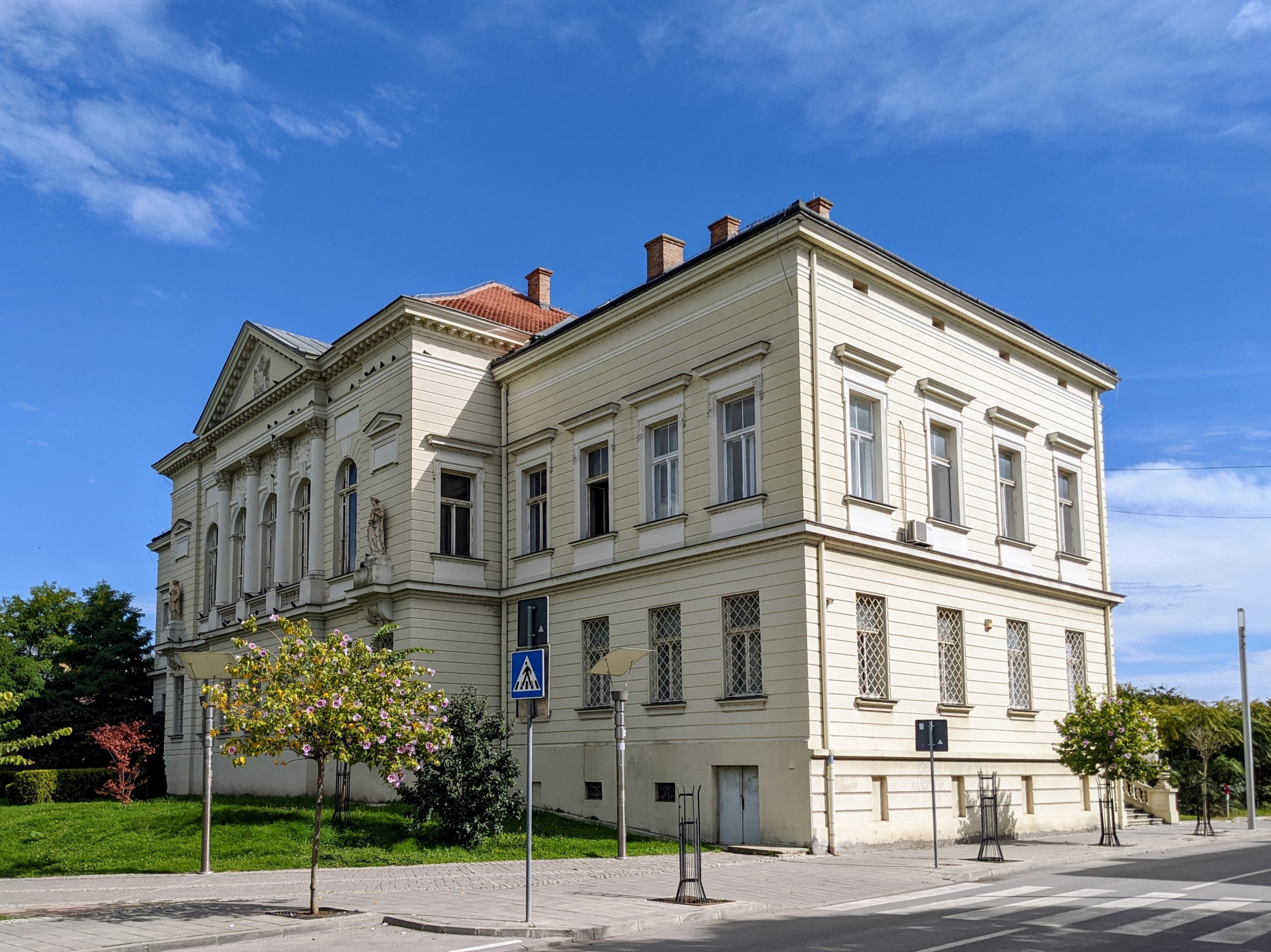
Museum of Srem

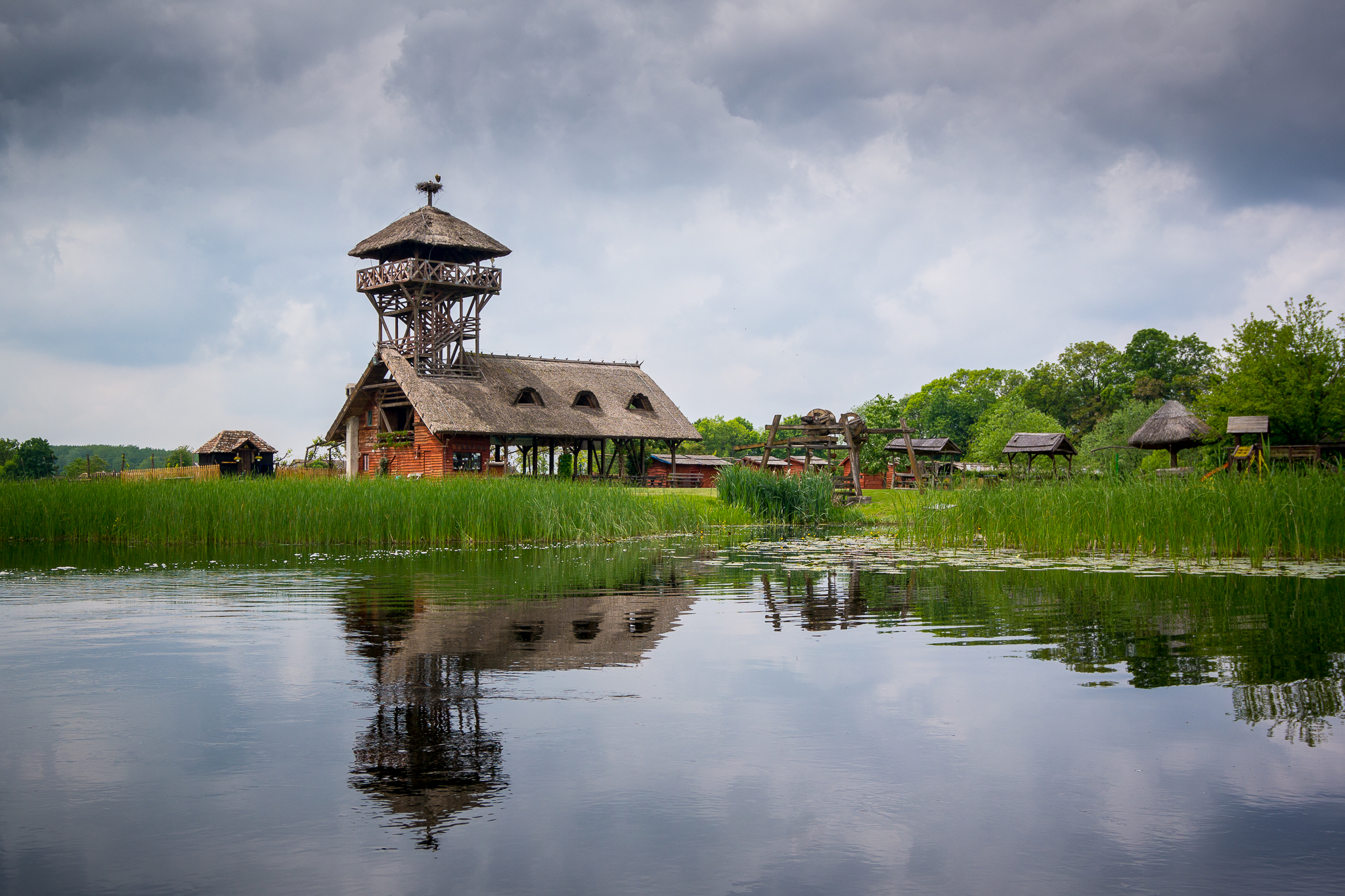
Zasavica Nature Reserve

=== Ethnic groups ===
Most of the settlements in the city have an ethnic Serb majority. Stara Bingula is an ethnically mixed settlement with a relative Serbian majority. The main concentration of ethnic minorities is in the urban area of the city.

The ethnic composition of the city:

Ethnic group	Population 2011	%
Serbs	69,849	87.38%
Croats	2,112	2.64%
Romani	1,194	1.49%
Hungarians	696	0.87%
Rusyns	620	0.78%
Ukrainians	534	0.67%
Yugoslavs	290	0.36%
Slovaks	281	0.35%
Montenegrins	131	0.16%
Macedonians	126	0.16%
Germans	103	0.13%
Others	4,004	5.01%
Total	79,940	

=== Religion ===
In 2002, the population of city of Sremska Mitrovica included 76,290 Orthodox Christians, 3,935 Roman Catholics, 252 Protestants and 106 Muslims. Orthodox Christians in Sremska Mitrovica are belonging to the Eparchy of Srem of the Serbian Orthodox Church. Catholics belong to the Diocese of Srijem, which has its seat in Sremska Mitrovica.

== Climate ==
Sremska Mitrovica has a humid subtropical climate bordering very closely on a humid continental climate (Köppen climate classification: Dfb) as well as an oceanic climate (Köppen climate classification: Cfb).

Climate data for Sremska Mitrovica (1991–2020, extremes 1961–2020)
Month	Jan	Feb	Mar	Apr	May	Jun	Jul	Aug	Sep	Oct	Nov	Dec	Year
Record high °C (°F)	18.8 (65.8)	23.7 (74.7)	28.9 (84.0)	31.6 (88.9)	34.8 (94.6)	36.8 (98.2)	40.7 (105.3)	39.6 (103.3)	37.6 (99.7)	30.2 (86.4)	25.0 (77.0)	22.0 (71.6)	40.7 (105.3)
Mean daily maximum °C (°F)	4.2 (39.6)	7.3 (45.1)	13.2 (55.8)	18.8 (65.8)	23.4 (74.1)	27.0 (80.6)	29.0 (84.2)	29.3 (84.7)	24.1 (75.4)	18.6 (65.5)	11.5 (52.7)	5.0 (41.0)	17.6 (63.7)
Daily mean °C (°F)	0.6 (33.1)	2.3 (36.1)	6.9 (44.4)	12.3 (54.1)	17.3 (63.1)	20.7 (69.3)	22.1 (71.8)	21.9 (71.4)	16.9 (62.4)	11.9 (53.4)	6.8 (44.2)	1.6 (34.9)	11.8 (53.2)
Mean daily minimum °C (°F)	−2.7 (27.1)	−1.9 (28.6)	1.5 (34.7)	6.1 (43.0)	11.1 (52.0)	14.3 (57.7)	15.4 (59.7)	15.3 (59.5)	11.1 (52.0)	6.9 (44.4)	3.0 (37.4)	−1.3 (29.7)	6.6 (43.9)
Record low °C (°F)	−29.5 (−21.1)	−26.5 (−15.7)	−17.3 (0.9)	−7.8 (18.0)	−0.3 (31.5)	3.0 (37.4)	6.4 (43.5)	5.8 (42.4)	−2.0 (28.4)	−6.0 (21.2)	−13.5 (7.7)	−21.3 (−6.3)	−29.5 (−21.1)
Average precipitation mm (inches)	38.1 (1.50)	34.6 (1.36)	37.6 (1.48)	44.8 (1.76)	68.1 (2.68)	75.4 (2.97)	59.7 (2.35)	50.9 (2.00)	56.6 (2.23)	56.8 (2.24)	48.8 (1.92)	45.7 (1.80)	617.1 (24.30)
Average precipitation days (≥ 0.1 mm)	12.8	11.4	10.8	11.3	13.2	11.4	9.5	7.9	9.8	10.1	11.2	12.5	131.9
Average snowy days	6.8	5.7	2.8	0.4	0.0	0.0	0.0	0.0	0.0	0.1	2.1	5.1	23.0
Average relative humidity (%)	87.8	81.7	72.5	68.2	69.0	71.4	70.7	69.8	74.3	78.5	84.5	88.7	76.4
Mean monthly sunshine hours	63.6	95.1	159.2	197.5	245.2	262.0	297.0	288.0	198.5	156.2	90.5	53.2	2,106
Source: Republic Hydrometeorological Service of Serbia

== Economy ==
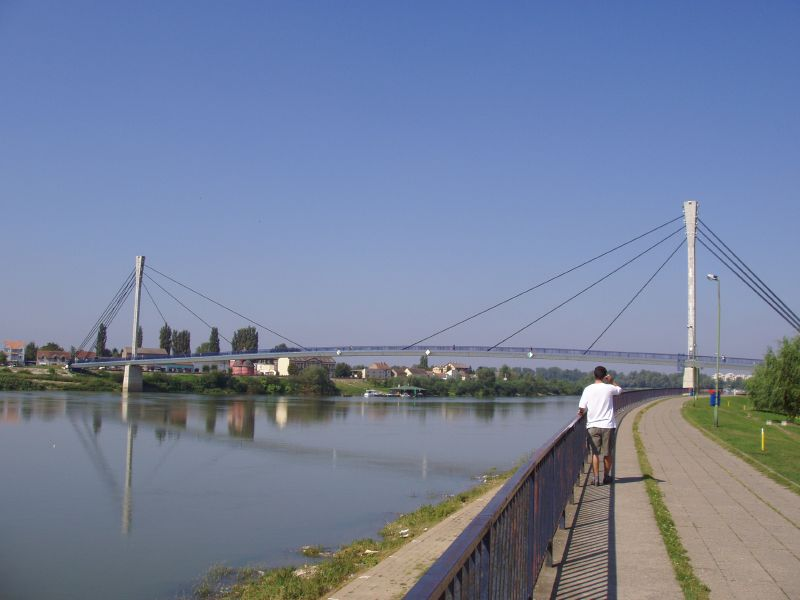
The footbridge of St. Irenaeus of Sirmium, across Sava river is the biggest footbridge in Serbia.

The following table gives a preview of total number of registered people employed in legal entities per their core activity (as of 2018):

Activity	Total
Agriculture, forestry and fishing	645
Mining and quarrying	16
Manufacturing	5,402
Electricity, gas, steam and air conditioning supply	233
Water supply; sewerage, waste management and remediation activities	342
Construction	958
Wholesale and retail trade, repair of motor vehicles and motorcycles	2,887
Transportation and storage	1,080
Accommodation and food services	447
Information and communication	167
Financial and insurance activities	334
Real estate activities	35
Professional, scientific and technical activities	749
Administrative and support service activities	486
Public administration and defense; compulsory social security	1,610
Education	1,339
Human health and social work activities	1,820
Arts, entertainment and recreation	318
Other service activities	332
Individual agricultural workers	1,098
Total	20,298

== Sport ==
- KAF Sirmium Legionaries, an American Football club from Sremska Mitrovica. This is the first club of American Football in Serbia.
- FK Srem, a football club from Sremska Mitrovica.
- FK Radnički Sremska Mitrovica, a football club from Sremska Mitrovica which went bankrupt in 2025.
- KK Val, a canoe club from Sremska Mitrovica.

== Notable residents ==
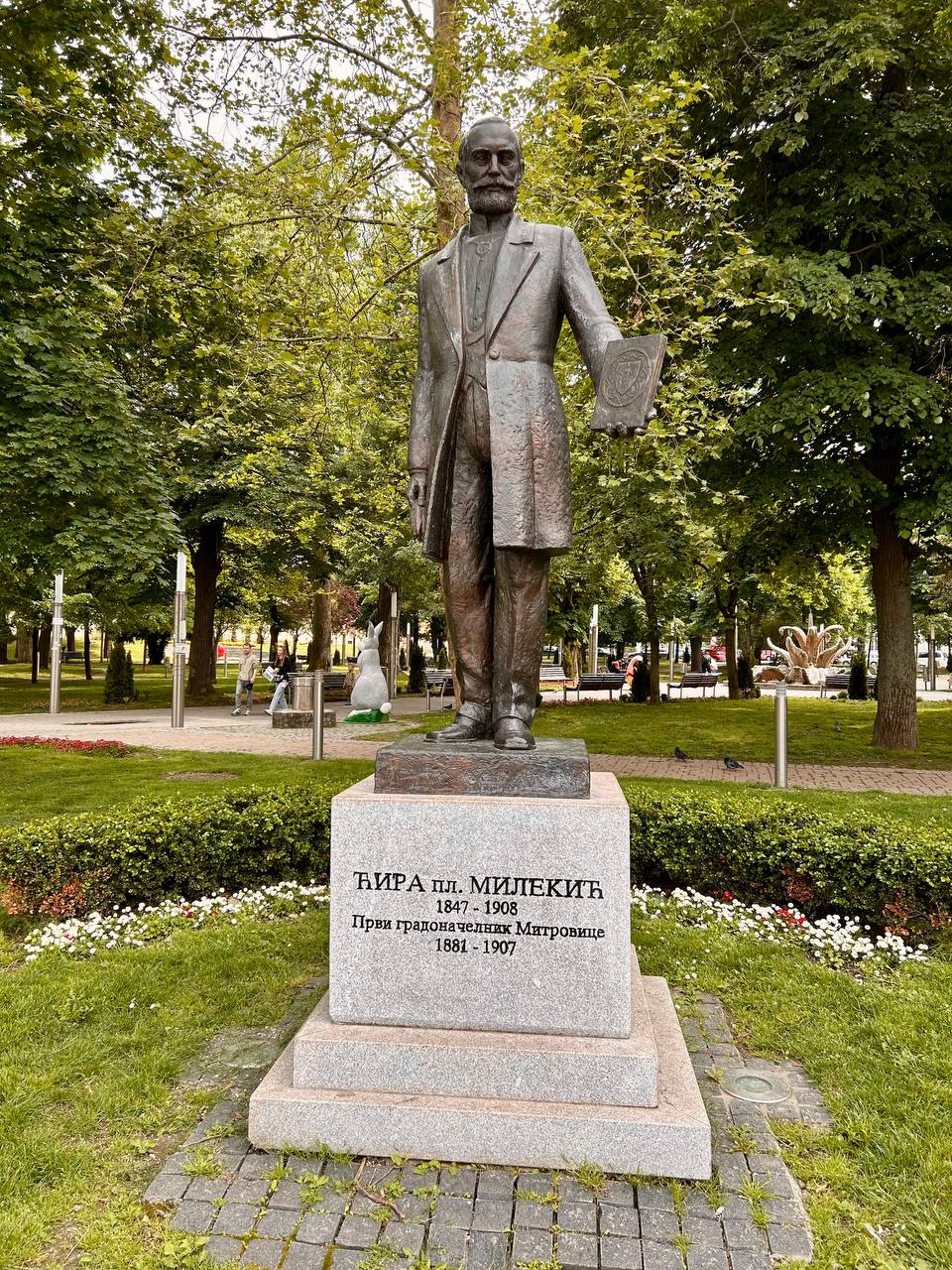
Major Ćira Milekić

=== Roman emperors ===
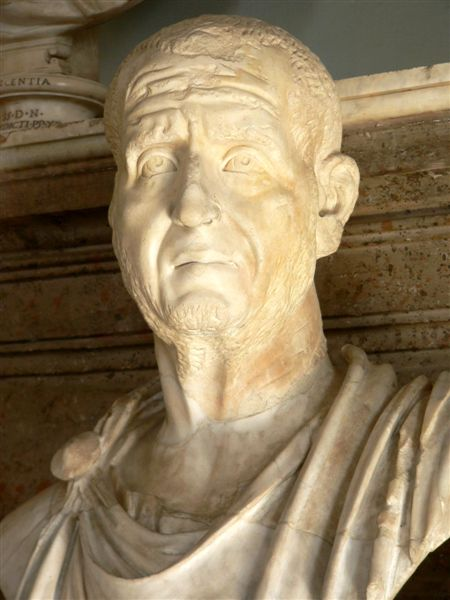
Traianus Decius, Roman Emperor (249–51), born in the village of Budalia, near Sirmium

Ten Roman emperors were born in the city and its environs:

- Decius Traian (249–51)
- Herennius Etruscus (251–51)
- Hostilian (251–51)
- Claudius II (268–270)
- Quintillus (270)
- Aurelian (270–75)
- Probus (276–82)
- Maximianus Herculius (285–310)
- Constantius II (337–61)
- Gratian (367–83)

The last emperor of the united Roman Empire, Theodosius I (378–95), became emperor in Sirmium. In 260, the usurpers Ingenuus and Regalianus declared themselves emperors there. Many other Roman emperors spent some time in Sirmium, including Marcus Aurelius, who likely wrote his Meditations in the city.

=== Classical antiquity ===
- Marcus Aurelius, Roman emperor (161–180), used Sirmium as a residence in between pannonian military campaigns 170–180
- Maximinus, Roman emperor (235–238), ruled from residence in Sirmium.
- Herennius Etruscus, Roman emperor (251), born in Sirmium.
- Hostilian, Roman emperor (251), born in Sirmium
- Decius Traian, Roman emperor (249–251), born in village Budalia near Sirmium.
- Ingenuus, Roman emperor (260), proclaimed himself emperor in Sirmium.
- Regalianus, Roman emperor (260), proclaimed himself emperor in Sirmium.
- Claudius II, Roman emperor (268–270), born in Sirmium and spent most of his life there.
- Quintillus, Roman emperor (270), born in Sirmium
- Aurelian, Roman emperor (270–275), born in Sirmium.
- Probus, Roman emperor (276-282), born in Sirmium.
- Maximianus Herculius, Roman emperor (285-310), born near Sirmium.
- Galerius, Roman emperor (305-311), ruled as Caesar during the Tetrarchy from residence in Sirmium (293-296).
- Crispus, a Caesar of the Roman Empire. He was proclaimed Caesar in Sirmium in 317.
- Constantine II, a Caesar of the Roman Empire. He was proclaimed Caesar in Sirmium in 317.
- Vetranion, Roman emperor. Proclaimed himself emperor in Sirmium (in 350).
- Constantius II, Roman emperor (337-361), born in Sirmium.
- Gratian, Roman emperor (367-383), born in Sirmium.
- Theodosius I the Great, Roman emperor (378-395). He became emperor in Sirmium.
- Valerius Licinius, prefect of the Diocese of Pannonia with residence in Sirmium (308-314).
- Aurelius Victor, prefect of the Pannonia Secunda province, wrote a History of Rome under the emperor Julian.
- Leontius, prefect in Sirmium (426).

=== Middle ages ===
- Cunimund, king of the Gepids with residence in Sirmium.
- Sermon, duke of Syrmia (11th century).

=== Modern period ===
- Mira Banjac, Serbian actress
- Slobodan Čikić, Serbian politician
- Vaso Čubrilović, Serbian historian
- Robert Frangeš-Mihanović, Croatian sculptor
- Petar Gburčik, Serbian scientist
- Nikola Hristić (1818–1911), Serbian politician
- Branislav Ivanović, Serbian footballer
- Siniša Kovačević, Serbian author
- Petar Kralj, Serbian actor
- Mileva Marić, Serbian scientist
- Đorđe Marković Koder (1806–1891), Serbian writer
- Dejan Milovanović, Serbian footballer
- Stjepan Musulin, Croatian linguist and lexicographer
- Milijana Nikolić, operatic mezzo-soprano
- Boško Palkovljević Pinki, People's Hero of Yugoslavia
- Veljko Petrović, Serbian poet
- Igor Pisanjuk (1989), Canadian football player
- Mirjana Puhar (1995-2015), Serbian - American model
- Ilarion Ruvarac (1832–1905), Serbian Churchman and historian
- Mara Švel-Gamiršek (1900–1975), Croatian writer
- Dragana Tomašević, Serbian discus thrower
- Zlatko Tomčić, Croatian politician
- Slavko Vorkapić, Serbian-American film director and editor
- Srđan Dinčić, Serbian stand up comedian and satirist

== International relations ==
=== Twin towns – sister cities ===
Sremska Mitrovica is twinned with:

- (Bosnia and Herzegovina) Banja Luka, Bosnia-Herzegovina
- Dunaújváros, Hungary

== See also ==
- List of cities, towns and villages in Vojvodina
- List of cities in Serbia
- Councils of Sirmium
- Sremska Mitrovica railway station
- Sremska Mitrovica Gymnasium
- Historical Archive of Srem
