= Predrag Miletić =

Serbian actor

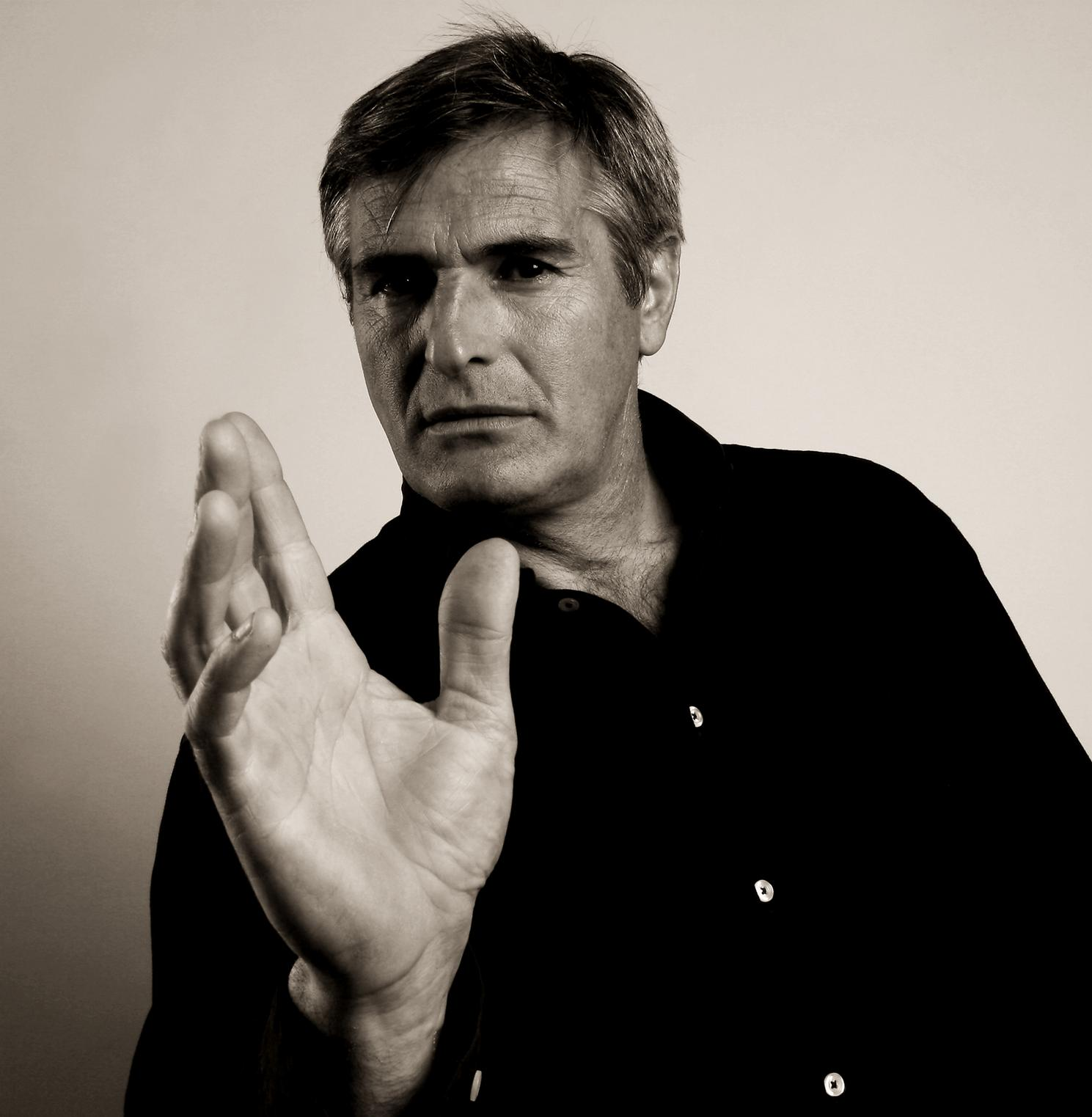
- Born: 26 September 1952 (age 73); Niš, SR Serbia, SFR Yugoslavia (today's Serbia)
- Other name: Peđa
- Education: Faculty of Dramatic Arts
- Occupations: Actor and opera singer
- Years active: 1972–present
- Spouse(s): Gordana Miletić (1979–present)
- Children: Vuk Miletić, Tadija Miletić
- Website: https://www.imdb.com/name/nm0587294/

Predrag Miletić, (Serbian Cyrillic: Предраг Милетић; born 26 September 1952), is a Serbian film, television, and theatre actor. Since 1981, Predrag Miletić has been a full-time member of the National Theatre in Belgrade, where he has appeared in more than 50 plays. Since 2014 he is the chairman of the board of the Puppet Theatre "Pinocchio" and since 2015 is the President of the Program Committee of the International Festival of Monodrama and Mime in Zemun.

== Early life ==
Predrag Miletić was born in Niš, Socialist Federal Republic of Yugoslavia (now Serbia). His mother, Ružica Miletić (née Ilić), was a housewife, and his father, Lieutenant Vladimir Miletić (1919–2010), was a Yugoslav intelligence officer, winner of a number of decorations, including two medals for bravery. Miletić has one sister, Slavica. He is of Serbian ancestry, and Bosnian ancestry on his father's side. As a child, Predrag lived in Niš with her family, and moved to Belgrade in order to study at the Faculty of Dramatic Arts.

== Education ==
After finishing high school, he has entered the drama studio at the National Theatre in Niš. After two years in the studio, he has enrolled Faculty of Drama Arts in Belgrade, in the class of professor Ognjenka Milićević, with the assistant Vladimir Jevtović. During the studies had a professional expertise with Olga Skovran and with Eva Ruth-Ronen from Royal Academy of Dramatic Art in London. Graduated on 22. jun 1981. with performance "I'm selling wrecked Fića, maybe in pieces" by Bratislav Petković.

== Career ==
He was a full-time member of National Theatre in Niš even before the faculty, from 1972 to 1976. Since 1981, Predrag Miletić has been member of the National Theatre in Belgrade, where he has appeared in more than 40 dramas. Also, he has appeared in almost all Serbian series since 1980, and has shot a number of domestic and foreign films. He is the only member of the Serbian National theater who has been employed professionally both in the opera and drama department. He was a member of the "Z Teater", run by actor and director Milenko Zablaćanski, and he participated in the famous Edinburgh International Festival in Edinburgh, Scotland. His first main role was in André Roussin's La Mamma as Antoni in Terazije Theatre in Belgrade.

He wrote a book about his journey from Beograd to the Serbian monastery Hilandar on Mount Athos in Greece by bicycle with his godfather Oliver Njego, solo-singer from National Theater. The book is "Biciklom do Hilandara". ("By bicycle to Hilandar")

Since 2014, he is the president of the board of Puppet Theatre "Pinocchio", and since 2015, he is the president of the program council of the international Festival of monodrama and mime in Zemun, Belgrade.

== Performances ==
Predrag Miletić participated in more than 100 plays, TV film and series, movies and operas throughout his career, including:

=== Movies ===
- Balkan Express (1983)
- Kako zasmejati gospodara (1988)
- Balkan Express 2 (1988)
- Sveto mesto (1990)

=== Television ===
- Sedam sekretara SKOJ-a (1981)
- Sivi dom (1986)
- Vuk Karadžić (1986)
- Drugarica ministarka (1989)
- Kraj dinastije Obrenović (1995)
- Bitter Fruits (2008)
- Zvezdara (2015)

=== Stage ===
- La mamma (1979)
- Sporting Lajf (1979)
- Kanjoš Macedonović (1989)
- La Betia (1993)
- The Taming of the Shrew (1993)
- Pobratim (1994)
- Razvojni put Bore Šnajdera (1995)
- Velika drama (2002)
- Zečiji nasip (2004)
- Vitamins (2004)
- Rebecca (2012)

== Personal life ==
Predrag married Gordana Miletić (née Krstić) in Niš in May 1979. With her, he has two sons, Vuk and Tadija, both of them working in theater.

== See also ==
- Ognjenka Milićević
- Milenko Zablaćanski
