= Stara Bingula =

Stara Bingula Стара Бингула (Serbian) Stara Bingula (Croatian)
- Village (Selo)
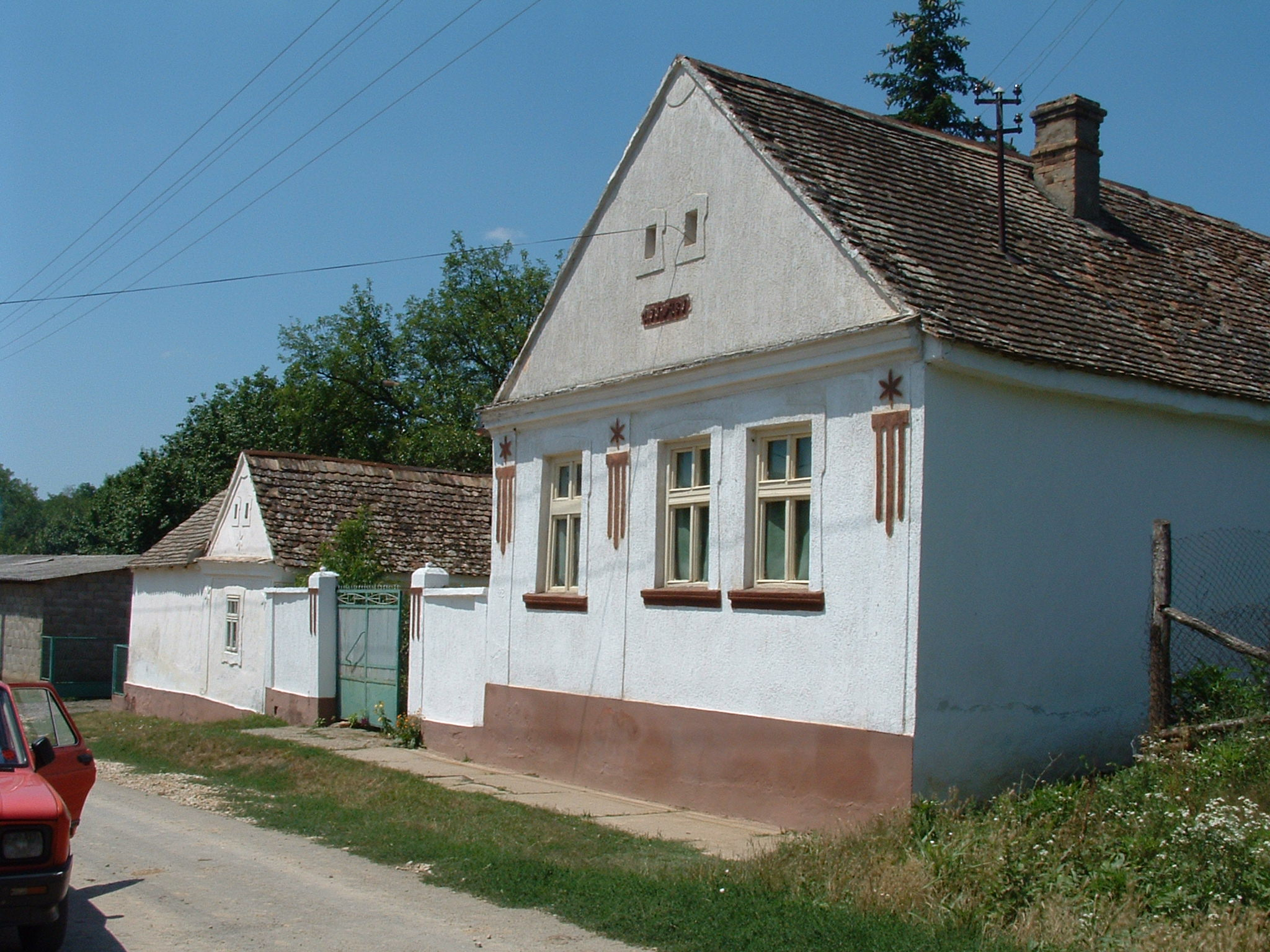

- Location within Vojvodina Location within Serbia Location within Europe
- Coordinates: 45°09′N 19°29′E
- Country: Serbia
- Province: Vojvodina
- Region: Syrmia
- District: Srem
- Municipality: Sremska Mitrovica

Population (2002)
  - Total: 190
- Time zone: UTC+1 (CET)
  - Summer (DST): UTC+2 (CEST)

Stara Bingula (Serbian Cyrillic: Стара Бингула) is a village located in the Sremska Mitrovica municipality, in the Syrmia District of Vojvodina, Serbia. This is the only ethnically mixed settlement in the Sremska Mitrovica municipality (with a relative Serb majority). Village population numbering 190 people (2002 census).

== Name ==
In Serbian, the village is known as Stara Bingula (Стара Бингула), and in Hungarian as Óbingula.

== Ethnic groups (2002 census) ==
- Serbs = 58 (30.53%)
- Croats = 55 (28.95%)
- Slovaks = 32 (16.84%)
- Rusyns = 23 (12.11%)
- others.

== Historical population ==
- 1961: 371
- 1971: 300
- 1981: 255
- 1991: 205
- 2002: 190

== See also ==
- List of places in Serbia
- List of cities, towns and villages in Vojvodina
