= Slobodan Čikić =

Serbian politician

Slobodan Čikić (Serbian Cyrillic: Слободан Чикић; born 19 May 1983) is a politician in Serbia. He has served in the Assembly of Vojvodina since 2020 as a member of the Serbian Progressive Party.

== Private career ==
Čikić was born in 1983. He lives in Sremska Mitrovica and holds a Bachelor of Science degree in Management Engineering. He has been president of the football club Sloga in northern Mačva.

In 2011, Čikić was licensed by the Sremska Mitrovica government to rent space in his family's traditional household for tourists; this occurred at a time when the city was facing a tourism crisis after its last hotel closed. Serbian president Aleksandar Vučić visited the household on a visit to the community in 2019.

== Politician ==
=== Municipal politics ===
Čikić was given the thirty-eighth position on the Progressive Party's electoral list for the Sremska Mitrovica city assembly in the 2016 Serbian local elections. The list won a majority victory with thirty-five out of sixty-one mandates. Čikić was not initially elected, but he received a mandate as the replacement for another party member on 11 August 2016. He served for the next four years and did not seek re-election at the municipal level in 2020.

=== Assembly of Vojvodina ===
Čikić received the thirty-second position on the Progressive Party's Aleksandar Vučić — For Our Children list in the 2020 Vojvodina provincial election and was elected when the list won a majority victory with seventy-six out of 120 mandates. He is now a member of the assembly committee on security and the committee on cooperation with the national assembly committees in exercise of the competencies of the province.
