= Oliver Njego =

Serbian operatic baritone (born 1959)

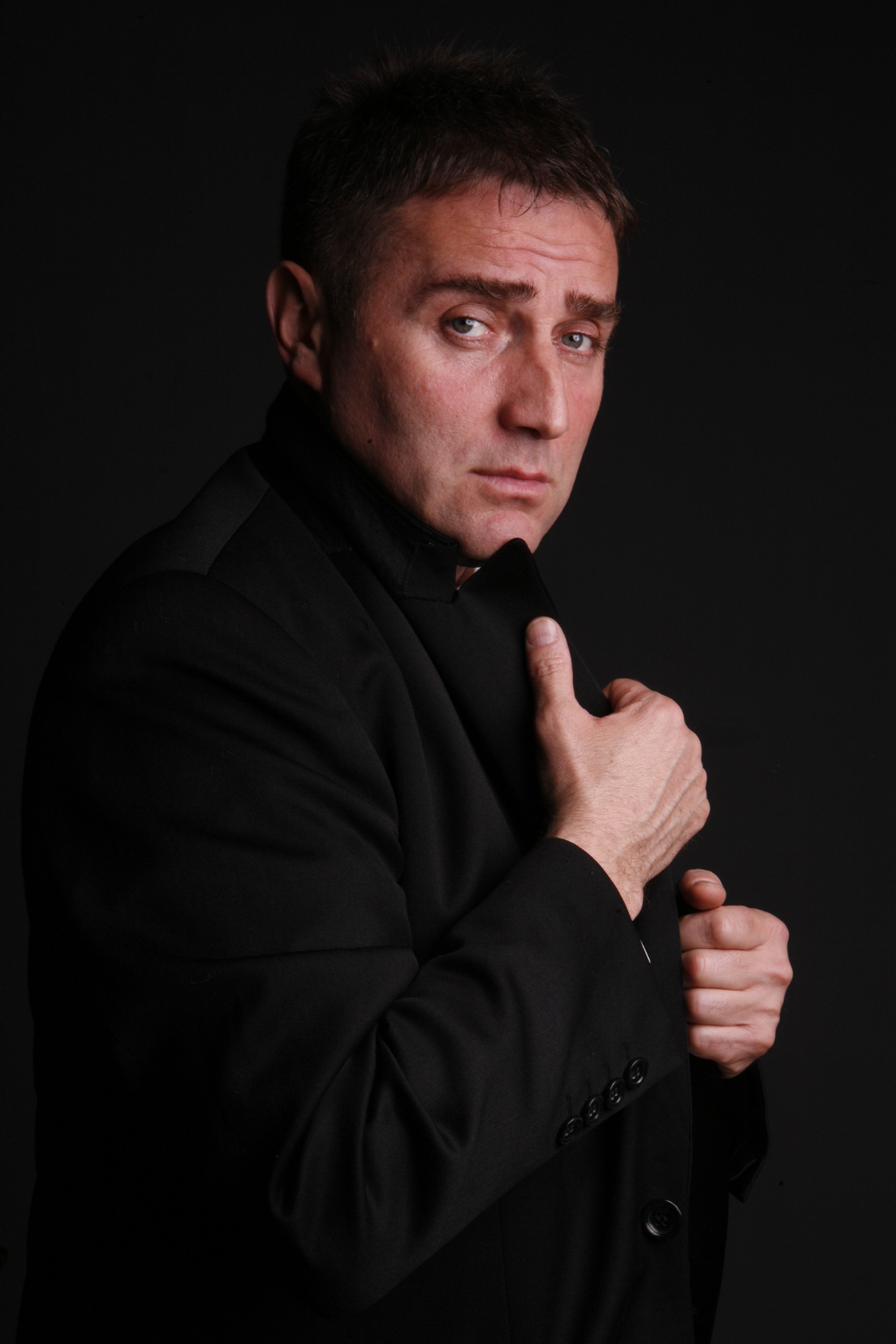
- Oliver Njego
- Born: 19 September 1959 (age 66); Niš, Serbia (Yugoslavia)
- Occupations: Opera singer, baritone
- Awards: Order of Karađorđe's Star

Oliver Njego (Serbian Cyrillic: Оливер Њего, pronounced [ɔ̌liʋɛr ɲɛ̌ːɡɔ], born 19 September 1959) is a Serbian opera singer, baritone, and professor at the University of Kragujevac, who also crossed over into popular music. For his exceptional contributions and achievements in the field of opera art, he was awarded the Order of Karađorđe's Star in 2025 by decree of the President of Serbia.

== Biography ==
Njego was born on 19 September 1959 in Niš. He graduated in 1990 at the Faculty of Music Art in Belgrade in the class of Professor Radmila Bakočević. In 1991 becomes the member of National Theatre in Belgrade opera department, where he performed in Gioachino Rossini's The Barber of Seville, Donizetti's L'elisir d'amore, and many other famous operas. He has won three major awards at the competition Belgrade Spring, and won many prizes in various cultural events throughout the country and the world. Until now, he has performed in China, United Arab Emirates, France, Italy, Korea, Great Britain, Hungary, Republic of Macedonia, and many other countries. With his godfather Predrag Miletić, actor of the National Theater, he has traveled for several years in a row with a bike to the monastery Hilandar on Mount Athos in Greece. Their journey was published in the book Biciklom do Hilandara by Predrag Miletić.

== Personal life ==
He is married to Jasna, with whom he has three children.

== Sources ==
- Jasna i Oliver Njego: Rupice na njenim obrazima, Politika, 26.11.2006.
- Biciklom do Hilandara ("By bicycle to Hilandar") by Predrag Miletić. ISBN 86-905255-0-5
