= Ljiljana Blagojević =

Serbian actress (born 1955)

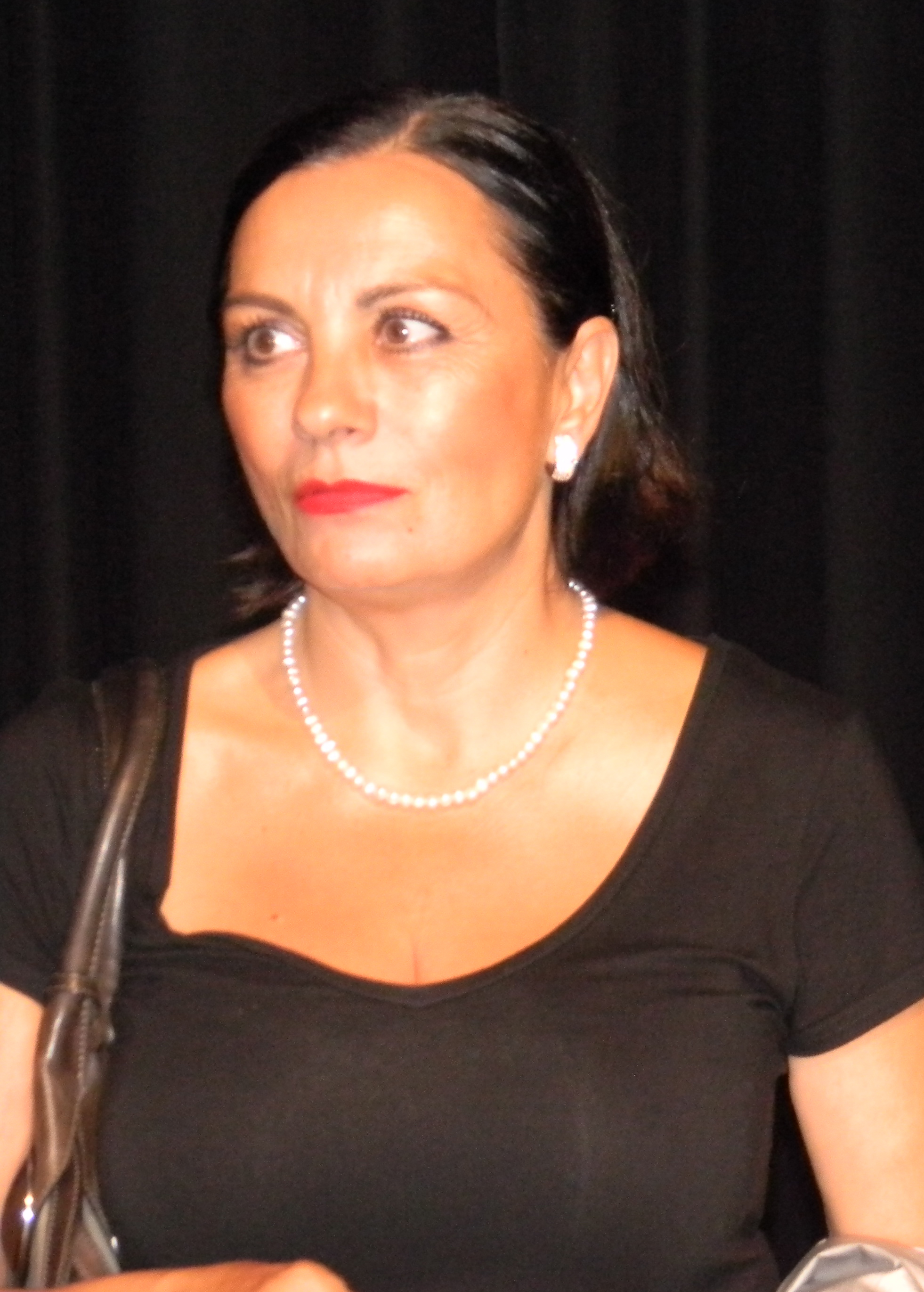
- Born: November 5, 1955 (age 70); Belgrade, SR Serbia, SFR Yugoslavia

Ljiljana Blagojević (Serbian Cyrillic: Љиљана Благојевић; born 5 November 1955) is a Serbian theater, film, and television actress.

Her roles include Lucio Fulci's Aenigma.

== Biography ==
=== Early life ===
Blagojević was born on 5 November 1955 in the Zemun neighborhood of Belgrade, SR Serbia, SFR Yugoslavia. Her parents, Vlado and Spasenija, are from Bijeljina, present-day Bosnia and Herzegovina. Following their divorce, Ljiljana lived with her mother.

=== Personal life ===
She is married to Serbian playwright Siniša Kovačević, with whom she has a daughter named Kalina Kovačević, who is also an actress.
