= Ognjenka Milićević =

Bosnian Serb director, acting professor and theatre expert

- Born: 26 December 1927; Banja Luka (Kingdom of Yugoslavia)
- Died: 23 January 2008 (aged 80); Belgrade, Serbia
- Occupations: Theatre director, film director, acting professor
- Years active: 1952–2008
- Spouse: Sergej Lukač
- Website: https://www.imdb.com/name/nm0587439/

Ognjenka Milićević Lukač (Serbian Cyrillic: Огњенка Милићевић; 26 December 1927 – 23 January 2008) was a Bosnian Serb director, acting professor, and theatre expert.

== Background ==
She was the daughter of the prominent publicist and professor Nika Milićević (1897–1980). She translated dozens of works from Russian to Serbian language. She is the author of numerous essays, studies, and avocations from theatrics, acting, and directing. She was the author and the main editor of the monographs of the Ljiljana Krstić and Petar Kralj, regarding Dobričin prsten award laureate. She was a member of the managing council of the Atelje 212 Theatre, and later Yugoslav Drama Theatre. Founder and supervisor of the drama studio in the National Theater in Sarajevo, founder of Festival of monodrama and mime in Belgrade, and teacher of the Acting and History of the theater in the Faculty of the Dramatic Arts in Belgrade.

== Career ==
Milićević studied at the Saint Petersburg State Theatre Arts Academy and the Faculty of Drama Arts in Belgrade, where she graduated in 1952. She worked as a director at the National Theater in Sarajevo (1948–1950), and at the National Theatre in Belgrade (1950–1959). Some of her famous students include Milenko Zablaćanski, Predrag Miletić, etc.
