= Šuljam =

Šuljam Шуљам (Serbian)
- Village (Selo)
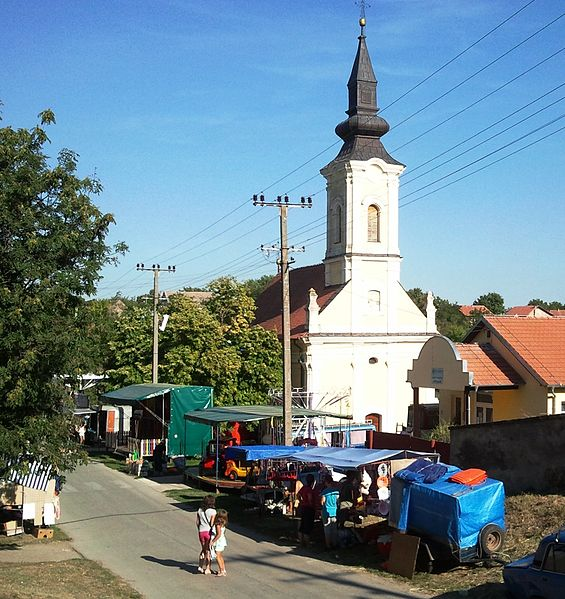

- Location within Vojvodina Location within Serbia Location within Europe
- Coordinates: 45°05′N 19°40′E
- Country: Serbia
- Province: Vojvodina
- Region: Syrmia
- District: Srem
- Municipality: Sremska Mitrovica

Area
  - Total: 10.2 sq mi (26.5 km^{2})

Population (2022)
  - Total: 531
- Time zone: UTC+1 (CET)
  - Summer (DST): UTC+2 (CEST)
- Postal code: 22213

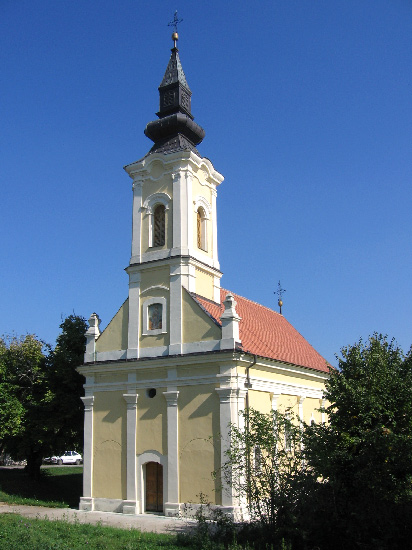
Serbian Orthodox church

Šuljam (Serbian Cyrillic: Шуљам) is a village located in the Sremska Mitrovica municipality, in the Syrmia District of Serbia. It is situated in the autonomous province of Vojvodina. The village has a Serb ethnic majority and its population was 531 people in the 2022 census.

== Name ==
In Serbian, the village is known as Šuljam(Шуљам), in Croatian as Šuljam, and in Hungarian as Sulyom.

== Historical population ==
- 1761: 590
- 1793: 513
- 1810: 550
- 1961: 952
- 1971: 863
- 1981: 777
- 1991: 741
- 2002: 744
- 2022: 531
