= Festival of monodrama and mime =

Theater festival in Belgrade, Serbia

Festival of Monodrama and Mime
- Location: Belgrade, Serbia
- Founded: 1973 (53 years ago)
- Founded by: Ljubiša Ružić, Ognjenka Milićević
- Selector: Milovan Zdravković
- Editor-in-chief: Radomir Putnik
- Festival date: June, July
- Website: festmono-pan.org.rs, official website

The Festival of Monodrama and Mime is a Serbian theatre festival, dedicated to mimes and monodramas.

It is held annually near the end of June or the first week in July in Belgrade, Serbia, and it is traditionally held within the Puppet Theatre "Pinocchio".

Festival of Monodrama and Mime participants are awarded in five different categories: best monodrama, best mime, most successful participant, an award for ingenuity, and the Audience's award.

== Foundation ==
The festival was founded in 1973 by Ljubiša Ružić and Ognjenka Milićević.

== Leadership ==
Following the decision of the Municipal Assembly of Zemun, in 2015 new members of the council and director of the festival were appointed. Predrag Miletić, an actor of the National Theatre, was chosen as head of the festival. Radomir Putnik, Rada Đuričin, Igor Bojović, Rastko Janković, Stevan Rodić and Stanivuk Vanja were chosen as members. Borislav Balać was appointed as festival director, and Milovan Zdravković was selected as selector of the festival. The editors of the festival are Radomir Putnik and Tadija Miletić.

== Festivаl publications ==
In addition to the regular annual program booklet, the festival has published six books from several authors:

- Antologijа savremene monodrаme, Rаdomir Putnik
- Pаnorаmа monodrаmа, Rаdomir Putnik
- Pozorišne i televizijske monodrаme, Rаdomir Putnik
- Moje monodrаme, Rаdа Đuričin
- Sаmi sa publikom, Mirjаnа Ojdаnić
- Zemunskа pozorjа, Alojz Ujes

== See also ==
- Culture in Belgrade
- List of theatre festivals
