= Belgrade Dance Institute =

Higher education institution for dance in Belgrade, Serbia

- Институт за уметничку игру
- Type: Private, accredited higher education institution
- Established: 2014
- Parent institution: Faculty of Engineering Management, Union – Nikola Tesla University
- Location: Belgrade, Serbia
- Website: iui.rs/en/

The Belgrade Dance Institute (Институт за уметничку игру) is a private higher education institution for dance in Belgrade, Serbia, operating as a unit of the Faculty of Engineering Management, part of Union – Nikola Tesla University. Founded in 2014, it was the first higher education institution in Serbia to offer accredited study programmes in the field of dance; before that year no higher education in dance existed in the country, the Lujo Davičo Ballet School being the highest level available. It offers accredited programmes at bachelor's, master's and doctoral level.

== Academics ==
Undergraduate studies last three years (180 ECTS) and are organised across six departments: classical ballet, ballet pedagogy, contemporary dance, contemporary dance pedagogy, choreography, and stage folk dance and music. Graduates receive the title of Dramatic and Audiovisual Artist – Dance Arts.

Two master's programmes are offered, Artistic Dance and Dance Performance (IUI Transition Dance Company). Accredited doctoral studies in Artistic Dance and Performance were introduced in the 2019–20 academic year and last three years, leading to the title of Doctor of Arts.

Alongside practical training, the curriculum includes theoretical subjects in the aesthetics and psychology of art, compulsory English and an elective second foreign language, and courses in marketing, organisation and management in dance. Teaching staff are drawn from Serbia and from Trinity Laban Conservatoire of Music and Dance in London.

== Activities ==
Students of the Institute have presented work on the stages of the National Theatre in Belgrade; in March 2018 a programme of choreographic miniatures by third-year and master's students, created with the visiting choreographers Dagmar Dachauer, Maciej Kuźmiński and Ema Janković, was performed at the theatre's Raša Plaović Stage.

== See also ==
- National Theatre in Belgrade
- University of Arts in Belgrade
