= MozaIQ (magazine) =

- Editor-In-Chief: Nemanja M. Angelovski (2022-current)
- Former editors: Maja Šahbaz (2002–2008); Igor Jeremić (2008–2014); Tadija Miletić (2014–2022)
- Publisher: Mensa International
- First issue: April 1, 1998
- Country: Serbia
- Based in: Belgrade
- Language: Serbian
- Website: mozaiq.mensa.rs
- ISSN: 1820-385X

MozaIQ is the official magazine of the Serbian Mensa. It has been published continuously since its first issue in 1998 up to the 2019. It primarily contains articles about geography, history, science and world culture. The magazine was published bi-monthly, and occasionally with additional appendum was also included with printed Mensa documents. It is available only in online edition.

== History and profile ==
MozaIQ was established in 1998, as a bulletin for Mensa Yugoslavia organisation, covering only events and information's within Mensa. By 2004, default name "Mensa Yugoslavia bulletin" was changed into MozaIQ while Maja Šahbaz was editor in chief and during that time a number of popular scientific subject were published. In 2008, Igor Jeremić became editor in chief, who modernised the magazine, and improve it graphically. Playwright and director Tadija Miletić took the lead as editor in chief at the very end of 2014. Nemanja M. Angelovski succeeded him as new editor at the end of 2022.

== Administration ==
The current editor-in-chief of the MozaIQ Magazine is Nemanja M. Angelovski.

== See also ==
- Mensa International
