= Academy of Arts, Belgrade =

Higher education institution in Belgarde Serbia

Coordinates: 44.815°N 20.458°E

The Academy of Arts (Serbian: Академија уметности) is a private higher education institution in Belgrade, Serbia dedicated to the study of dramatic arts, including acting, production, and directing for theatre, film, and television. It was founded in 1994, by Aleksandar Pantelić, Velimir Abramović and Milan Đoković.
