= Battle of Dublje =

Battle of the Second Serbian Uprising

- Part of the Second Serbian Uprising
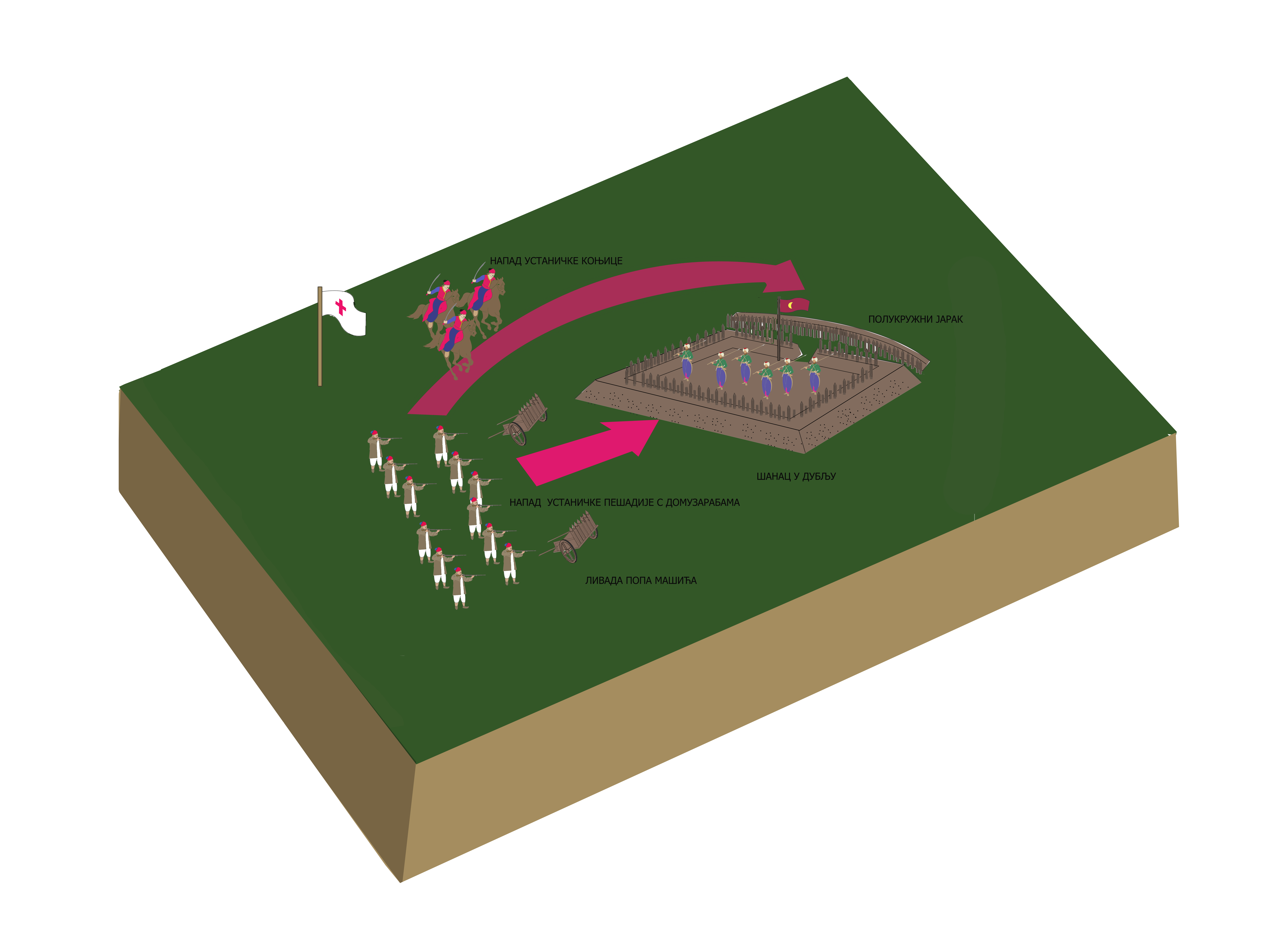
- Isometric map of the battle
Date	25–26 July 1815
Location	Dublje, Ottoman Empire (today Serbia)
Result	Serbian victory

Belligerents
Serbian rebels	Ottoman Empire

Commanders and leaders
Miloš Obrenović	Ibrahim Ali Pasha (POW)

Units involved
Combined nahija troops	Bosnia Eyalet; Nikšić nahiya

Strength
1,000	1,300

Casualties and losses
Minor	1,000+ killed, 80–83 captured

The Battle of Dublje (Serbian: Бој на Дубљу/Boj na Dublju) was undertaken by the Serbian rebel army led by Miloš Obrenović against Ottoman units of the Bosnia Eyalet at Dublje in Mačva in northwestern central Serbia, a frontier towards Bosnia, where a large army was mustered setting out to crush the rebellion. Miloš decided for an assault with shield-carriers that proved successful with minimal Serb losses and destruction of the Ottoman unit holed up in a moat fortification. It was the last conflict of the uprising, which ended with peace and Serbian autonomy.

== Background ==
=== Mačva ===
When the Second Serbian Uprising broke out in April 1815, the rebel exiles in Srem around Stojan Čupić sent a group, which included Sima Katić, into Mačva to rise the region. Stojan Čupić and Petar Nikolajević Moler met with the leader of the uprising, vojvoda Miloš Obrenović, at Valjevo. Miloš sent Čupić and Srdan to rise Mačva, and Moler and Jovica Milutinović with some Valjevo nahiya men to Crniljevo to watch if Ali Pasha of Zvornik would cross there. Sima Nenadović joined the men at Crniljevo after having secured the defense of the area towards Soko. Čupić was captured by Ottoman Bosnian troops below Badovinci in Mačva and killed in Zvornik. Srdan was unable to rise Mačva, until the death of Čupić. Archpriest Nikola Smiljanić met with Miloš in Čačak and was sent to Mačva where he was instrumental in rising up the region. Smiljanić was joined by Ilija Srdan, Banovac and Đuko Stojićević and they together took control of the Kitog road. Sima Katić first went to Šabac and fought there, then joined archpriest Smiljanić in the Kitog forest. Moler, Jovica, Gaja Dabić and Boja Bogićević gathered 1000 men and met with Marko Štitarac, Milutin Petrović, Bakal-Milosav and Uzun-Mirko with 1000 men, and together went to Klenje, arriving on 10 July [O.S. 28 June] 1815. The people of Mačva and Pocerina joined the rebels, meanwhile Rushid Hurshid Pasha mustered a large army in Bosnia.

=== Prelude ===
Hurshid Pasha and Ibrahim Ali Pasha of Nikšić attacked Mačva and Pocerina from the Drina. The rebel leadership believed that Hurshid Pasha and Ali Pasha of Zvornik would attack via the Cer mountain and end up in Šabac, and thus left small units in Kitog and most of the army below the Cer between Radovašnica and Petkovica. Large numbers of Ottoman troops crossed into Serbia from Bosnia upon this, with Hurshid Pasha camped at Beljin and towards Badovinci, and a contingent sent ahead of him under Ibrahim Ali Pasha of Nikšić that crossed at Janj and arrived at Lešnica with 1000 Bosnian troops and 300 Nikšić troops. Ibrahim figured that the Serbian rebels were below the Cer and went to Dublje, where he forced captured Mačva Serbs to build and fortify a large moat. After dealing with Karanovac, Miloš gathered Rudnik, Valjevo and Kragujevac nahiya rebels and went to Tamnava, followed by his brother Jovan Obrenović, Sima Paštrmac, Milić Drinčić and Milentije Pavlović, and made orders on how to counter Ali Pasha of Zvornik in Podrinje. On 25 July [O.S. 13 July] 1815 the rebel troops under Miloš Obrenović gathered at Lipolist, and part of the army, under Moler and Jovan Obrenović, went in the heavy rain for Dublje and gathered Smiljanić, Nikola Katić with 20 men, and Sima Katić with 100 bećari. Moler suggested to Miloš for an assault on 25 July [O.S. 13 July] 1815 but he postponed to the next day.

== History ==
Dublje was located on the main road from Bosnia to Šabac and Belgrade, which was why Miloš decided to attack, and the rebels also needed another victory to show that they were powerful and determined. Smiljanić and Sima Katić were well-informed on the Dublje area and Ibrahim's positioning, and the rebels took detours to suddenly assault and force the Ottoman soldiers into the moat, killing and dispersing some. The rebels set sheds on fire and gained valuable booty. An intense gun fight ensued and in the night the Serbian cavalry in the distance feared that the attack would fail and went to Jezero, but quickly returned as it was concluded that the infantry fusillade checked the moat. Đuka Stojićević was wounded in this initial assault. Early in the next day, 26 July [O.S. 14 July] 1815, Miloš Obrenović arrived outside Dublje with the rest of the main army (including Milić Drinčić and Sima Nenadović) and suggested to the pressured Ottomans to surrender, which they refused. Miloš planned for a violent assault using large shield-carriers (known as domuz-araba, as used at Palež), then at midday rode with his flag-bearer Paštrmac and a couple of bodyguards around the moat and informed the Serb units on the attack, shot a couple of bullets at the moat, then signaled for a simultaneous attack.

The field was engulfed with shots and the shield-carriers advanced towards the moat, followed by large numbers of infantry, with some irregular columns in the first line being deterred and pushed back, but were reinforced by subsequent lines and continued the assault. Serb generals ran ahead of the infantry and boosted morale, and stopped men from leaving. Milić Drinčić commanded a detachment that was to take the trench of Ibrahim Ali Pasha. The Rudnik nahiya rebels seem to have been the bulk of assaulters, while the Valjevo nahiya rebels entered in the later stage. Sima Nenadović rode in front of the moat on a young horse and yelled "Forward brothers, for the Honorable Cross and Christian Faith!". There was continuous gunfire, with the most daring Serbs standing at the end of the moat and shooting and killing many of the defending Ottoman troops, and screams of agony and for help were heard. The daring Teša Podrug, Petar Čarko, Boško Šarić and some others climbed the moat and entered the battlement and moat fortification. There was close combat with yatagans inside the fortification, with Serbs attacking from all sides, which put panic in the Ottoman troops. More Serbian troops entered the moat and the screams and howling intensified. Some Ottoman soldiers tried to jump the parapet and run for safety but were cut down. The main Ottoman troops went for the gate where Milić Drinčić's men awaited and fought them, cutting them down one by one into piles. Soon the gunfire calmed down and some Ottomans managed into the shrubs around the moat, where the battle continued for a short time. Only a small number of captives were taken to the generals and Miloš.

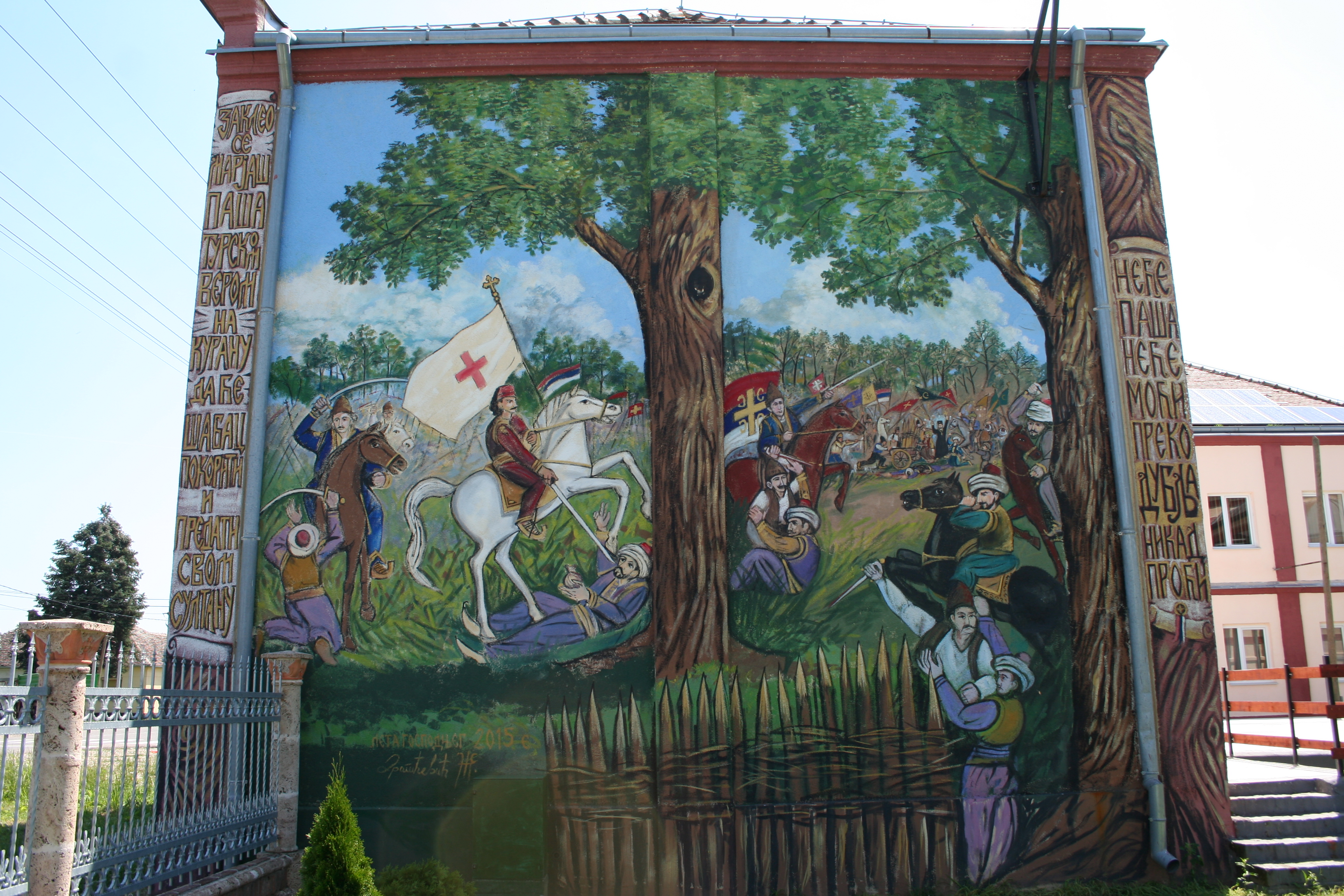
Mural depicting the battle, by the monument in the courtyard of the Dublje church.

Among the captives were Ibrahim Ali Pasha, the commander himself, captured by Teša Podrug, the Čaraković brothers and Ilija Koreniti, which greatly rejoiced Miloš. He had been found in the shrubs barefoot brandishing a sabre, but he immediately surrendered. Out of 1,300 Ottomans, 80 or 83 were caught and handed over to Miloš, while only a small number managed to their horses and across the Drina, most of them were killed. All of the Nikšić Turks were killed according to K. Nenadović. Arriving at the tent of Miloš, Ibrahim saw the severed head of his youngest son, Osman, killed by Skerla from Lipovac in Kragujevačka Jasenica, while his other son was caught alive. All of Ibrahim's belongings were returned to him. The Serbs had minor losses, however, they lost two important commanders in Milić Drinčić who was shot in the nape by the gates, and young Sima Nenadović who assaulted the moat. Drinčić likely died from friendly fire, although there are conspiracy theories regarding his death. Milutin Savić and Cincar-Marko, both distinguished throughout the second uprising, were wounded.

== Legacy ==
The rebels gained significant booty such as superb weaponry, equipment and noble horses. Miloš took Ibrahim with him to Crniljevo where they talked in the days following the battle, discussing the cause of the uprising, which Ibrahim understood, and promised he would not raise hands against the Serbs, but also suggested that Miloš negotiate and put himself under the emperor, and not any foreign power. Ibrahim was then released. Dublje was the last of the conflicts of the uprising. At Ćuprija, the Serbs and Vizier Marashli Ali Pasha signed a peace treaty.

The church in Dublje was founded on the 120-year anniversary of the battle. In 2015, there was a 200-year anniversary in Dublje with army representatives and liturgy. There is an annual cultural manifestation in Bogatić named Boj na Dublju. There is a monument to the battle in the courtyard of the Dublje church.

== See also ==
- Timeline of the Serbian Revolution
- Serbian Army (revolutionary)
- List of Serbian Revolutionaries

== Annotations ==
1. Also known as Marjaš and Maraš, not to be confused with Marashli Ali Pasha.
2. T. Vukosavljević (1988) concluded that the Serbian rebels had 50 dead. K. Protić described the Serbian losses as minor and "insignificant". K. Nenadović claimed 15 dead, out of which three were commanders.

== Sources ==
- Grčić, Ljiljana (2009). "Историјски споменици у Мачви, шабачкој Посавини и Поцерини у функцији развоју туризма" (PDF). Глобус. 34. SGD.
- Milićević, Milan Đ. (1888). Поменик знаменитих људи у српског народа новијега доба [Memory Book]. Издање Чупићеве задужбине – via Archive.org.
- Nenadović, Konstantin N. (1884). Живот и дела великог Ђорђа Петровића Кара-Ђорђа [Life and Deeds of Great Đorđe Petrović Kara-Đorđe]. Vol. II (1 ed.). Vienna: У Штампарији Јована Н. Вернаја – via Google Books.
- Nenadović, Konstantin N. (1903) [1883]. Живот и дела великог Ђорђа Петровића Кара-Ђорђа [Life and Deeds of Great Đorđe Petrović Kara-Đorđe]. Vol. I (2 ed.). Belgrade: Штампа Савића и Комп. – via Archive.org.
- Protić, Kosta (1891). "Ратни догађаји из другог српског устанка, год. 1815". Годишњица Николе Чупића. XXXI. Državna štamparija: 1–104 – via Google Books.
- Vukosavljević, Teodosije (1988). "Милић Дринчић - војвода подгорски" [Milić Drinčić - Voïvode de Podgora]. Zbornik. XVIII: 143–180.
