= Sima Katić =

Serbian commander

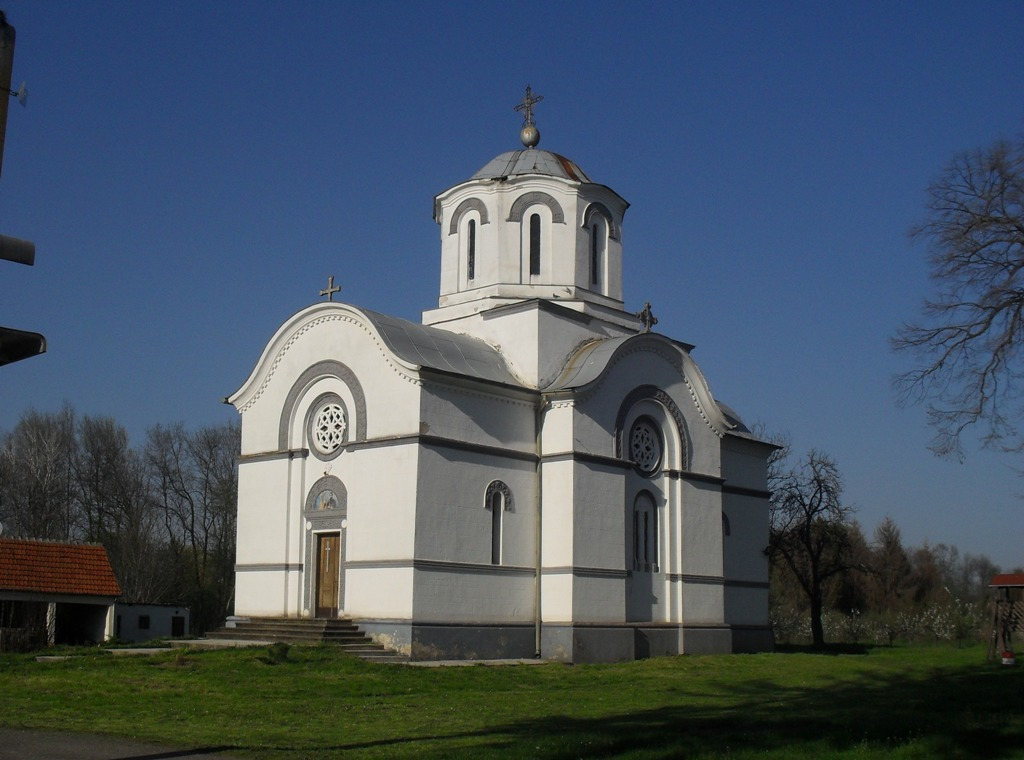
- The Glogovac church, to which Katić was ktetor (founding donator)
- Born: 1783; Dvorovi, Ottoman Empire
- Died: 1832 (aged 48–49)
- Military career
- Allegiance: Revolutionary Serbia
- Service years: 1804–1815
- Rank: bimbaša (1808) buljubaša (1806)
- Nickname: Prekodrinac
- Unit: Mačva
- Commands: Mačva, Drina
- Conflicts: First Serbian Uprising (1804–13)

Sima Katić (Serbian: Сима Катић; 1783–1832) was a Serbian revolutionary, a captain active in the First Serbian Uprising leading a unit made up of Bosnian Serbs in the Mačva region by the Drina river. He was under the command of general Stojan Čupić.

== Early life ==
Katić was born in 1783 in Dvorovi by the Drina river in the Bosnia region, then part of the Sanjak of Zvornik. He moved with his family to the village of Glogovac in the Mačva region of Serbia during the uprising and battles around the Drina. He was unrelated to the Katić family of Rogača. He received the nickname Prekodrinac (Прекодринац, "from over the Drina").

== Uprising ==
Sima Katić with a couple of friends, joined the unit of Stojan Čupić, who in 1805 assembled his own band which closed off roads in Mačva by the Drina, and dug trenches from Zasavica to the Sava – from where they attacked Ottoman Bosnian troops crossing the Drina. Stojan Čupić quickly became a local hero, feared by the "Turks". Katić was promoted by Čupić to buljubaša (captain) and he had responsibility of the upper Drina confluence to the mouth of the Žiča stream into the Drina. Another of Čupić's captains was Zeka Buljubaša. Katić's unit intercepted many Ottoman Bosnian bands raiding in Mačva in 1806–08, due to which he was elevated to bimbaša (in 1807), owing to his heroism and loyalty. He commanded a trench at Zasavica and his cheta (band) included Bosnian Serb immigrants. Zeka's and Katić's bands were known as bećari (bachelors) and golaći (nakeds), made up of bachelors without houses or families, at first "naked" (badly equipped), and although the name implied poverty, the soldiers were richly dressed and armed. Katić distinguished himself in battles at Salaš, Golo Brdo, Žiča and Runjani. His band destroyed an Ottoman Bosnian unit of 200 raiding at Badovinci. Another Bosnian unit raided Prnjavor, Ilija Srdan's village, and Katić destroyed it, gaining superb uniforms and weaponry.

In 1812 and 1813, supreme leader Karađorđe called him vojvoda (general) and put him in command of immigrants to Mačva (a frontier) and building trenches. He thus became independent from Čupić's command. Katić participated at the disastrous Battle of Ravnje (August 1813) which saw the suppression of the uprising and rebel exile. With Čupić, he escaped to Srem.

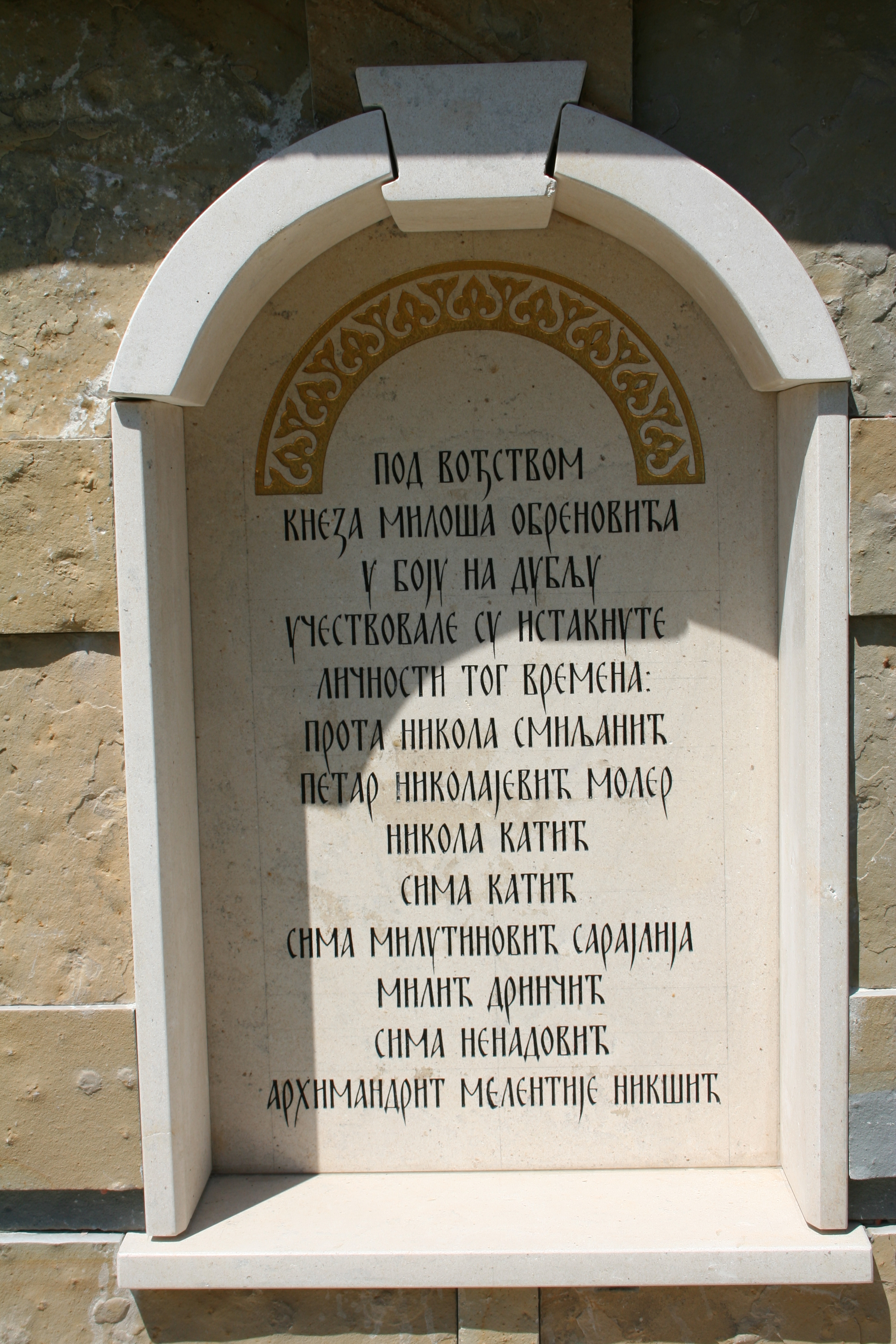
Sima Katić's name included on the monument at the Dublje church.

When the Second Serbian Uprising broke out in April 1815, the rebel exiles in Srem around Čupić sent a group into Mačva to rise the region. The group included Katić with a couple of men, Krsto Prekodrinac and Pantelija "Panta" Jovanović from Banovo Polje, Petar Jolo "Šabčanin" from Tabanović, and all of Srdan's men and friends. In Mačva, Katić organized rebellion with archpriest Nikola Smiljanić, Marko Štitarac and Ilija Srdan. Katić went to Šabac and fought there, then joined archpriest Smiljanić in Kitog. The rebel troops under the leader of the uprising, vojvoda Miloš Obrenović, gathered at Lipolist, and part of the army, under Moler and Jovan Obrenović, went for Dublje and gathered Smiljanić, Nikola Katić with 20 men, and Sima Katić with 100 bećari. They participated in the defeat of Marashli Ali Pasha at Dublje (July 1815). After the succession of the uprising, Prince Miloš Obrenović appointed Štitarac as governor of Mačva and Pocerina, and Katić his assistant. He was in the local administration until his death in 1832 in Glogovac. He was the ktetor (donator) of the Glogovac church.

Katić was described as heroic and beloved by the Mačvans, physically as of mid-height, dark-haired, with long thick moustache and generally as good-looking.

== See also ==
- List of Serbian Revolutionaries
- Timeline of the Serbian Revolution
- Serbian Army (revolutionary)

== Sources ==
- Gavrilović, Andra (1904). Црте из историје ослобођења Србије [Drawings of History of the Liberation of Serbia]. Belgrade: Нздање дворске књпжаре Мите Стајића у Београду. pp. 110–115 – via Archive.org.
- Milićević, Milan Đ. (1888). Поменик знаменитих људи у српског народа новијега доба [Memory Book]. Издање Чупићеве задужбине – via Archive.org.
- Nenadović, Konstantin N. (1884). Живот и дела великог Ђорђа Петровића Кара-Ђорђа [Life and Deeds of Great Đorđe Petrović Kara-Đorđe]. Vol. II (1 ed.). Vienna: У Штампарији Јована Н. Вернаја – via Google Books.
- Nenadović, Konstantin N. (1903) [1883]. Живот и дела великог Ђорђа Петровића Кара-Ђорђа [Life and Deeds of Great Đorđe Petrović Kara-Đorđe]. Vol. I (2 ed.). Belgrade: Штампа Савића и Комп. – via Archive.org.
- Protić, Kosta (1891). "Ратни догађаји из другог српског устанка, год. 1815". Годишњица Николе Чупића. XXXI. Državna štamparija: 1–104 – via Google Books.
