= Sima Nenadović =

Serbian revolutionary leader

Sima Nenadović Сима Ненадовић
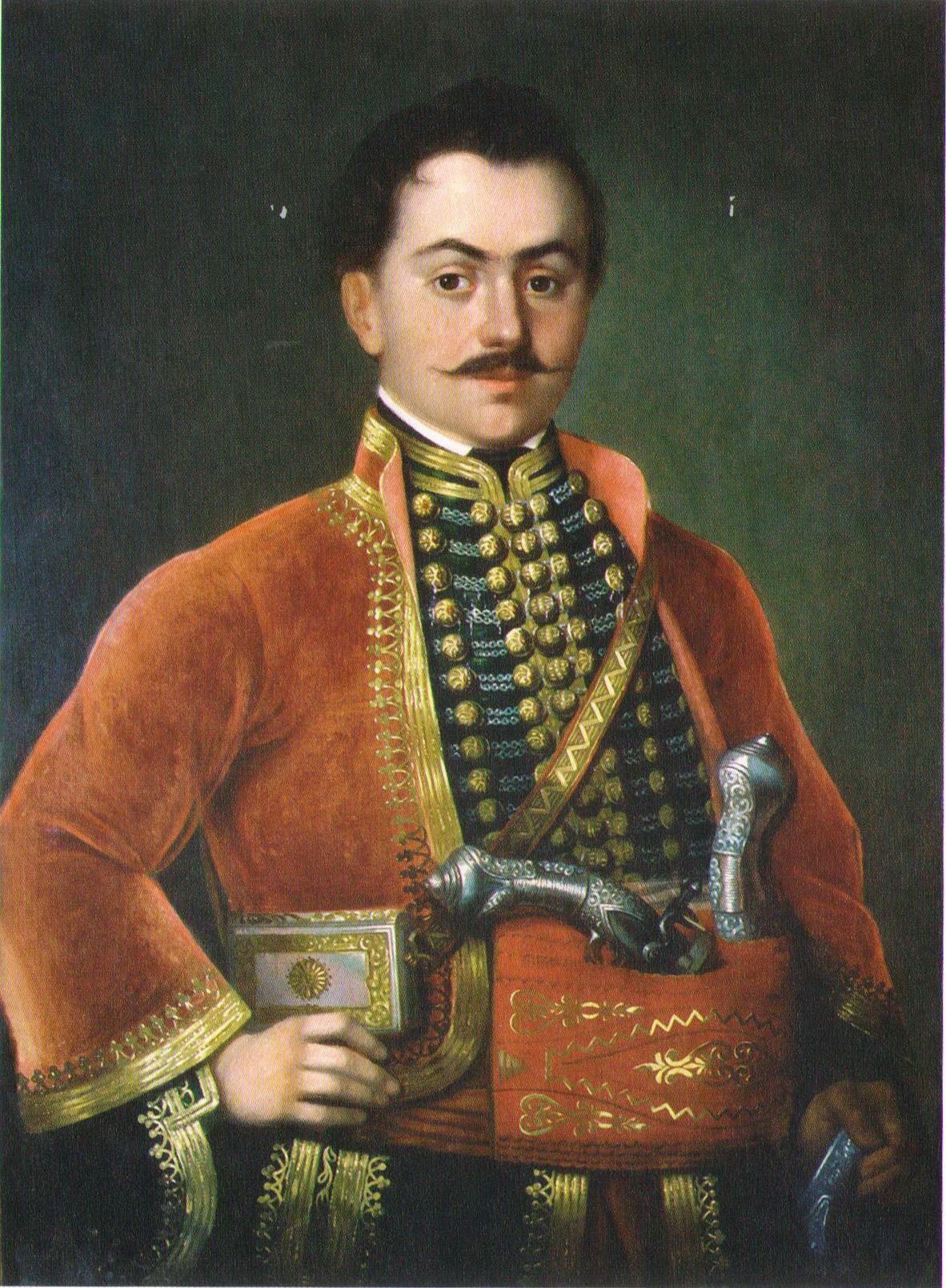
- Portrait of Nenadović by Uroš Knežević, 1850
- Born: 1793; Brankovina (modern Serbia)
- Died: 26 July 1815 (22 years old); Dublje
- Military career
- Allegiance: (Serbia) Serbian revolutionaries
- Service years: 1813–1815
- Rank: Vojvoda
- Nickname: Sima
- Unit: Valjevo nahija
- Conflicts: First Serbian Uprising (1813); Second Serbian Uprising (1815)

Simeon "Sima" Nenadović (Serbian Cyrillic: Сима Ненадовић; 1793 – 1815) was a Serbian voivode (military commander) in the Second Serbian Uprising of the Serbian revolution. He was part of the Nenadović family, among which was his brother Prota Mateja, the first Serbian Prime Minister, his father Aleksa Nenadović (1749–1804), his nephew Ljubomir Nenadović, and his uncle Jakov Nenadović.

== Life ==
Simeon Nenadović "Sima" was born in 1793, in Brankovina. His father was knez Aleksa Nenadović, and his mother's name was Jovanka. The renegade janissaries, known as dahia, took control of the Smederevan Sanjak in 1802, after murdering Vizier Hadži Mustafa Pasha. The four leaders divided the Sanjak, ruling as dictators, also removing the rights granted by Sultan Selim III. In 1804, the janissaries executed more than 70 prominent Serb nobles, among which were Aleksa (Sima's father), and Ilija Birčanin. Sima finished the Velika škola of Ivan Jugović in Belgrade, and military school in Vienna.

The slaughter of the dukes triggered the First Serbian Uprising. Karadjordje was elected as leader. Sima's uncle, Jakov Nenadović, was one of the most distinguished revolutionary commanders, and the first Serbian Minister of Interior (1811–1813). His older brother, Mateja, known as Prota Mateja, was an Orthodox archpriest and the first Serbian Prime Minister.

Sima did only participate in the last year of the Uprising, in the battles on the Drina (1813). With the suppression of the revolt by the Ottomans, Sima fled Serbia and helped his brother Mateja in his diplomatic missions (1814–15). He returned to Serbia, immediately with the outbreak of the Second Serbian Uprising (1815). He became a voivode of the Valjevo nahija. He died in combat against the Ottomans at Dublje, during the Battle of Dublje on 26 July 1815, at the age of 22.

== See also ==
- List of Serbian Revolutionaries

== Sources ==
- Milićević, Milan (1888). Поменик знаменитих људи у српскога народа новијега доба. Srpska kraljevska štamparija. pp. 412–414. (Public Domain)
- Velibor Berko Savić, Nenadovići, Valjevo 2004

Military offices
Vacant Suppression of uprising Title last held by Jevrem Nenadović	vojvoda of Valjevo nahija 1815	Office abolished
