= Bakal-Milosav =

Serbian revolutionary

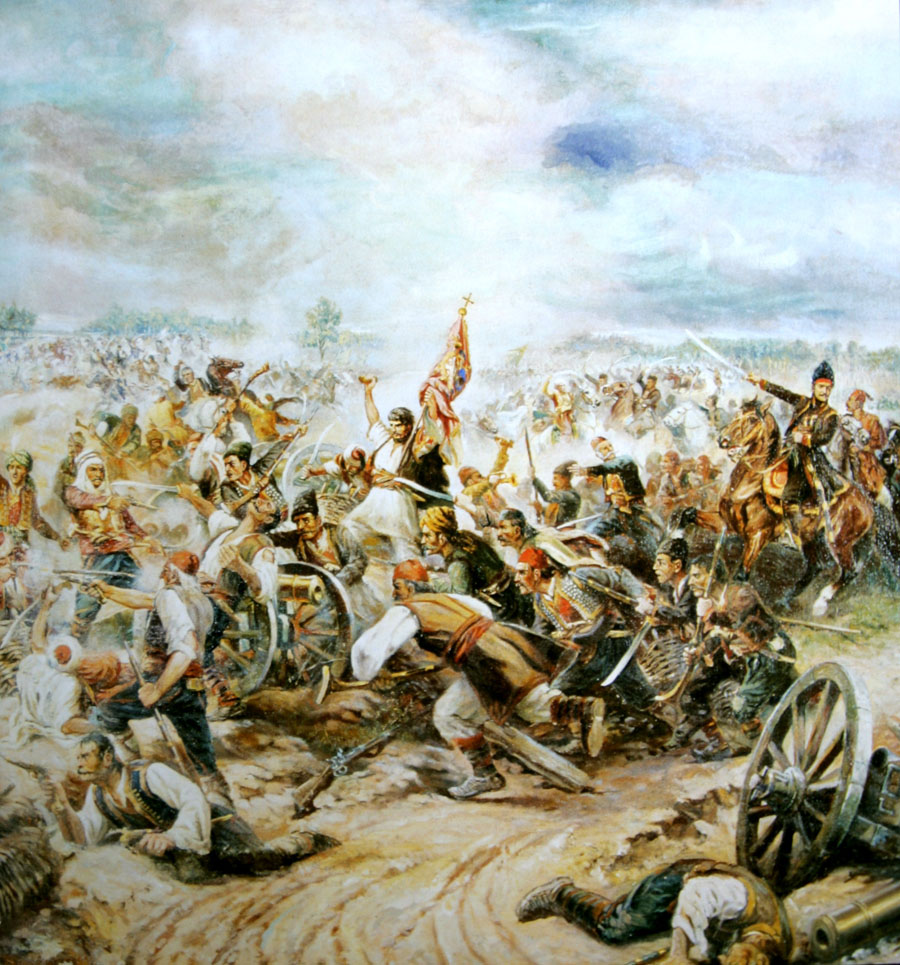
- Bakal-Milosav distinguished himself at Mišar (battle illustrated)
- Born: 1770; Sanjak of Herzegovina, Ottoman Empire
- Died: 1823 (aged 52–53); Šabac, Principality of Serbia (now Serbia)
- Burial place: Šabac
- Military career
- Allegiance: Revolutionary Serbia
- Service years: 1804–1815
- Rank: kapetan (captain)
- Nicknames: Bakal-Milosav ("Milosav the Grocer")
- Unit: Šabac nahija army under Luka Lazarević
- Commands: Drina
- Known for: Heroism
- Conflicts: First Serbian Uprising: Battle of Mišar; Battle of Loznica

Bakal-Milosav (Serbian: Бакал-Милосав; 1770–1823) was a Serb revolutionary, originally an immigrant grocery store owner who volunteered to join the Serbian rebel army in the First Serbian Uprising and fought mostly under the command of Luka Lazarević. His unit fought in West Serbia and by the Drina against the Ottoman Bosnian army, where he distinguished himself.

== Life ==
Milosav was born in the Sanjak of Herzegovina, from where he moved to Šabac in c. 1800. He learnt the Turkish language. At Šabac, he set up a grocery store (Turkish: bakkal), for which he was known as "Bakal-Milosav".

When the uprising against the Dahije began and Valjevo nahiya rebel leader Jakov Nenadović besieged Šabac, Bakal-Milosav's store burnt down and he joined Nenadović's troops as a volunteer. After the signing of peace treaty with the Šabac Turks, Bakal-Milosav continued to serve in the rebel army, joining priest Luka Lazarević's unit. He assembled a band (četa) of volunteers. Since then, he mostly fought under and accompanied Luka in the most daring operations. He distinguished himself in battles, especially around Šabac, Valjevo, Podrinje, and Užice. At Lešnica, Bakal-Milosav constructed a trench in the plain from where he defended the area from Ottoman Bosnian incursions.

From 1805, when the rebels fought for liberation against the Ottoman Empire, Luka Lazarević led several important victories. On 18 January [O.S. 6 January] 1806 Jakov Nenadović and Luka Lazarević began the siege of Šabac, while Karađorđe set off from Belgrade to join them; on the way supreme leader Karađorđe learnt that Ottoman Bosnian troops were about to cross the Drina and thus immediately dispatched Luka. Arriving at Lešnica on 29 January [O.S. 17 January] 1806 with Živko Dabić, Luka's unit defeated the Turks at the Ranitovača forest after a day of fighting, with much of enemy troops drowning in the Jadar river. By the Jadar, Bakal-Milosav pierced three swimming Bosnian soldiers with spears.

Bakal-Milosav participated at the important Battle of Mišar (August 1806), fighting against the large Ottoman Bosnian unit under the command of Mehmed-beg Kulenović "Kulin-kapetan". He reportedly "chopped and restrained Turks as though they were reed and wouldn't tire even when his horse stopped". In the midst of battle, Luka challenged Kulin-kapetan to a duel; Luka's men shot and killed Kulin-kapetan in a pre-set ambush. For his personal courage at the battle, Karađorđe elevated him to kapetan (captain) of his own band.

For the remainder of the first uprising, Bakal-Milosav fought by the Drina and crossed into Bosnia several times. He fought at Loznica in 1808 against the Ottoman Bosnian army. In October 1810, the Ottoman Bosnian army besieged Loznica, which was defended in the trenches by Miloš Pocerac, Anta Bogićević and Bakal-Milosav. Karađorđe, Jakov and Luka and other generals came to the rescue and lifted the siege and destroyed the Ottoman Bosnian army. The battle of Loznica and Bakal-Milosav entered epic poetry, performed by Filip Višnjić. Bakal-Milosav appeared at the lower gate on horseback and untiredly cut down many enemy soldiers, dispersing them, and when his horse was too tired, he took another one and continued fighting. At Novo Selo, the Ottoman Bosnian commander Pejzo Mehmed-aga called Luka to duel, but Bakal-Milosav took his place as he cared for and feared Luka would die. In the duel, on horseback, Pejzo fell Bakal-Milosav's horse and was about to cut him down, when Luka shot and killed him with his flintlock musket.

With the Ottoman suppression of the uprising in 1813, Bakal-Milosav either crossed into Austrian-held Srem, or stayed in the mountains as a hajduk (brigand). In 1815, he returned and joined the Second Serbian Uprising under knez and vojvoda Miloš Obrenović, and rose the people in Mačva. Bakal-Milosav was among the commanders that assembled at Klenje on 10 July [O.S. 28 June] 1815. He participated at the Battle of Dublje. Following the peace talks between Miloš and Marashli Pasha, Bakal-Milosav was sent to Constantinople to as his special diplomat (tatarin) as he spoke excellent Turkish, to confirm peace. In 1818, Bakal-Milosav was again sent to Constantinople where he managed to free 70 of the prisoners-of-war, captured with vojvoda Janko Stojićević at Lešnica in 1813. There were 300 prisoners-of-war at first, but most had died by the time Bakal-Milosav had them freed. Prince Miloš offered Bakal-Milosav to work in the government several times but he refused, as he liked to live a life of freedom. He received gifts and pension from Miloš. He was known in his area for settling disputes, complicated trade bills, and energetically sought for respect and unity among locals.

He died in 1823, at 53 years of age. He had a son, Đoka, who was an officer (kaplar) in the Serbian army.

Bakal-Milosav was described as tall and shapely, dark-haired, light-skinned, of good character and sociable, and a great hero. He was especially famed for his participation at Mišar and Loznica.

== See also ==
- List of people of the First Serbian Uprising
- List of people of the Second Serbian Uprising

== Annotations ==
1. According to historian Stojan Obradović (1817–1879), Bakal-Milosav was born in Mostar, while another version has his birth place somewhere in the Rudnik nahiya. M. Milićević and K. Nenadović both said he was born in Herzegovina, without an exact location.

== Sources ==
- Milićević, Milan Đ. (1888). Поменик знаменитих људи у српског народа новијега доба. Издање Чупићеве задужбине – via Archive.org.
- Nenadović, Konstantin N. (1903) [1883]. Живот и дела великог Ђорђа Петровића Кара-Ђорђа. Vol. I (2 ed.). Belgrade: Штампа Савића и Комп. – via Archive.org.
- Nenadović, Konstantin N. (1884). Живот и дела великог Ђорђа Петровића Кара-Ђорђа. Vol. II (1 ed.). Vienna: У Штампарији Јована Н. Вернаја – via Google Books.
- Obradović, Stojan (1873). Живот и радња заслужних Срба из окружија шабачког и подринског у књажеству Србији у устанцима противу насиља турског од 1804. и 1815. године: у два одељка. Stefanović.
- Protić, Kosta (1891). "Ратни догађаји из другог српског устанка, год. 1815". Годишњица Николе Чупића. XXXI. Državna štamparija: 1–104 – via Google Books.
