= Ibrahim Ali Pasha of Nikšić =

- Born: Ibrahim Ali; 17XX; Nikšić, Sanjak of Herzegovina
- Died: 18XX
- Children: Osman-beg †
- Military career
- Allegiance: Ottoman Empire
- Rank: kethüda
- Nicknames: Marash Pasha, Ikituğlu
- Conflicts: Second Serbian Uprising (POW)

Ibrahim Ali Pasha, also known as Marash Pasha, was an Ottoman commander from the Nikšić nahiya who participated in the Second Serbian Uprising (1815) as a vanguard to Bosnian Vizier Hurshid Pasha.

== Origin ==
Ibrahim hailed from Nikšić nahiya (known in Serbian as Nikšićka župa), an area inhabited at the time by a majority of Serbian-speaking Muslims. The Nikšić "Turks" were known for their bravery and conflict with the neighbouring Old Montenegro. Prior to the uprising, Ibrahim was in some kind of trouble in Mostar. He wore a very long beard.

== Uprising ==
When the Second Serbian Uprising broke out in April 1815, Ibrahim Ali Pasha was under the command of Bosnian Vizier Hurshid Pasha. Hurshid Pasha received orders to quell the uprising and Ibrahim Ali was part of the vanguard of the Bosnia Eyalet army. He had under his command 300 Nikšić Turks. Hurshid Pasha and Ibrahim Ali Pasha of Nikšić attacked Mačva and Pocerina from the Drina. Rebel leader Stojan Čupić was deceived by some Mačva serfs and captured by Ibrahim Ali, then sent to Zvornik where he eventually was killed.

The Serbian rebel leadership believed that Hurshid Pasha and Ali Pasha of Zvornik would attack via the Cer mountain and end up in Šabac, and thus left small units in Kitog and most of the army below the Cer. Large numbers of Ottoman troops crossed into Serbia from Bosnia upon this, with Hurshid Pasha camped at Beljin and towards Badovinci, and a contingent sent ahead of him under Ibrahim Ali Pasha of Nikšić that crossed at Janj and arrived at Lešnica with 1000 Bosnian troops and 300 Nikšić troops. Ibrahim figured that the Serbian rebels were below the Cer and went to Dublje, where he forced captured Mačva Serbs to build and fortify a large moat. The Serbian rebels assaulted Dublje on 26 July [O.S. 14 July] 1815 and destroyed the Ottoman unit of Ibrahim Ali, also managing to capture him. Arriving at the tent of Miloš Obrenović, Ibrahim saw the severed head of his youngest son, Osman, while another son was caught alive. Miloš treated him with respect, gave back his weaponry and uniform, became pobratim (Balkan blood-brother) and eventually released him.

Miloš took Ibrahim with him to Crniljevo where they talked in the days following the battle, discussing the cause of the uprising, which Ibrahim understood, and promised he would not raise hands against the Serbs, but also suggested that Miloš negotiate and put himself under the emperor, and not any foreign power. Ibrahim was then released.

== Annotations ==
1. There are different versions of his name. Sarajlija (1826) named him Maraš-Ali-Ibrajim-paša. Vuk Karadžić named him Ali-paša Nikšićki. K. Nenadović (1884) named him Maraš-Ali-Paša Ićituglija Nikšićanin or Paša-Maraš. M. Milićević (1888) named him Ali-Paša-Maraš in the capture of Čupić (1888), and Ibrahim-paša Maraš in the battle (1876). Protić (1891) named him Maraš-Ali-Paša from Nikšić. Milutinović (1897) called him Marjaš-paša from Nikšić. Teodosije Vukosavljević (1988) named him Ibrahim Ali-paša Nikšićki. Ikituğlu means "two-tug", as per status.

== Sources ==
- Milićević, Milan Đ. (1888). Поменик знаменитих људи у српског народа новијега доба [Memory Book]. Издање Чупићеве задужбине – via Archive.org.
- Milutinović, Dragutin S. (1897). "Komentar na Bitka na Dublju". Brankovo kolo za zabavu, pouku i književnost: 848–854.
- Nenadović, Konstantin N. (1884). Живот и дела великог Ђорђа Петровића Кара-Ђорђа [Life and Deeds of Great Đorđe Petrović Kara-Đorđe]. Vol. II (1 ed.). Vienna: У Штампарији Јована Н. Вернаја – via Google Books.
- Nenadović, Konstantin N. (1903) [1883]. Живот и дела великог Ђорђа Петровића Кара-Ђорђа [Life and Deeds of Great Đorđe Petrović Kara-Đorđe]. Vol. I (2 ed.). Belgrade: Штампа Савића и Комп. – via Archive.org.
- Protić, Kosta (1891). "Ратни догађаји из другог српског устанка, год. 1815". Годишњица Николе Чупића. XXXI. Državna štamparija: 1–104 – via Google Books.
- Vukosavljević, Teodosije (1988). "Милић Дринчић - војвода подгорски" [Milić Drinčić - Voïvode de Podgora]. Zbornik. XVIII: 143–180.
