= Stojan Čupić =

Serbian revolutionary general

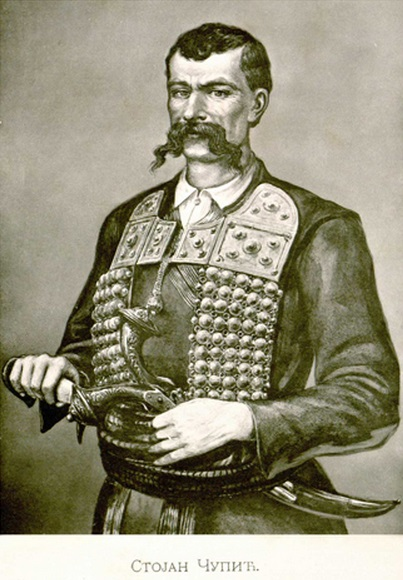
- Lithograph
- Born: ca. 1765; Piva, Sanjak of Herzegovina (modern Montenegro)
- Died: 1815 (aged 49–50); Zvornik, Sanjak of Zvornik (modern Bosnia and Herzegovina)
- Military career
- Allegiance: Serbian Revolutionaries (1804–15)
- Service years: 1804–1815
- Rank: vojvoda (general)
- Nickname: "the Dragon of Noćaj" (Zmaj od Noćaja)
- Unit: Mačva
- Conflicts: First Serbian Uprising (1804–13); Hadži Prodan's Revolt (1814); Second Serbian Uprising (1815)

Stojan Čupić (pronounced [stɔ̌jan tʃûpitɕ], Serbian Cyrillic: Стојан Чупић; ca. 1765 – 1815) was a Serbian revolutionary general (vojvoda), one of the most important commanders of the First Serbian Uprising. He was active in the Mačva region.

== Early life ==
Born in Piva, in the Sanjak of Herzegovina (now in Montenegro), his original surname was Dobrilović (Добриловић). He was brought up in Salaš Crnobarski (at that time known as Ali-Agin Salaš) in Mačva in the Sanjak of Smederevo (now in Serbia), where he was schooled. He lived with his grandfather, Todor "Toda", his parents being dead. His grandfather was a chieftain in his home village, but moved for an unknown reason to Serbia, leaving his sons back home. The sons died, so Stojan and his three older sisters went to live with grandfather Toda. Strahinja Čupić, a rich man without children from Salaš Noćajski, adopted Stojan when he was a boy, and brought him up "as though he was of his own blood". His adoptive father found a girl for him, and he married, so that he could inherit. Stojan worked in trade.

== First Serbian Uprising ==
Stojan Čupić first met Karađorđe, a pig trader and Austrian veteran, somewhere in the Valjevo nahija in 1804. In 1805, Stojan began assembling his own band (among whom were Zeka Buljubaša), which closed off roads in Mačva by the Drina river, and dug trenches from Zasavica to the Sava – from where he attacked Turks crossing the Drina. Stojan Čupić quickly became a local hero, feared by the Turks.

At the end of July 1806, the Vizier with 45,000 soldiers dispatched from Šabac heading for Belgrade. At the same time, Karađorđe had left the Morava with 8–9,000 soldiers and awaited the Ottoman forces on the field of Mišar. The Serb rebels defeated the Ottomans in the battle at Mišar; the decimated Ottoman troops were forced to retreat to Šabac, from where they would leave for Bosnia. Čupić, who participated in the battle, hurried to Mačva to intercept the fleeing Ottoman troops; near Drenovac he cut down the Mula of Sarajevo. Under his command was Sima Katić, whose unit intercepted many Ottoman Bosnian bands raiding in Mačva in 1806–08, due to which he was elevated to bimbaša.

Along with Karađorđe and other notable commanders, he participated in the bloody Battle of Loznica (1810), which left many Turks dead. He was wounded during the battle, but still managed to save Cincar-Janko's life, about to be slain by an armored Turk soldier.

At the beginning of September 1813 the Serbian rebels were defeated at Ravnje by a strong Ottoman force commanded by French officers. The rebels were forced to retreat; Čupić swam over the Zasavica and arrived at Šabac, where he together with his blood brother, vojvoda Luka Lazarević, started organizing the defense of the city. When the Ottomans assembled a very large force outside the city, the rebel soldiers run asunder, leaving the commanders, who concluded that it was impossible to defend the city. Luka Lazarević sent his family to Syrmia, while he, Čupić, and their men descended the Sava to Zabrežje, from where they crossed the Sava into Austrian territory (Military Frontier), in order to save their lives. As other commanders, he found refuge in Syrmia. However, after a short period of time, he returned to Mačva, staying in the forests.

== Second Serbian Uprising ==
When the Second Serbian Uprising broke out in April 1815, the rebel exiles in Srem around Čupić sent a group into Mačva to rise the region. The group included Katić with a couple of men, Krsto Prekodrinac and Pantelija "Panta" Jovanović from Banovo Polje, Petar Jolo "Šabčanin" from Tabanović, and all of Ilija Srdan's men and friends.

There are several stories about his death:

- Ahead of the Second Serbian Uprising (1815), Čupić had returned to Serbia and raised the people against the Turks; according to Konstantin Nenadović he came into conflict with vojvoda Miloš Obrenović; Obrenović ordered that he be betrayed to the Turks, who then murdered him.
- According to Milan Milićević, he met with Obrenović, who then had him sent to rise up Mačva. Some serfs and others in Mačva (listed by Milićević) were not ready to break the peace, thus conspired against Čupić, whom they thought was the only one planning to raise a rebellion. They contacted the Turks in Bosnia and promised his head. "Ali-Paša-Maraš" and his men waited in ambush at the given place, where the serfs took him, having told him that they would meet up with an ammunition dealer who he knew. He was taken to Vizier Rushid Pasha, where he was nicely received, then sent to Zvornik. There, he was thrown into jail bound in cuffs. He died after a month. A Dimitrije Nogić learned of the conspiracy and killed several of the serfs.

== Aftermath ==
Obrenović became the supreme leader of the Second Serbian Uprising. Čupić left a son, Toma, and two daughters, Vasilija and Tomanija "Toka", after him. His son had seven children, all of whom died before him. The daughters married in Šabac. According to Konstantin Nenadović, contemporary authors, such as Moler, Radič and Cukić, tried to hide the truth about Čupić's death, and fabricated a story that Čupić had turned himself over to the Turks.

== Character ==
Čupić was tall, with a slender waist, wide shoulders, mid-boned, and had strong muscles and long fingers. He had a long face, and a large brown moustache. At the time of his death he was about 50 years old, without gray hair. He was very talkative, and held long speeches on many assemblies in Belgrade. He was just in trials, and a friend of the poor. He wore armour and a steel helmet. He rode the best horses, his favourite being a dark bay horse called "Pejza" (who is also the theme of a poem). He was described as usually quick, both in thinking and execution, and undeniably heroic.

== Legacy ==
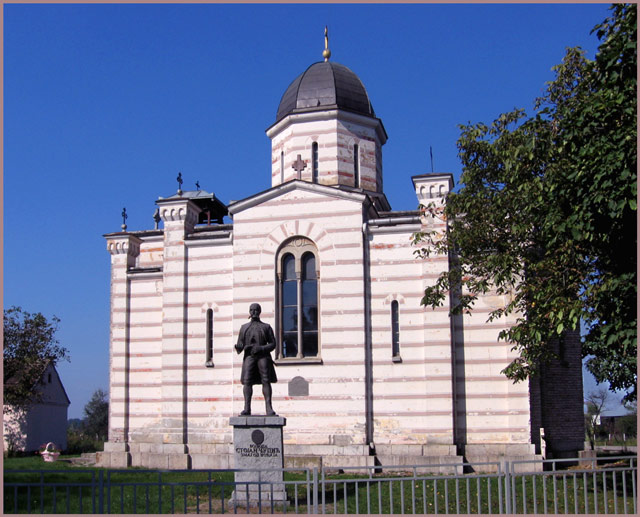
Statue in front of a Serbian Orthodox church in Salaš Noćajski.

Stojan Čupić distinguished himself at the battles of Mišar (1806); Glavica in Bosnia, where he also saved Cincar-Janko's life; Klenje; Bajina Bašta, when he also dueled beg Zulumbić in Bosnia; and Crnobarski Salaš, about which Filip Višnjić authored a poem. He was dubbed "the Dragon of Noćaj" (Zmaj od Noćaja; pronounced [zmâj ɔd nɔ̌tɕaja]) in the epic poetry due to his quick-thinking and heroism.

A statue has been erected in his honour in front of the church in Salaš Noćajski. There are several streets named after him, such as in Belgrade, Niš, and others. An annual cultural festival named after him is held at Salaš Noćajski. A relative of his has planned to recreate the church he founded in 1811 in the village (2009). His clothing and weapons are at display in the Museum in Šabac.

One of his few remaining descendants is Matija Čupić.

== See also ==
- List of Serbian Revolutionaries

== Sources ==
- Gavrilović, Andra (1904). Црте из историје ослобођења Србије [Drawings of History of the Liberation of Serbia]. Belgrade: Нздање дворске књпжаре Мите Стајића у Београду. pp. 110–115 – via Archive.org.
- Milićević, Milan Đ. (1888). Поменик знаменитих људи у српског народа новијега доба [Memory Book]. Издање Чупићеве задужбине. pp. 834–839 – via Archive.org.
- Milošević, Zoran (1999). "Ko je izdao zmaja od noćaja". Srpsko Nasleđe (13).
- Nenadović, Konstantin N. (1884). Живот и дела великог Ђорђа Петровића Кара-Ђорђа [Life and Deeds of Great Đorđe Petrović Kara-Đorđe]. Vol. II (1 ed.). Vienna: У Штампарији Јована Н. Вернаја – via Google Books.
- Nenadović, Konstantin N. (1903) [1883]. Живот и дела великог Ђорђа Петровића Кара-Ђорђа [Life and Deeds of Great Đorđe Petrović Kara-Đorđe]. Vol. I (2 ed.). Belgrade: Штампа Савића и Комп. pp. 657–659 – via Archive.org.
- Nenadović, Matija (1893). Memoari. Srpska književna zadruga. pp. 99, 179–188, 190, 197, 238.
- Protić, Kosta (1891). "Ратни догађаји из другог српског устанка, год. 1815". Годишњица Николе Чупића. XXXI. Državna štamparija: 1–104 – via Google Books.
