= Zeka Buljubaša =

Serbian commander

- Јован Глигоријевић
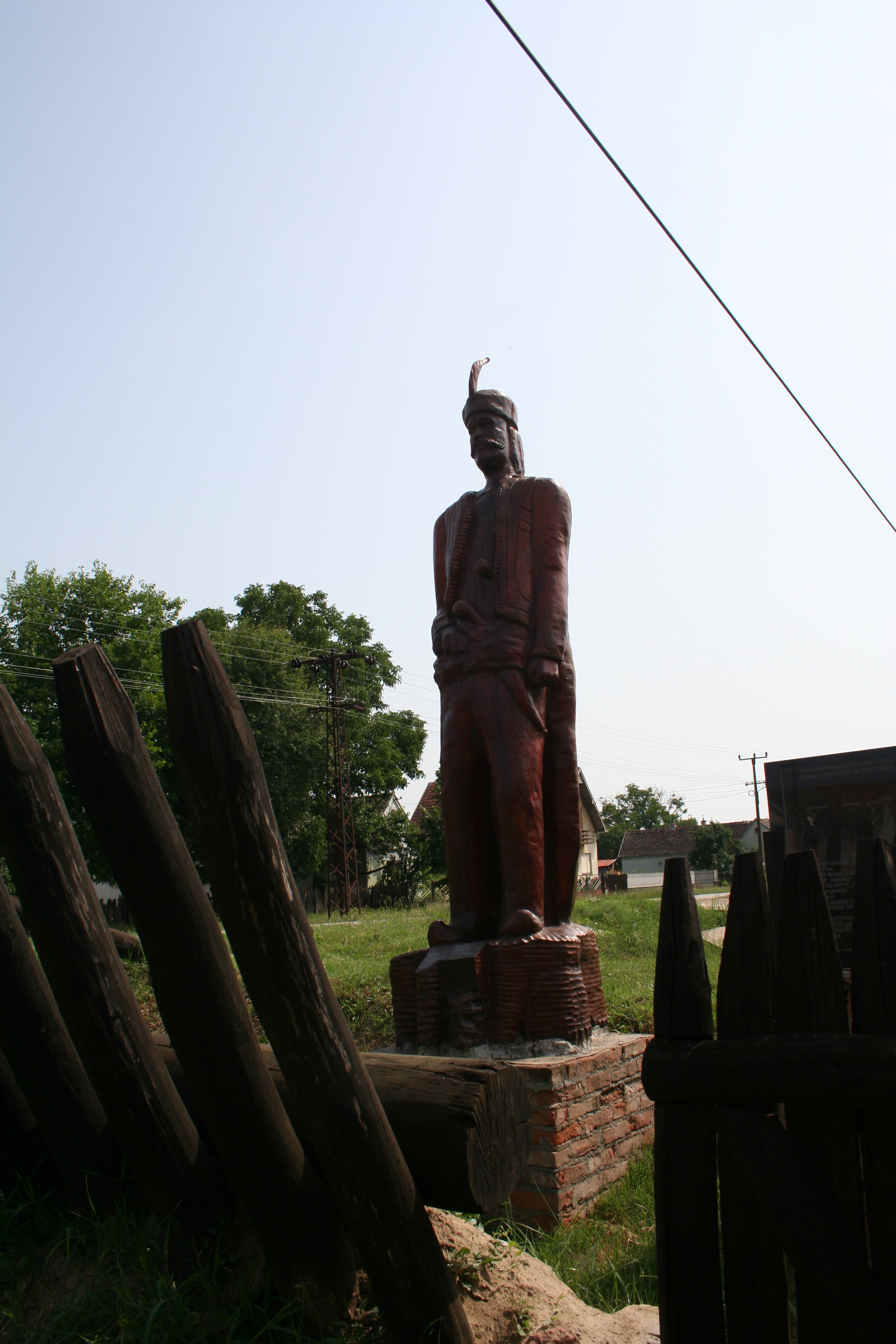
- Statue in Ravnje.
- Born: Jovan Gligorijević c. 1785; Sjenica, Sanjak of Bosnia
- Military career
- Allegiance: Revolutionary Serbia (1804–13)
- Service years: 1804–13
- Rank: buljubaša (captain)
- Nickname: Zeka Buljubaša (Зека Буљубаша)
- Conflicts: First Serbian Uprising (1804–13)

Jovan Gligorijević (Serbian Cyrillic: Јован Глигоријевић, c. 1785–1813), known as Zeka Buljubaša (Зека Буљубаша), was a Serbian revolutionary captain (buljubaša) active during the First Serbian Uprising (1804–13).

== Early life ==
Jovan Gligorijević was born in c. 1785, in Sjenica. His family hailed from Nevesinje. He was brought up working for Serb and Turk merchants, from where he learnt to ride horses, use weapons, and the Turkish language. He went to school in a monastery. His parents called him zeka (from zeleno, "green") due to his green eyes.

Zeka came to the Sanjak of Smederevo due to the outbreak of the First Serbian Uprising. Prior to the uprising, he lived in Višegrad. A story goes that he left his home village after falling out with his close friend, a Turk from Nevesinje, after telling him about murdering a Turk man who was about to rape a Serb widow, his neighbour; the friend told Zeka that his Islamic faith could not look over this, and suggested a gun duel; Zeka shot him in the shoulder and immediately left his home for Višegrad. He was not yet 20 years old at that time.

== Career ==
At first, Zeka served in the company of vojvoda (general) Stojan Čupić in Mačva, then served as border protection by the Drina (towards the Bosnia Eyalet). He was usually posted in Parašnica near Crna Bara. Another of Čupić's captains was Sima Katić.

Zeka formed a company of 50–200 men, called the Goli Sinovi ("Naked Sons"), made up of bachelors without houses or families, at first "naked" (badly equipped), and although the name implied poverty, the soldiers were richly dressed and armed. Zeka and his company also participated in great battles, such as Lešnica and Loznica, but especially successfully watched enemy movements and intercepted troops. Zeka gathered information on the troops on the other side of the Drina and enthusiastically thwarted their intentions. After receiving the rank of buljubaša he became known by the people as "Zeka Buljubaša". He distinguished himself in battles as a hero.

He commanded a company of volunteers, who were sometimes dressed in broadcloth, though armed with the most beautiful weapons. In 1813, he commanded a brigade (800–1000 soldiers) in the last battle of First Serbian Uprising, Battle of Ravnje. When the brigade's ammunition ran out, they rushed the Ottomans with knives and were all killed, near Zasavica.

== Legacy ==
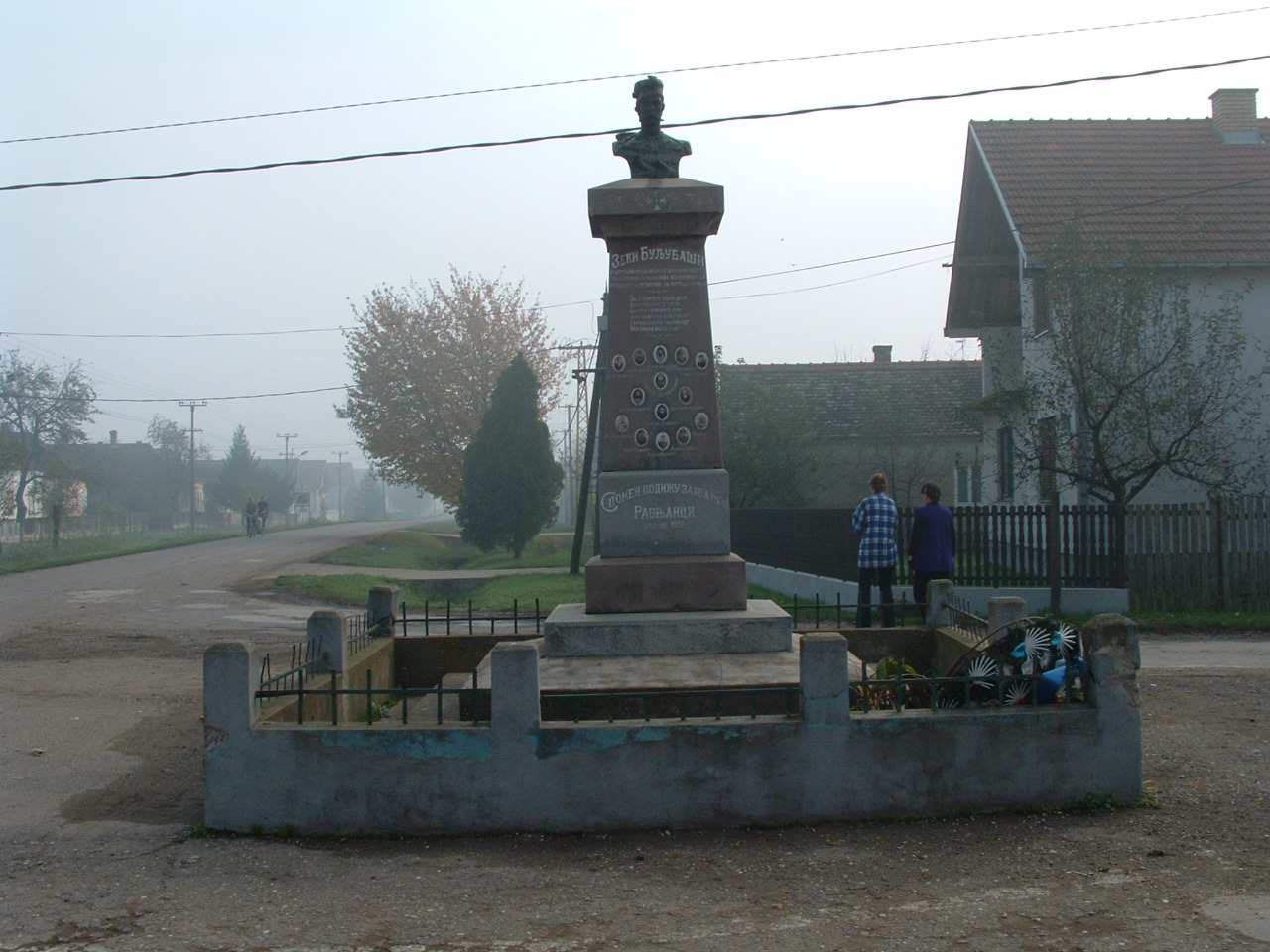
Monument in Ravnje, erected in 1926.

Dušan Baranin wrote two novels on his life, Zeko Buljubaša (1954) and Golaći (1966). A football club in Ravnje bears his name.

In the novel Hajduk Stanko by Janko Veselinović, Zeka Buljubaša is one of the main characters.

== See also ==
- List of Serbian Revolutionaries
- Timeline of the Serbian Revolution

== Sources ==
- Gavrilović, Andra (1904). Црте из историје ослобођења Србије [Drawings of History of the Liberation of Serbia]. Belgrade: Нздање дворске књпжаре Мите Стајића у Београду. pp. 110–115 – via Archive.org.
- Milićević, Milan Đ. (1888). Поменик знаменитих људи у српског народа новијега доба [Memory Book]. Издање Чупићеве задужбине. pp. 173–175 – via Archive.org.
- Nenadović, Konstantin N. (1884). Живот и дела великог Ђорђа Петровића Кара-Ђорђа. Vol. II (1 ed.). Vienna: У Штампарији Јована Н. Вернаја. pp. 659–660 – via Google Books.
- Vojnoizdavački i novinski centar. Vojska. Vol. 13. Vojnoizdavački i novinski centar. p. 27.
