= Klenje =

Klenje may refer to:

- Klenje, Bogatić, a village in western Serbia
- Klenje, Golubac, a village in eastern Serbia
- Klenje (Bela Palanka), a village in southern Serbia
- Klenjë, a village in Albania
- Klenje railway station, a railway in Ripanj near Belgrade, Serbia
