= Uroš Knežević =

Serbian painter (1811–1876)

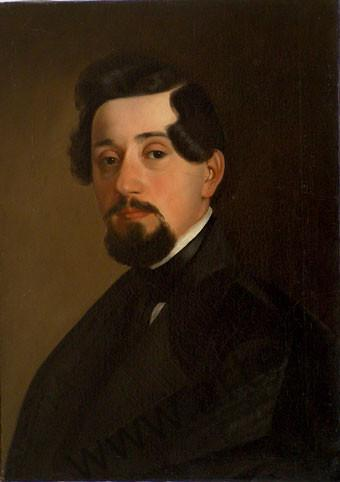
- A portrait of Knežević by Jovan Popović, 1845.
- Born: 2 January 1811; Sremski Karlovci, Austrian Empire
- Died: 21 October 1876 (aged 65); Belgrade, Principality of Serbia
- Movement: Romanticism

Uroš Knežević (Serbian Cyrillic: Урош Кнежевић; 2 January 1811 – 21 October 1876) was a Serbian painter. Knežević is best-known as portraitist, having produced more than 200 portraits, mostly of notable people of his time.

== Life ==
He was born in Sremski Karlovci to father Teodor and mother Julijana. Even though he spent most of his life in Serbia, there is very little information about his life.

About his first years of education the artist himself wrote that he had enjoyed drawing even as a child and that he felt thoroughly devoted to drawing. He first studied drawing at the Karlovci Gymnasium. He transfers from Vojvodina to Serbia in 1834, where he actively practices painting until 1844. His work was essential in introducing art to Serbia and educating the local population in art appreciation. During his time in Serbia he supported himself by painting portraits of the local nobility and prominent citizens. However, the local population was still quite unwelcoming of the art, and the portrait fees were often not paid. This made it difficult for Knežević to earn enough to support himself, let alone to save enough for his education in Vienna. Even the royal family refused to pay for the many portraits, coats of arms and other symbols that Knežević made for them.

Finally, he found well-paying work in painting walls and icons for Belgrade churches. This enabled him to save enough to study in Vienna. About his stay in Vienna he writes that it was a very happy time of his life, and he was the happiest when his work was recognized by being exhibited in the Viennese Art Exhibition of 1846. However, the Viennese Royal Art Academy does not even have a record of his name among the students. Some sources indicate that Knežević also painted the portraits of Vuk Stefanović Karadžić (Serbian linguist and reformer of the Serbian language) and his family, apart from the military, civic and political leadership.

According to the portraits made by Knežević, it can be concluded that Serbian leaders tended towards modernization; hence their portraits with remarkably luxurious clothes; golden braided and richly embroidered.

In 1871, Knežević became sick and started working less.

He is considered one of the foremost Serbian portraitist of the nineteenth century.

== Gallery ==
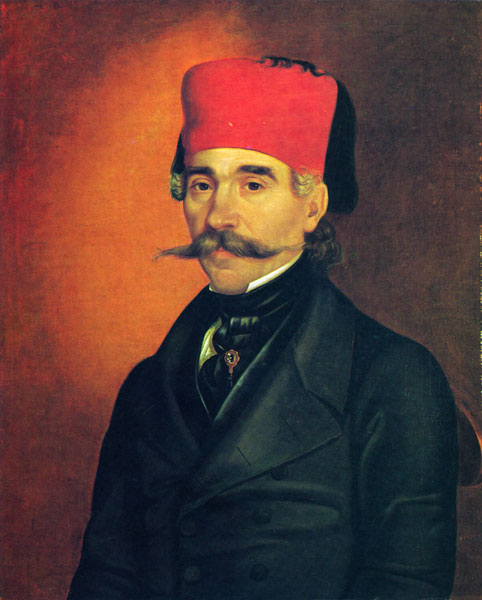
Portrait of Vuk Stefanović Karadžić, 1846

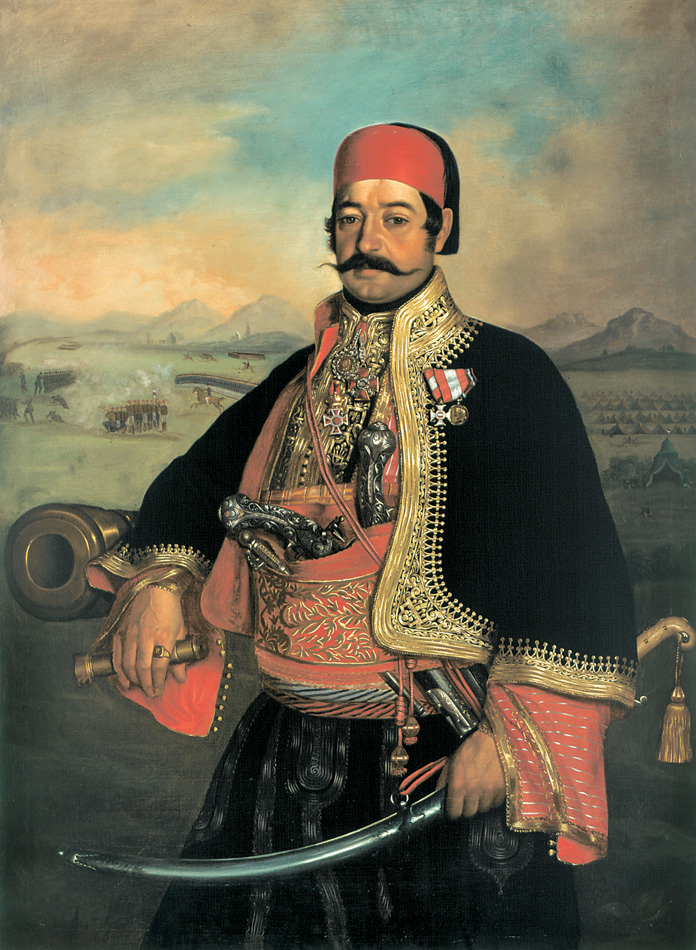
Portrait of Stevan Knićanin, 1849

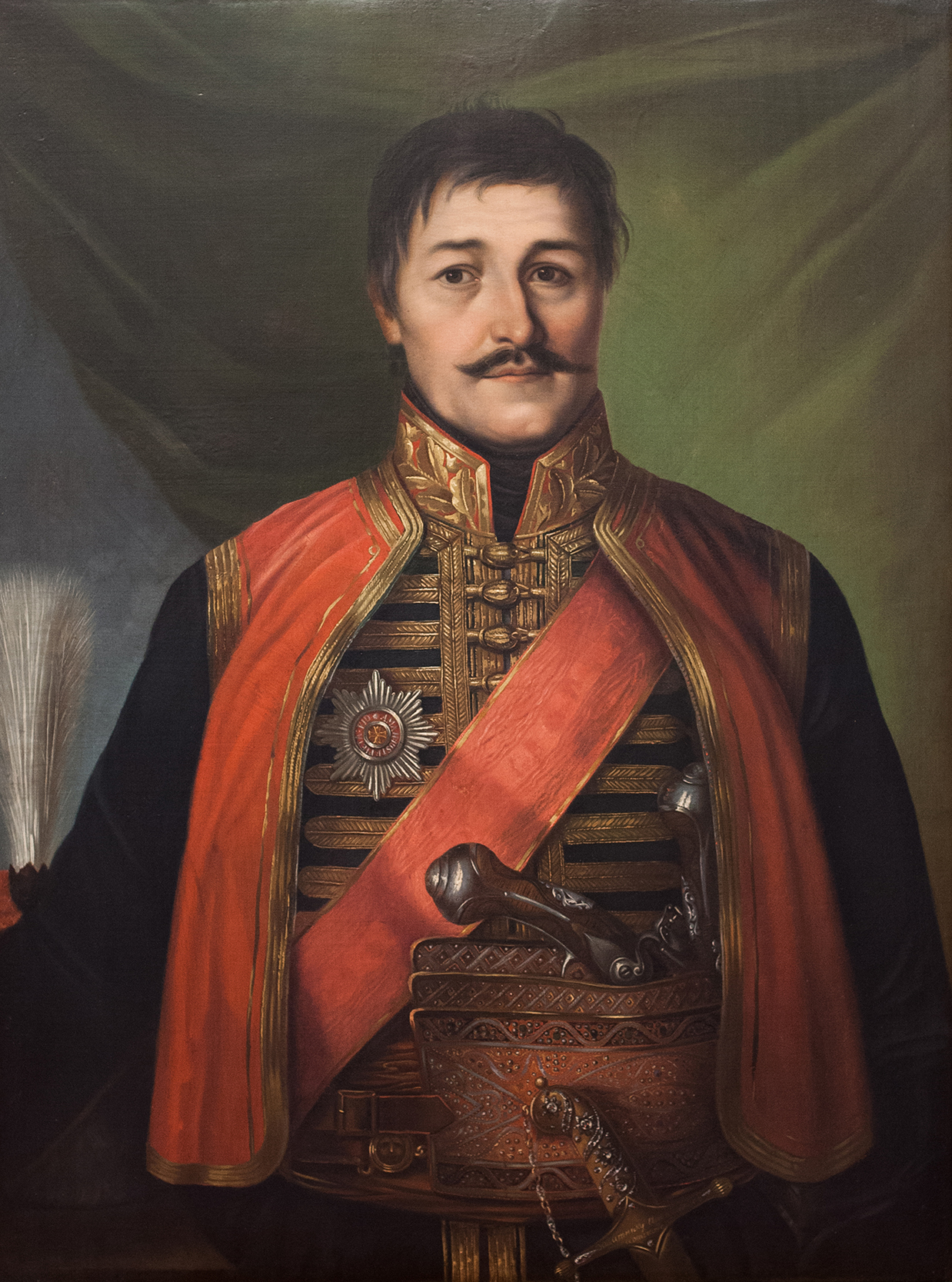
Portrait of Karađorđe Petrović, 1852

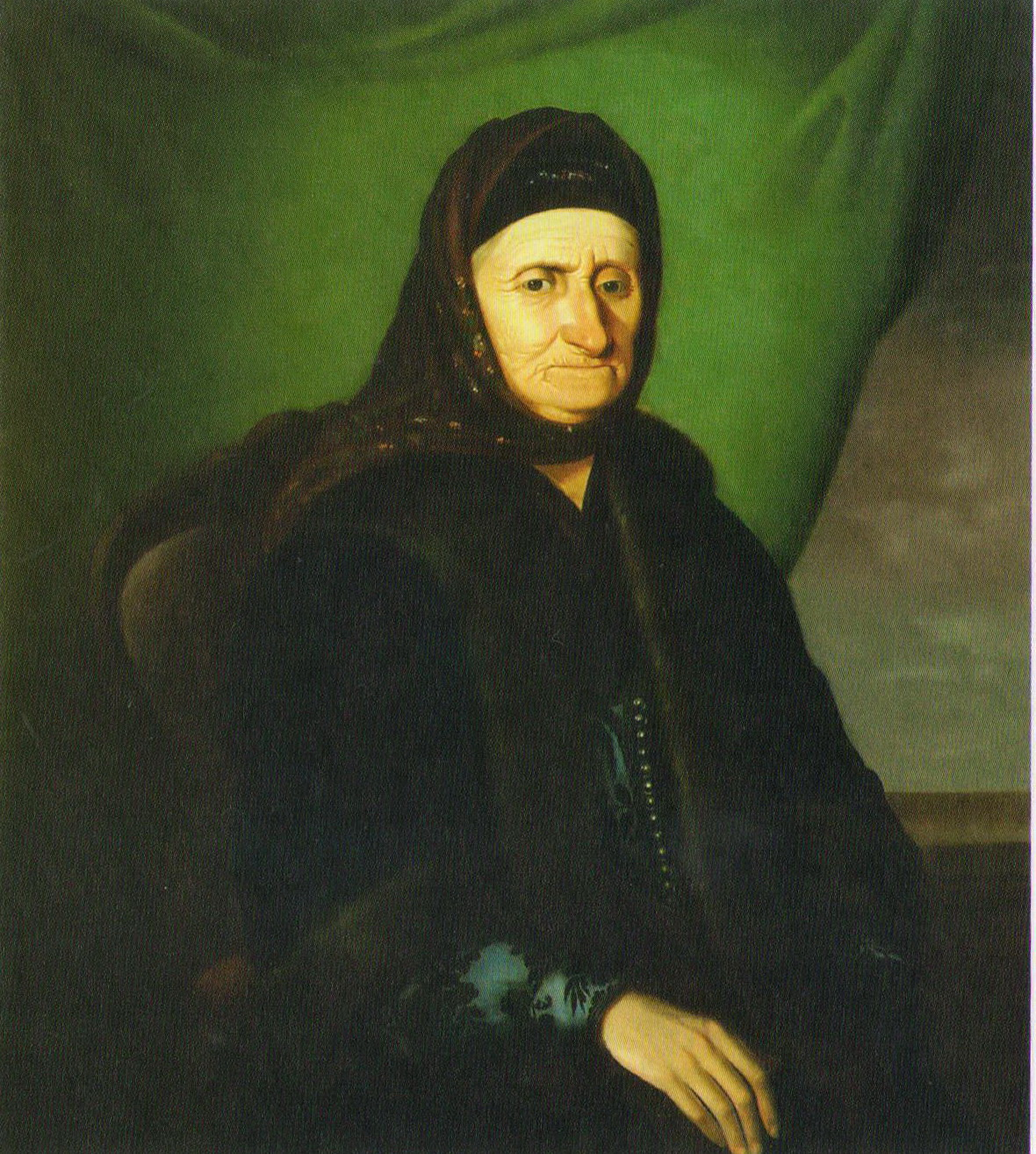
Portrait of Jelena Karađorđević, 1850

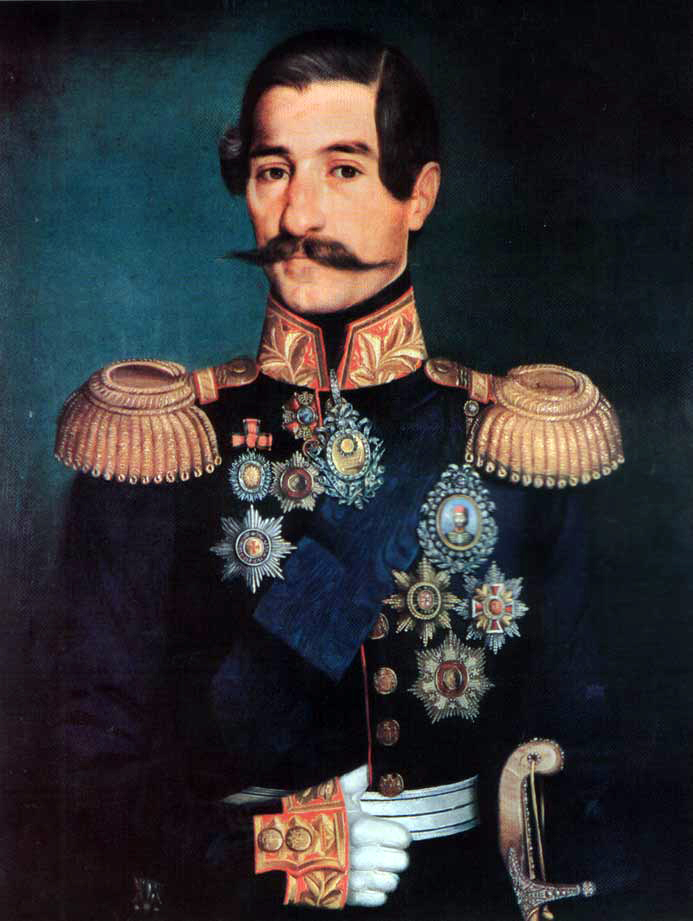
Portrait of Alexander Karađorđević, Prince of Serbia

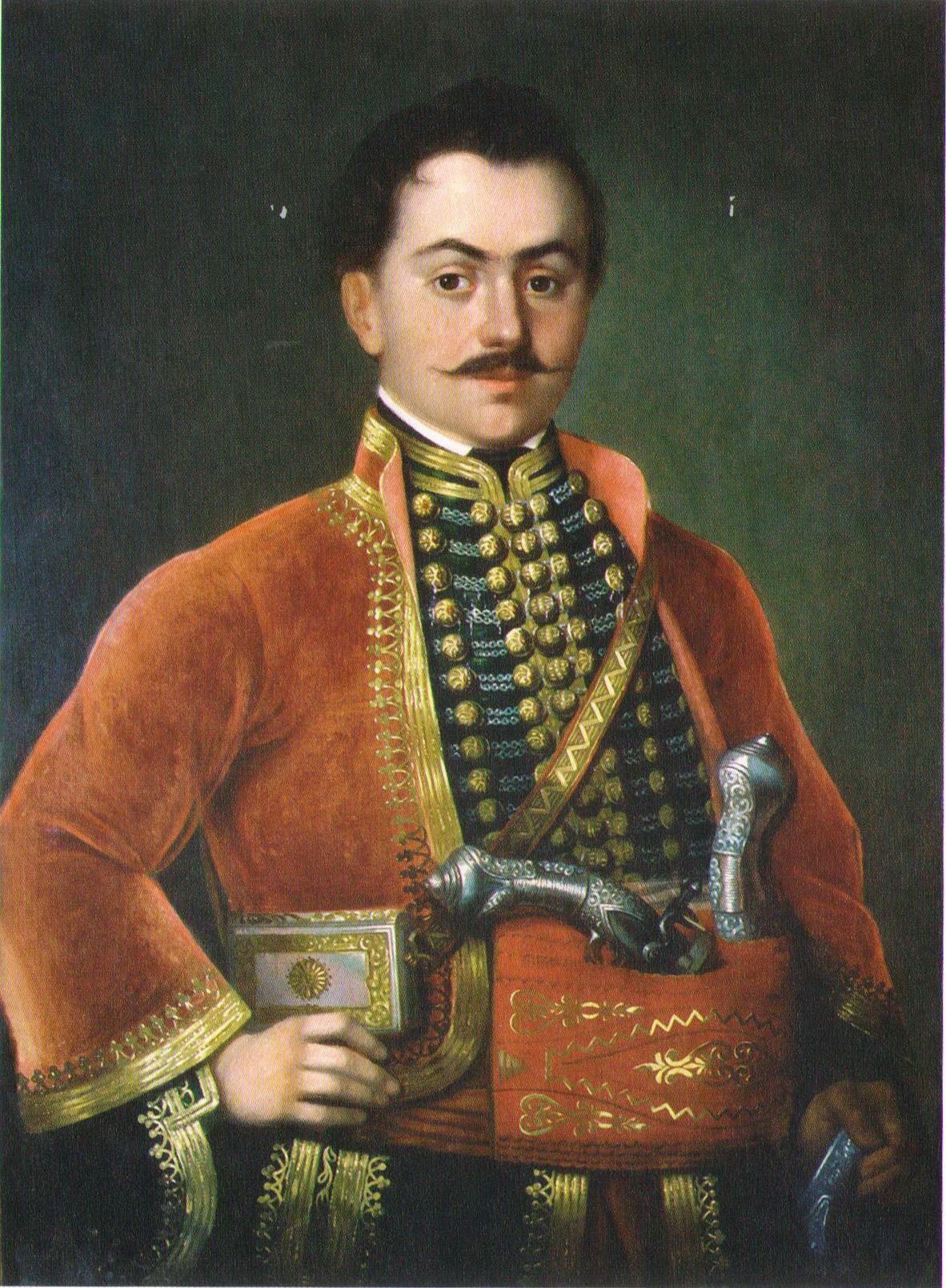
Portrait of Sima Nenadović, 1850

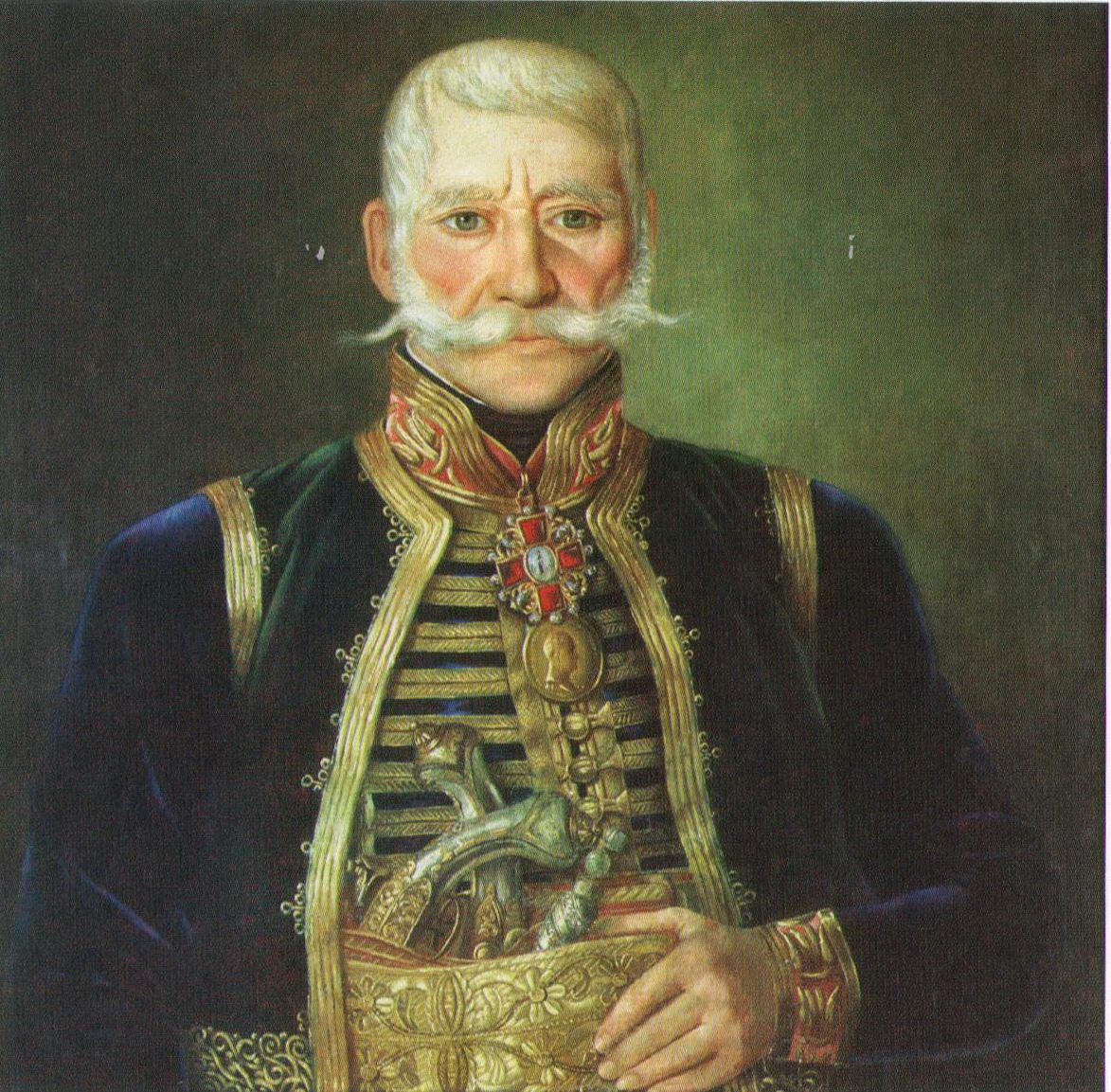
Portrait of Jakov Nenadović, 1850

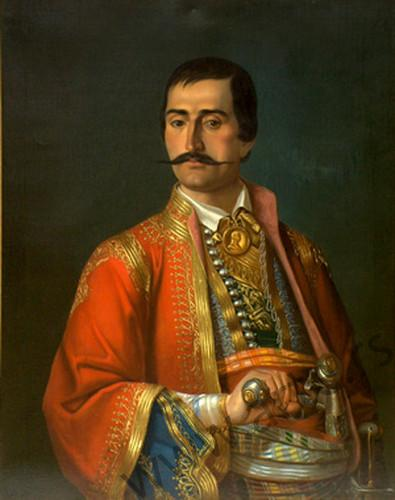
Portrait of Hajduk Veljko, 1852

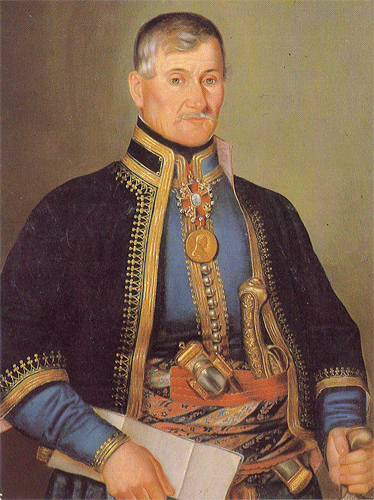
Portrait of Janićije Đurić, 1852-1855

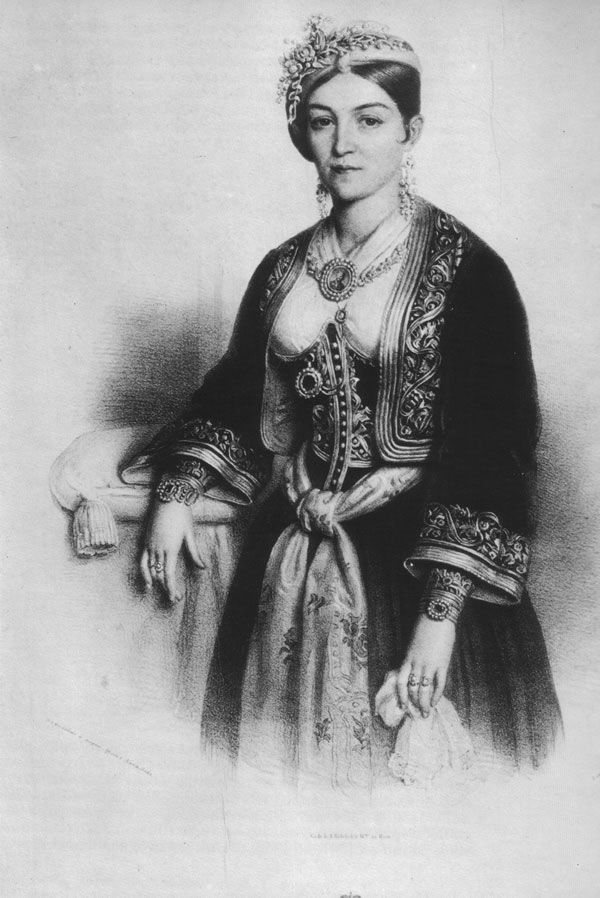
Portrait of Persida Nenadović, 1855

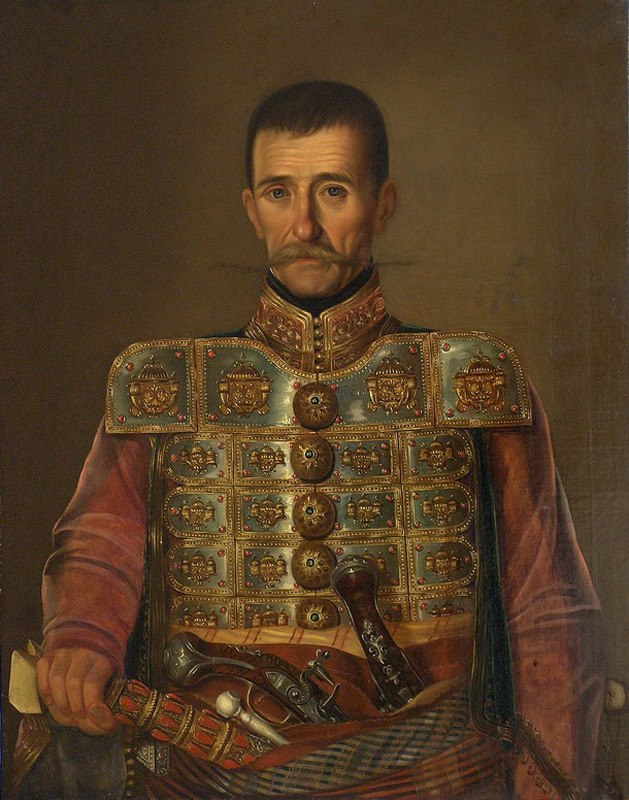
Uzun-Mirko Apostolović, 1865

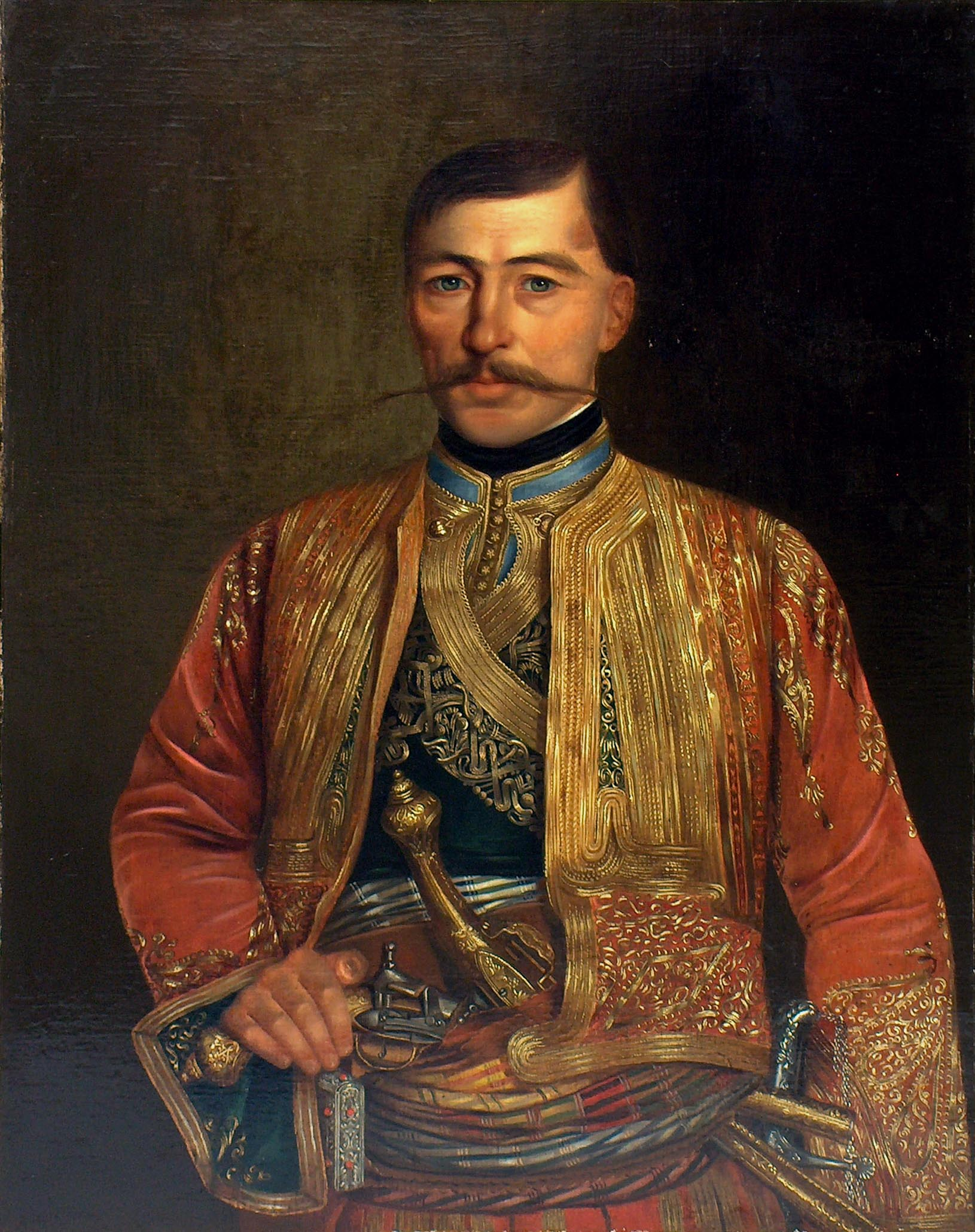
Portrait of Cincar-Janko Popović
