= Salaš Noćajski =

Salaš Noćajski Салаш Ноћајски (Serbian)
- Village (Selo)
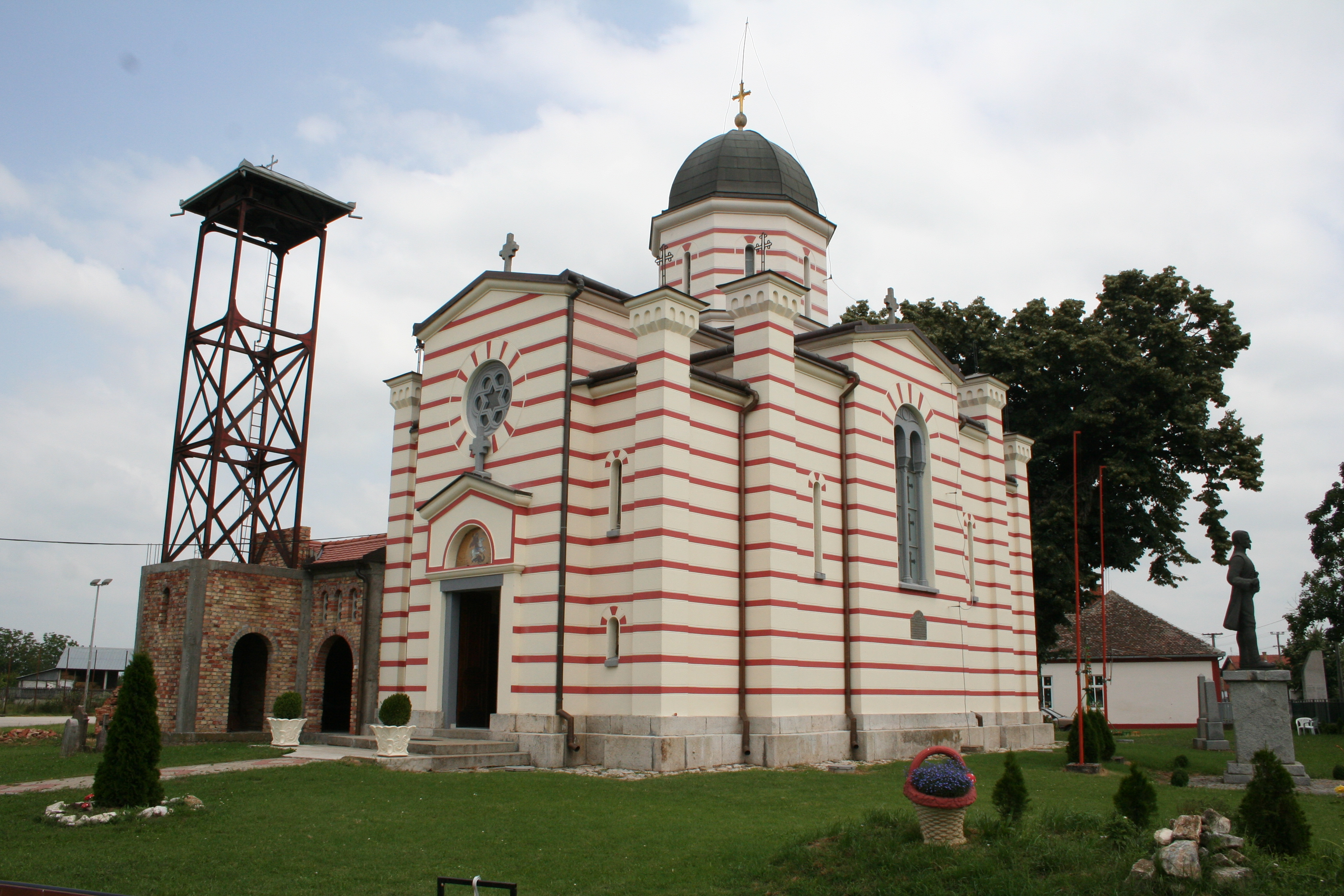
- Serbian Orthodox church

- Location within Vojvodina Location within Serbia Location within Europe
- Coordinates: 44°57′N 19°35′E
- Country: Serbia
- Province: Vojvodina
- Region: Mačva
- District: Srem
- Municipality: Sremska Mitrovica

Population (2002)
  - Total: 1,879
- Time zone: UTC+1 (CET)
  - Summer (DST): UTC+2 (CEST)

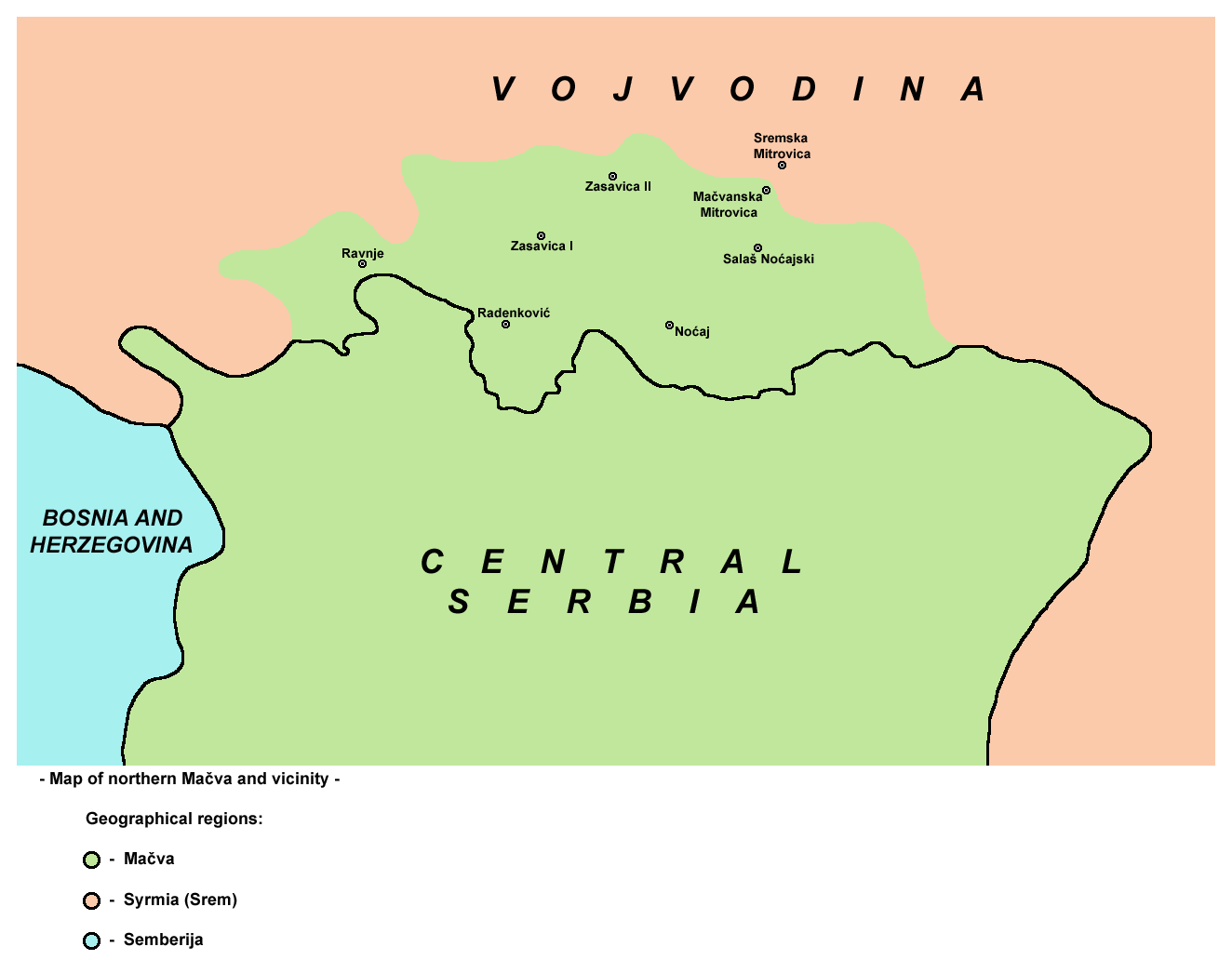
Location map of Salaš Noćajski (Noćajski Salaš) and northern part of the Mačva region

Salaš Noćajski (pronounced [sǎlaːʃ nɔtɕajskiː]) (Салаш Ноћајски) is a village in Serbia, near more known village Noćaj. It is located in the Sremska Mitrovica municipality, in the Srem District, Vojvodina province. The village has a Serb ethnic majority and its population numbering 1,879 people (2002 census). Although part of the Srem District, Salaš Noćajski is situated in the region of Mačva.

== Historical population ==
- 1961: 2,212
- 1971: 1,829
- 1981: 1,876
- 1991: 1,894

== Notable citizens ==
Stojan Čupić (1765 – 1815), one of the leaders of the First Serbian Uprising was raised in Salaš Noćajski. An annual event, Sabor Zmaja od Noćaja, is held in his honor every September.

== See also ==
- List of places in Serbia
- List of cities, towns and villages in Vojvodina
