= Noćaj =

Noćaj Ноћај (Serbian)
- Village (Selo)
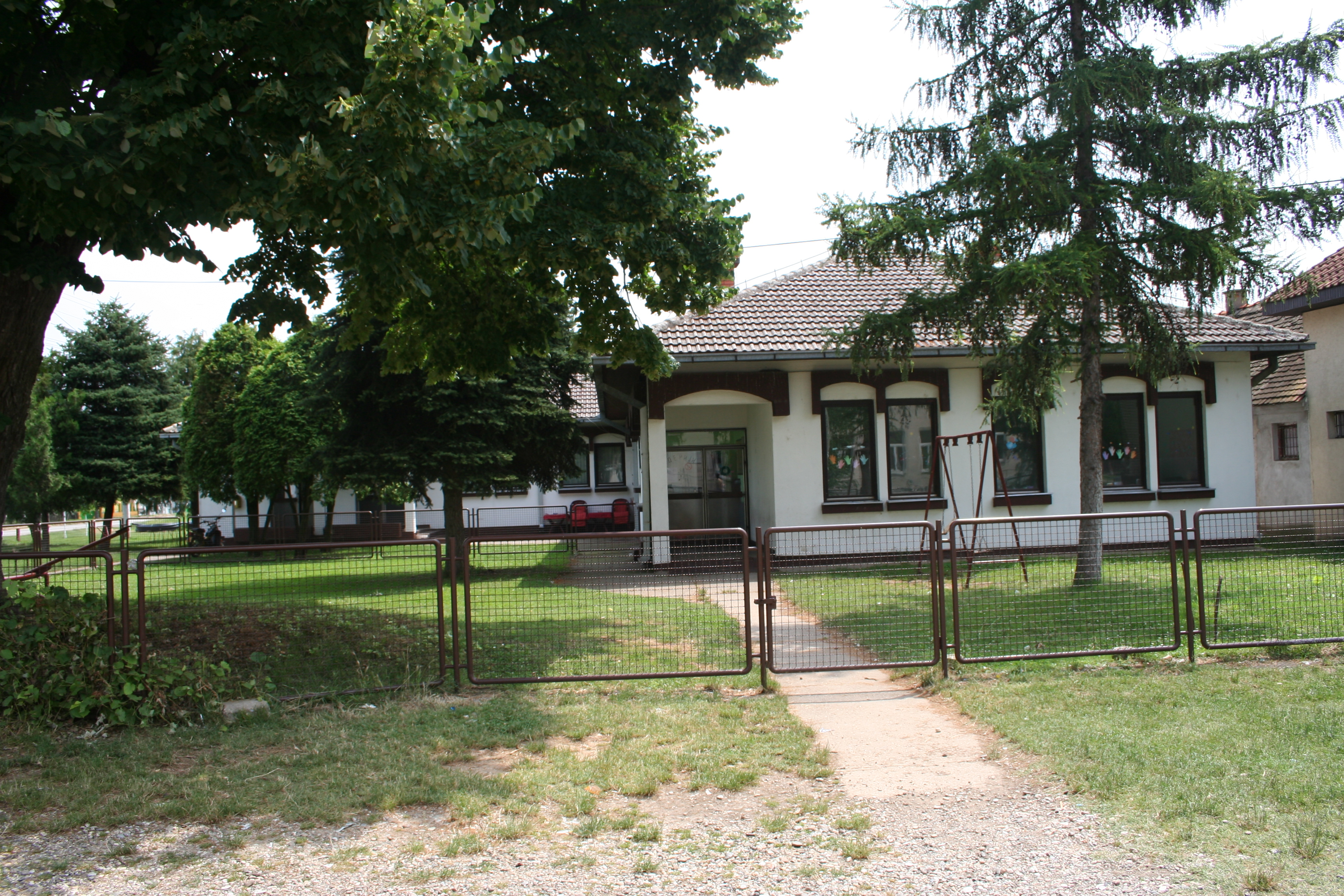

- Location within Vojvodina Location within Serbia Location within Europe
- Coordinates: 44°56′N 19°33′E
- Country: Serbia
- Province: Vojvodina
- Region: Mačva
- District: Srem
- Municipality: Sremska Mitrovica

Population (2022)
  - Total: 1,626
- Time zone: UTC+1 (CET)
  - Summer (DST): UTC+2 (CEST)
- Area code: +381(0)22

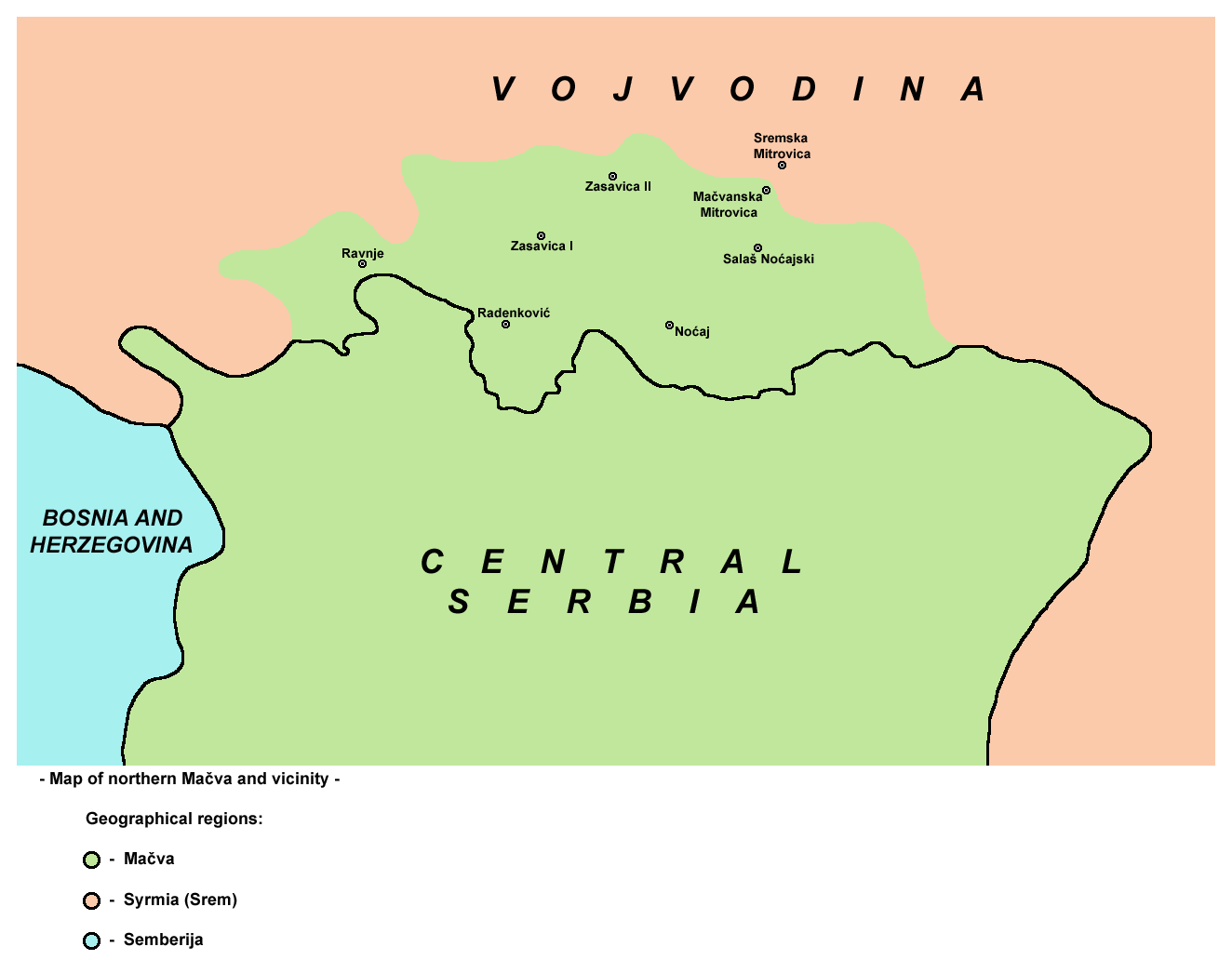
Location map of Noćaj and northern part of the Mačva region

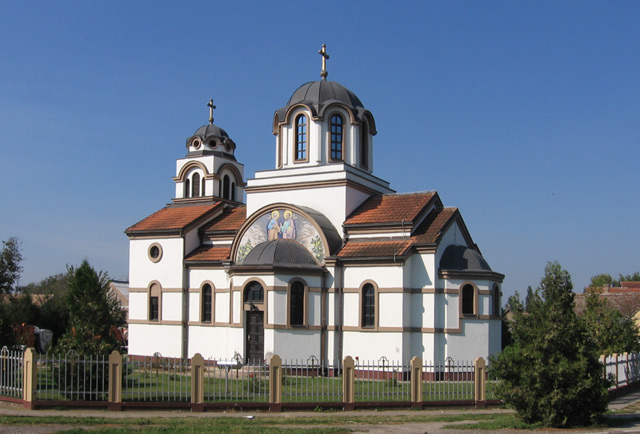
Serbian Orthodox church

Noćaj (Serbian Cyrillic: Ноћај; pronounced /ˈnɒtʃaɪ/ NO-chay) is a village in northern Serbia. It is located in the Sremska Mitrovica municipality, in the Syrmia District, Vojvodina province. Geographically, it is situated in the Mačva region. The population of Noćaj is 1,626 people (according to the 2022 census), and most of its inhabitants are ethnic Serbs.

== Geography ==
Geographically, the settlement is located in the northern part of Macva, while administratively it belongs to the Autonomous province of Vojvodina.

The Zasavica (bog) partly belongs to the area of Noćaj. This reserve is a wetland area with floodplain meadows and forests of 1825 hectares, today known for beavers.

The area of northern Macva is of a plain-swampy character, suitable for field and vegetable growing.

It is directly connected to the European route E70 via the State road 20, to the north, while it is connected to the Badovinci border crossing to the south.

== Demographics ==
Historical population
Year	Population
1931.	2,274
1948.	2,424
1953.	2,479
1961.	2,443
1971.	2,338
1981.	2,323
1991.	2,237
2002.	2,120
2011.	1,866
2022.	1,626

== Famous residents ==
It is known as the place of origin of Stojan Čupić (hero of The First Serbian Uprising). He was called 'Zmaj od Noćaja' ("the dragon of Noćaj" in English). The football club from Noćaj is called 'Zmaj'.

== See also ==
- List of places in Serbia
- List of cities, towns and villages in Vojvodina
