= Klenje, Bogatić =

Klenje Клење (Serbian)
- Village (Selo)
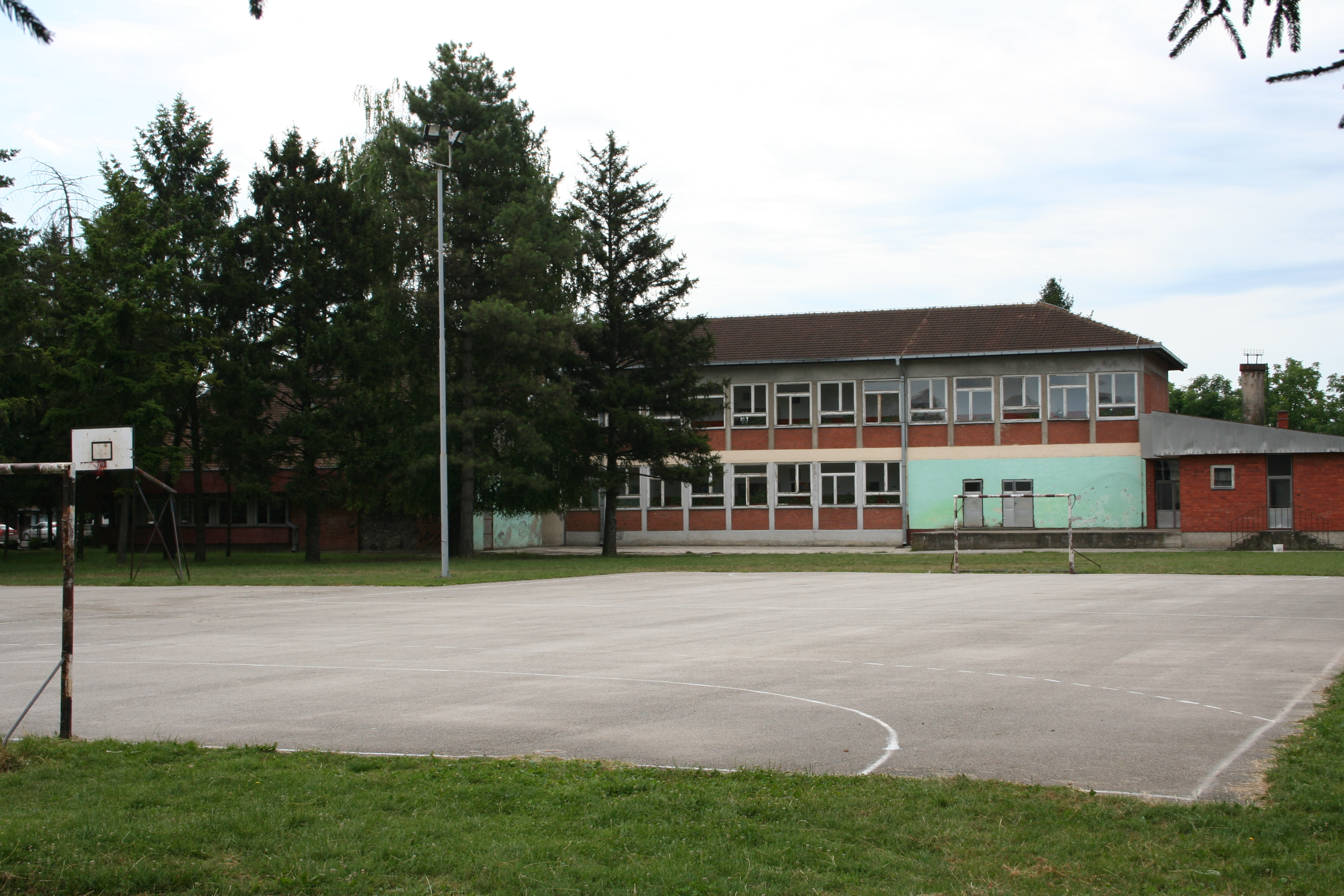
- Interactive map of Klenje
- Coordinates: 44°48′26″N 19°26′03″E
- Country: Serbia
- Statistical Region: Šumadija and Western Serbia
- Region: Mačva
- District: Mačva District
- Municipality: Bogatić
- Time zone: UTC+1 (CET)
  - Summer (DST): UTC+2 (CEST)

Klenje (Serbian Cyrillic: Клење; pronounced [klɛ̌ːɲɛ]) is a village in Serbia. It is situated in the Bogatić municipality, in the Mačva District. The village has a Serb ethnic majority and its population numbering 2,498 people (2022 census).

== See also ==
- List of places in Serbia
- Mačva
