= Dublje (Bogatić) =

Dublje Дубље (Serbian)
- Village (Selo)
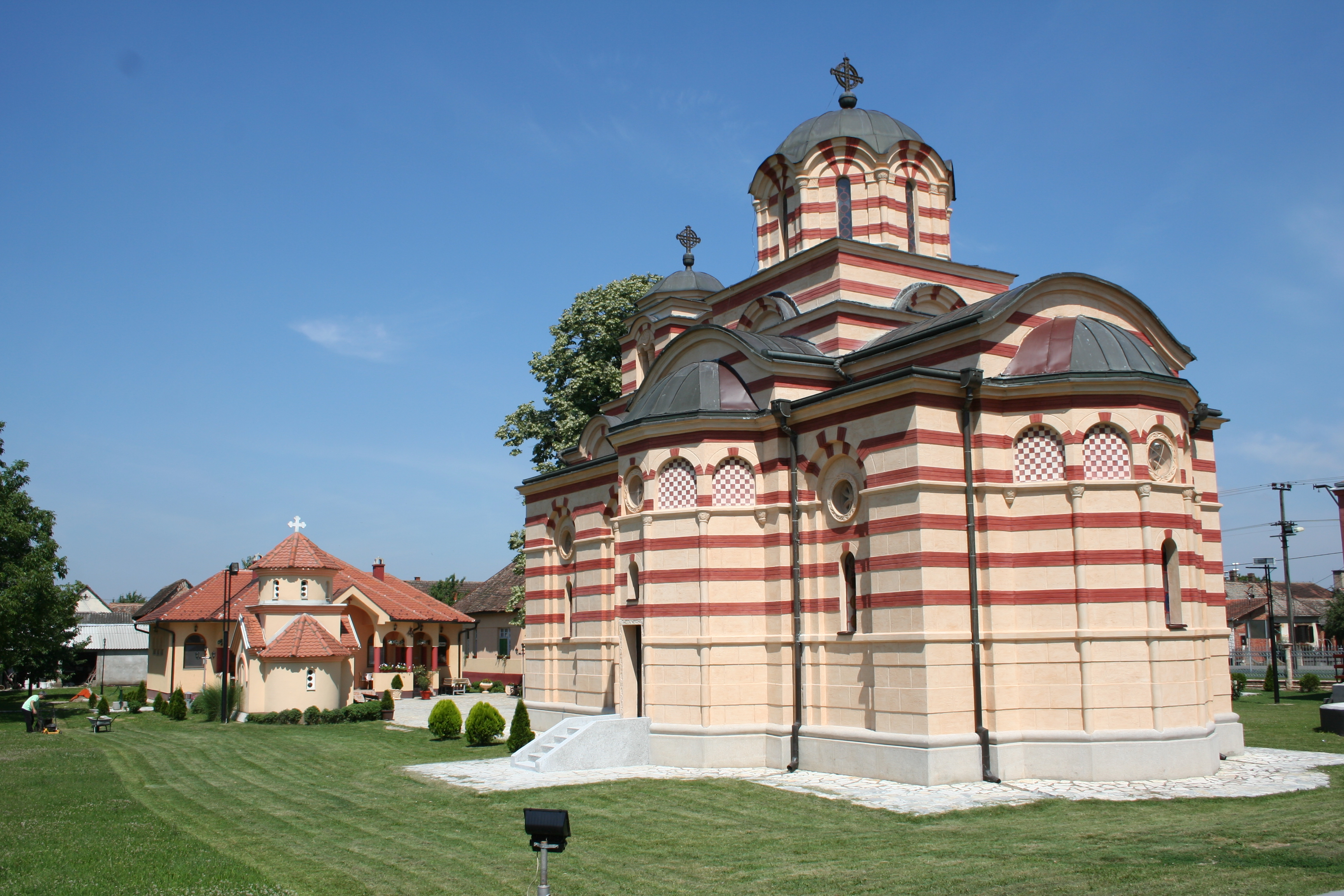

- Location within Serbia
- Coordinates: 44°48′02″N 19°30′29″E
- Country: Serbia
- Statistical Region: Šumadija and Western Serbia
- Region: Mačva
- District: Mačva District
- Municipality: Bogatić
- Time zone: UTC+1 (CET)
  - Summer (DST): UTC+2 (CEST)
- Website: Dublje.Info

Dublje (Serbian Cyrillic: Дубље, pronounced [dûːbʎɛ]) is a village in Serbia. It is situated in the Bogatić municipality, in the Mačva District. The village has a Serb ethnic majority and its population numbering 3,317 people (2002 census).

== See also ==
- List of places in Serbia
- Mačva
