= Milan Milićević =

Serbian writer, publicist and ethnologist

Milan Đakov Milićević Милан Ђаков Милићевић
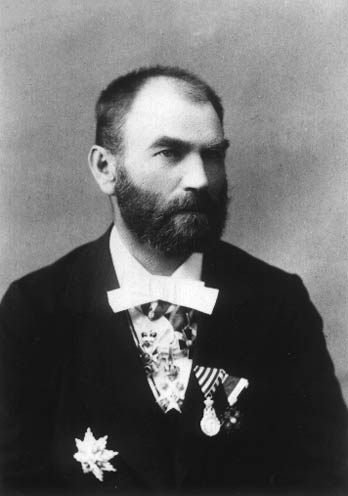
- Born: 4 June 1831; Ripanj, Principality of Serbia
- Died: 17 November 1908 (aged 77); Belgrade, Kingdom of Serbia
- Occupations: Historian, writer

Milan Đakov Milićević (Serbian: Милан Ђаков Милићевић; June 4, 1831 – November 17, 1908) was a Serbian writer, pedagogue, politician, publicist, ethnologist and academic. He was and one of the founders of the Association of Writers of Serbia.

== Biography ==
He was born of a good and old Serbian family in Ripanj, about 25 kilometers south of Belgrade at the foot of Avala mountain, on the fourth of June 1831. When Milićević was a teenager his parents moved to Belgrade. Having received his early education at the gymnasium of Belgrade (1845), he entered the Velika škola, and engaged in the study of religion and education. Although Milićević did specially distinguish himself as a student, ill health prevented him from going to Russia to pursue further studies. University life, however, had considerable influence in the development of his character and furnished him with much of his literary material. After taking a degree in 1850, he taught school in the Serbian heartland Lesnik (Serbia), and in 1851 at Topola.

In early 1852 Milićević took a clerical post at the courthouse in Valjevo, and was soon transferred to a similar post in Belgrade before joining the Ministry of Culture and Religious Affairs in 1852. Three years later Milićević transferred to the Ministry of Foreign Affairs, there he remained until 1861. From then until 1888 he served as secretary of the Ministry of Education. In 1884 the Minister of Education took him as his assistant, and in 1886 he became head librarian of the National Library of Belgrade. He entered the Skupština (Parliament) as a representative of a Belgrade constituency and as a member of the Progressive Party, led by Milutin Garašanin, son of Ilija Garašanin, and Vladan Đorđević. From 1896 to 1899 he was the president of the Serbian Academy of Sciences and Arts, and in 1899 he retired. In 1901 he celebrated his 50th anniversary as a pedagogue and novelist.

He died at Belgrade in 1908. Milićević was awarded Order of the Cross of Takovo and Order of Saint Sava.

== Work ==
=== Scholar ===
From 1868 to 1876 Milićević edited Škola (School), a tri-monthly scholastic journal. He was a voluminous writer on educational subjects, and was the author of various school-textbooks. He authored 100 books, including several novels, and published hundreds of studies, papers, monographs, and learned articles. Among his pedagological textbooks were:

Schools in Serbia (1868); A Study Guide (1869); Pedagological Studies (1870); School Hygiene (1870); History of Pedagogy (1871); School Discipline (1871); Adolf Diesterweg (1871), and Schools for the Rights of Citizens and Responsibilities (1873).

When Milićević was appointed secretary of the Ministry of Education he immediately put into practice methods of the most celebrated reformers of education of the past and present, Dositej Obradović (Serbia), Teodor Janković-Mirijevski (Austria and Russia), Johann Heinrich Pestalozzi (Switzerland), Friedrich Fröbel (Germany), Adolph Diesterweg (Germany), Ferdinand Buisson (France), and others. He translated the works of the great French writers, philosophers and educators of his time, Paris in America by Édouard Laboulaye (1863); Moral History of Women (1876) and Fathers and Children in the Nineteenth Century (Vols. 1 & 2, 1872 and 1873) by Ernest Legouvé; Women of the 20th Century by Jules Simon; Émile by Jean-Jacques Rousseau, and works by Montesquieu (Persian Letters) and Jules Sandeau (Galebova stena). Milićević translated Russian author Alexander Hilferding's history of the Serbians and Bulgarians, Pisma o istoriji Srba i Bugara, and Ignaty Potapenko's 1892 short story Istinska sluzba (True Vocation).

=== Historian and Ethnologist ===
His first books dealt with the history, geography, and customs of his people. In 1857 he published two books, The Serbian Peasant and Serbian Towns which attracted some attention. It was followed by a three more book entitled The Life of Serbian Peasants (Vol 1, 1868; Vol. 2, 1873; Vol 3, 1877).

In his early years, Milićević acquired a love of national customs and traditions which his humanist education never obliterated, while, in addition, he learned to know the whole range of our popular literature (Narodne pesme) -- legends, songs and fairy tales which were collected and published by Vuk Stefanović Karadžić. These circumstances explain the richness of his vocabulary and joined to an ardent patriotism they fitted him to become a political leader and a leading scholar, proponent of the Vukovian School (Vukova škola). As a scholar, he gave a fresh impulse to Vuk Karadžić's reforms in his early and later works. At the time, there were many historians who raised methodological questions. A step towards broader views and the application of modern European methodological principles was taken through the works of Milan Djakov Milićević, Jovan Skerlić and Jovan Cvijić.

He has written:

- Lessons in Civil Rights and Responsibilities (1873)
- Principality of Serbia (1876)
- Serbian Peasant Life (in the Glasnik: 1867 and 1875)
- Kingdom of Serbia (1884)
- The stories of Serbian life in the 19th century: "Jurmusa i Fatima" and "White Evenings" (1879)
- Biographies of Famous People in Present-day Serbia/Pomenik znamenitih ljudi u srpskog naroda novijega doba (1888)
- Petar Jokić: Events and People in the First Serbian Uprising (1891)
- Prince Miloš and His Story (1891)
- Karađorđe (1903)
- Monument/Pomenik znameniti ljudi u srpskoga naroda novijega doba (1888)

In the introduction of his Principality of Serbia (1876), Milićević concluded in didactic verse: "Knowledge is enlightenment, will is might, let us work, day and night."

From 1873 to his death his work was educational, with the exception of a short stint in politics before his retirement. As president of the Learned Society, Milićević enlarged the resources and number of the institution, which had hundreds of members by the turn of the century. In other fields, he promoted common school education (especially manual training), the work of the public library, and took an active part in the discussion of women's rights, economics, statistical and other public questions, holding many offices of honor and responsibility. As an author, he wrote on the government treatment of the poor, underprivileged, and general political economy besides producing monographs on the life of Petar Jokić, a buljukbasha of Karađorđe's guard who died in 1852, and the history of Serbia in his own time.

In 1878 the Serbian Learned Society (Srpsko učeno društvo) elected Slovak professor Janko Šafarik (father of Pavle Šafarik), Milićević and Serbian painter Stevan Todorović to collect ethnographic objects in Serbia for an exhibit at the Pan-Slavic Congress in St. Peterburg. Milićević and Todorović selected 600 national costumes and Todorović supplied twenty photographs from Serbia. Officially, however, it was Milan Milićević who led the delegation, both as the chief delegate of the Serbian Learned Society and by virtue of his fluency in the Russian language.

=== Politics ===
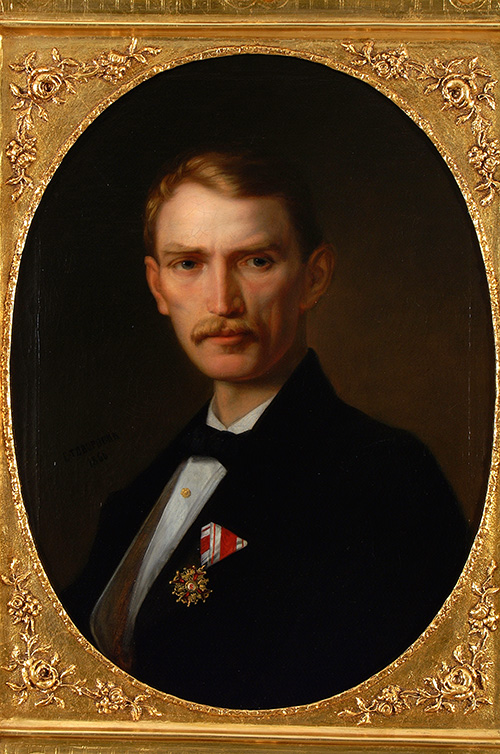
Portrait of Milićević by Stevan Todorović, National Museum of Serbia

As a politician Milićević had an active career with the Progressive Party, led by Milutin Garašanin, son of Ilija Garašanin, and Vladan Đorđević. He was the co-founder of the Progressive party, which sprang from the group of young conservatives, imbued with Western liberalism. Their better known regional leaders were Milan Piroćanac, Čedomilj Mijatović, historian Stojan Novaković, poet Milan Kujundžić-Aberdar, poet, novelist and dramatist Milorad Popović Šapčanin, and Milan Đakov Milićević.

From 1896 he entered the Skupština (Serbian Parliament) as representative of a Belgrade constituency, representing the Progressive Party, but decided three years later to retire. Milićević believed that the solidarity of Slavic nations should recognize and not repudiate the principle of distinctive national differences while contributing to the mutual respect and understanding of all humankind. Professing advanced Liberal and democratic views, he often had to defend personal freedoms to those who were used to strong-arm tactics.

=== Literary work ===
Literary critic Jovan Skerlić classed Milićević with Stjepan Mitrov Ljubiša (1824–1878), an excellent Serbian short story writer originally from Montenegro. The two were famed as story tellers, like Joksim Nović-Otočanin and Jovan Sundečić a generation before.

== Personal life ==
He married twice and was survived by his second wife, whom he married at the age of 60.

According to his own last testament, he was buried in Belgrade, next to his wives. In his testament, he left money and other possessions to his family members, cousins, and even to the household servants.

== Works ==
- Milićević, Milan Đ. (1867). "Манастири у Србији". Гласник српског ученог друштва. IV (XXI). у Државној штампарији: 1–97 – via Google Books.
- Školska higijena, 1870
- Milićević, Milan Đ. (1888). Поменик знаменитих људи у српског народа новијега доба. Издање Чупићеве задужбине – via Archive.org.
- Dodatak pomeniku od 1888. Znameniti ljudi u srpskoga naroda koji su preminuli do kraja 1900.
- Pomenik znamenitih ljudi u srpskom narodu noviega doba, Belgrade, 1901
- Knez Miloš u pričama, 1891
- Knez Miloš u pričama II. 1900
- Knez Miliš u spomenicima svog nekadašnjeg sekretara, Belgrade, 1896
- Žena XX veka, napisala Žil SImon i Gustav Simon, Belgrade, 1894
- Kneževina Srbija, Belgrade,, 1876.
- Kraljevina Srbija: Novi krajevi, Belgrade, 1884
- Čupić Stojan i Nikola, Belgrade, 1875
- Život i dela velikih ljudi iz svih naroda I, Belgrade, 1877
- Život i dela velikih ljudi iz svih naroda II, Belgrade, 1877
- Život i dela velikih ljudi iz svih naroda III, Belgrade, 1879
- Karađorđe u govori u stvoru, Belgrade, 1904
- Putnička pisma
- Beleške kroz put pet okružja po Srbiji
- Iz svojih uspomena
- Život Srba seljaka
- Slave u Srba
- Iz svojih uspomena
- Zadružna kuća na selu
- Pedagogijske pouke
- Kako se uči knjiga
- Školska disciplina
- Pogled na narodno školovanje u Srbiji
- Moralna žena
- Zimnje večeri
- Selo Zloselica i učitelj Milivoje
- Jurmus i Fatima
- Omer Čelebija

Academic offices
| Preceded by Dimitrije Nešić | President of Serbian Academy of Sciences and Arts; 1896–1899 | Succeeded by Jovan Ristić |
Cultural offices
| Preceded by Nićifor Dučić | Director of National Library of Serbia; 1886–188? | Succeeded by Dragiša Stojanović |
