= Zasavica =

Zasavica can refer to:

- Zasavica, Dobretići, a village in Bosnia and Herzegovina
- Zasavica (Šamac), a village near Šamac, Bosnia and Herzegovina
- Zasavica (river), a river in Serbia
- Zasavica (bog), a bog in Serbia
- Zasavica I, a village in Serbia
- Zasavica II, a village in Serbia
