= Zasavica (river) =

Zasavica (Засавица)
- Mouth of the Zasavica

Location
- Country: Serbia

Physical characteristics
- Source
  - location: Mačva, west of Bogatić
- Mouth
  - location: Sava river, at Sremska Mitrovica, Vojvodina
  - coordinates: 44.9612°N 19.6042°E
- Length: 34 km (21 mi)
- Basin size: 120 km^{2} (46 sq mi)

Basin features
- Progression: Sava→ Danube→ Black Sea

The Zasavica (Serbian Cyrillic: Засавица, pronounced [ˈzâsaʋit͜sa]) is a river in the Mačva region in west-central Serbia. It is a 33.1 km-long right tributary of the Sava River, which flows entirely within the Mačva region.

== Flow ==
It originates from several streams out of the swamps north of the village of Salaš Crnobarski, in the floodplain of the lower course of the Drina River. The river flows in a north-east direction for 10 km parallel to the flow of the Sava and next to the villages of Glogovac, Sovljak, Crna Bara, Banovo Polje and Radenković, where the river crosses the administrative border of Central Serbia and the province of Vojvodina, where it flows near the settlements of Ravnje, Zasavica I, Zasavica II, Noćaj, and Mačvanska Mitrovica. At village of Banovo Polje, two major headstreams, the Jovača and Prekopac, meet, and from that point the river is called the Zasavica.

Near the village of Zasavica, the river enters the marshy area of the Zasavica bog where the nominally 50–60 meter-wide stream spreads to almost 300 meters and becomes 2 meters deep. It meanders through the middle of the town until flowing into the Sava at Mačvanska Mitrovica, right across the town of Sremska Mitrovica on the Sava. The final section is channeled (Bogaz canal), and the river often floods the surrounding area.

The name of the river could be translated as the “behind Sava”. It actually flows through the typical elongated "mrtvaja" (oxbow), the old (fossil) bed of both the Sava and later, the Drina rivers. Because of the river’s meandering course and the low terrain, a bog was created, while the river itself changes the course depending on how much atmospheric waters it gets during the year.

== Flora and fauna ==
The river is the main watercourse of the Zasavica Special Nature Reserve. It is the habitat for the waterwheel plant (Aldrovanda vesiculosa), which had been considered extinct for centuries until its discovery in Zasavica. It is also the habitat for the endangered European mudminnow (Umbra kameri).
