= Ravnje =

Ravnje may refer to:

- Ravnje, Sežana, a village in the municipality of Sežana, Slovenia
- Ravnje (Sremska Mitrovica), a village in the municipality of Sremska Mitrovica, Vojvodina, Serbia
- Ravnje (Valjevo), a village in the municipality of Valjevo, Serbia
