= Zminjak =

Zminjak Змињак (Serbian)
- Village (Selo)
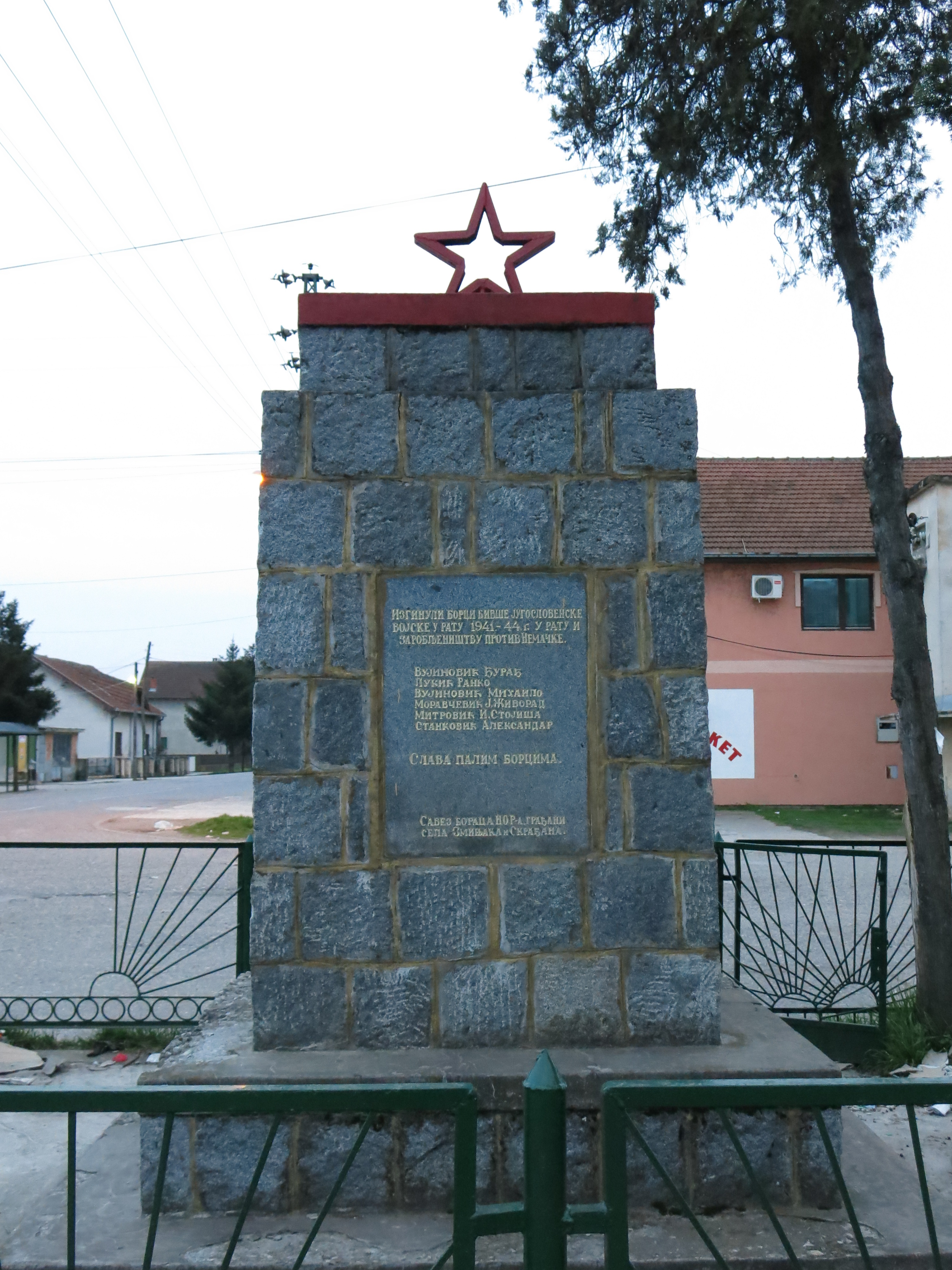

- Location within Serbia
- Coordinates: 44°45′N 19°28′E
- Country: Serbia

Population (2022)
  - Total: 1,031
- Time zone: UTC+1 (CET)
  - Summer (DST): UTC+2 (CEST)

Zminjak (Serbian Cyrillic: Змињак) is a village in Serbia. It is situated in the Šabac municipality, in the Mačva District. The village has a Serb ethnic majority and its population numbering 1,031 people (2022 census).

== See also ==
- List of places in Serbia
- Mačva
