= Mačvanska Mitrovica =

Mačvanska Mitrovica Мачванска Митровица (Serbian)
- Town
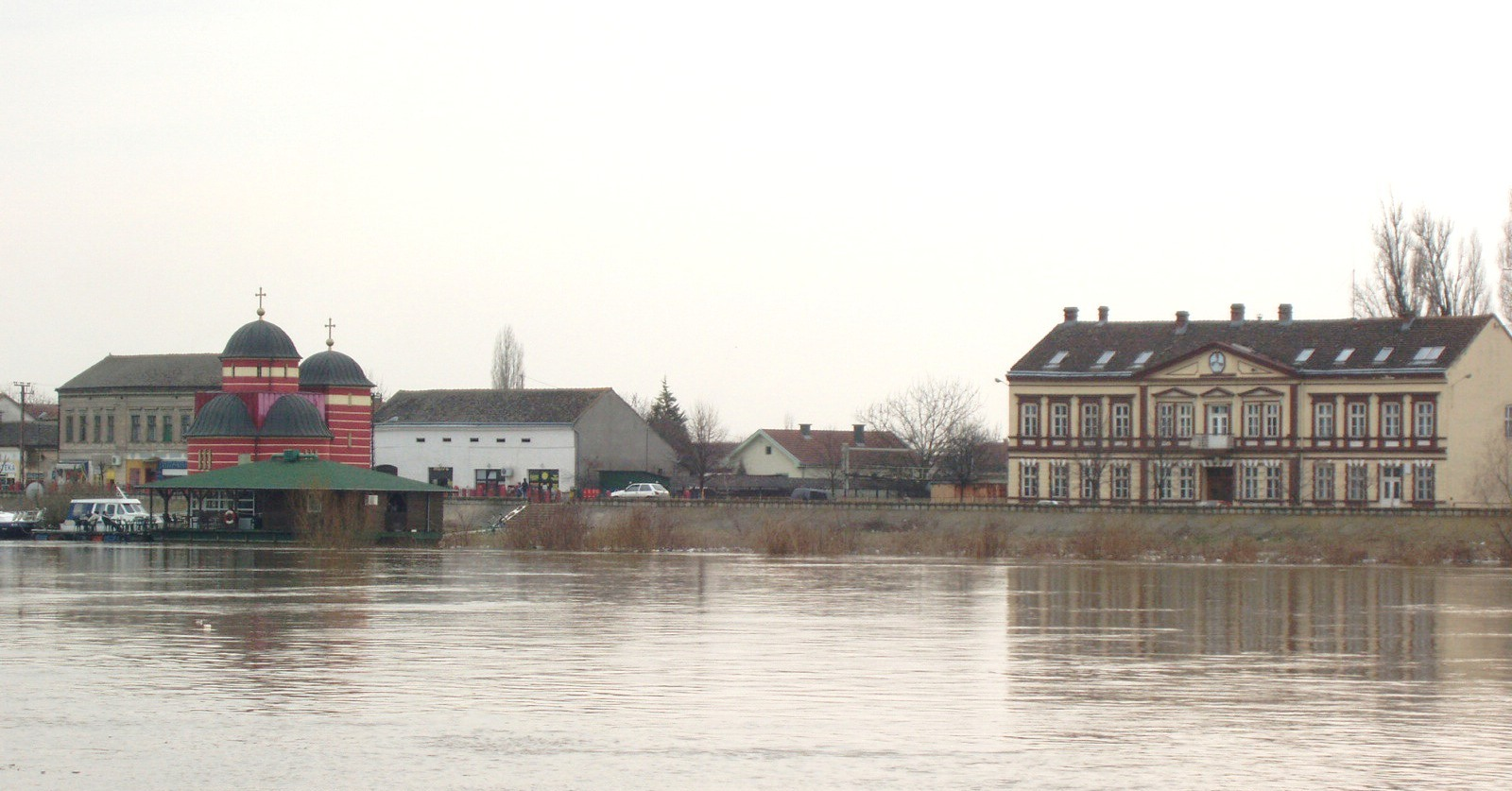
- View

- Location in Serbia Mačvanska Mitrovica (Serbia) Mačvanska Mitrovica (Europe)
- Coordinates: 44°57′56″N 19°35′53″E
- Country: Serbia
- Province: Vojvodina
- Region: Mačva
- District: Srem
- Municipality: Sremska Mitrovica

Area
  - Total: 2.4 km^{2} (0.93 sq mi)
- Elevation: 76 m (249 ft)

Population (2002)
  - Total: 3,873
  - Density: 1,623/km^{2} (4,200/sq mi)
- Postal code: 22202
- Area code: + 381(0)22

Mačvanska Mitrovica (Serbian Cyrillic: Мачванска Митровица, pronounced [mât͡ʃv̞anskaː mîtrɔv̞it͡sa]) is a town located in the Sremska Mitrovica municipality, in the Srem District of Serbia. It is situated in the Autonomous Province of Vojvodina. The town has a Serb ethnic majority and its population numbering 3,873 people (2011 census).

== Name ==
Its name means "Mitrovica of Mačva" (Mitrovica of Srem and Mitrovica of Kosovo also exist). In Serbian, the town is known as Mačvanska Mitrovica (Мачванска Митровица), in Croatian as Mačvanska Mitrovica, and in Hungarian as Szenternye. Other Serbian names used for the town include Srpska Mitrovica (Српска Митровица), Mala Mitrovica (Мала Митровица), and Mitrovica (Митровица).

== Geography ==
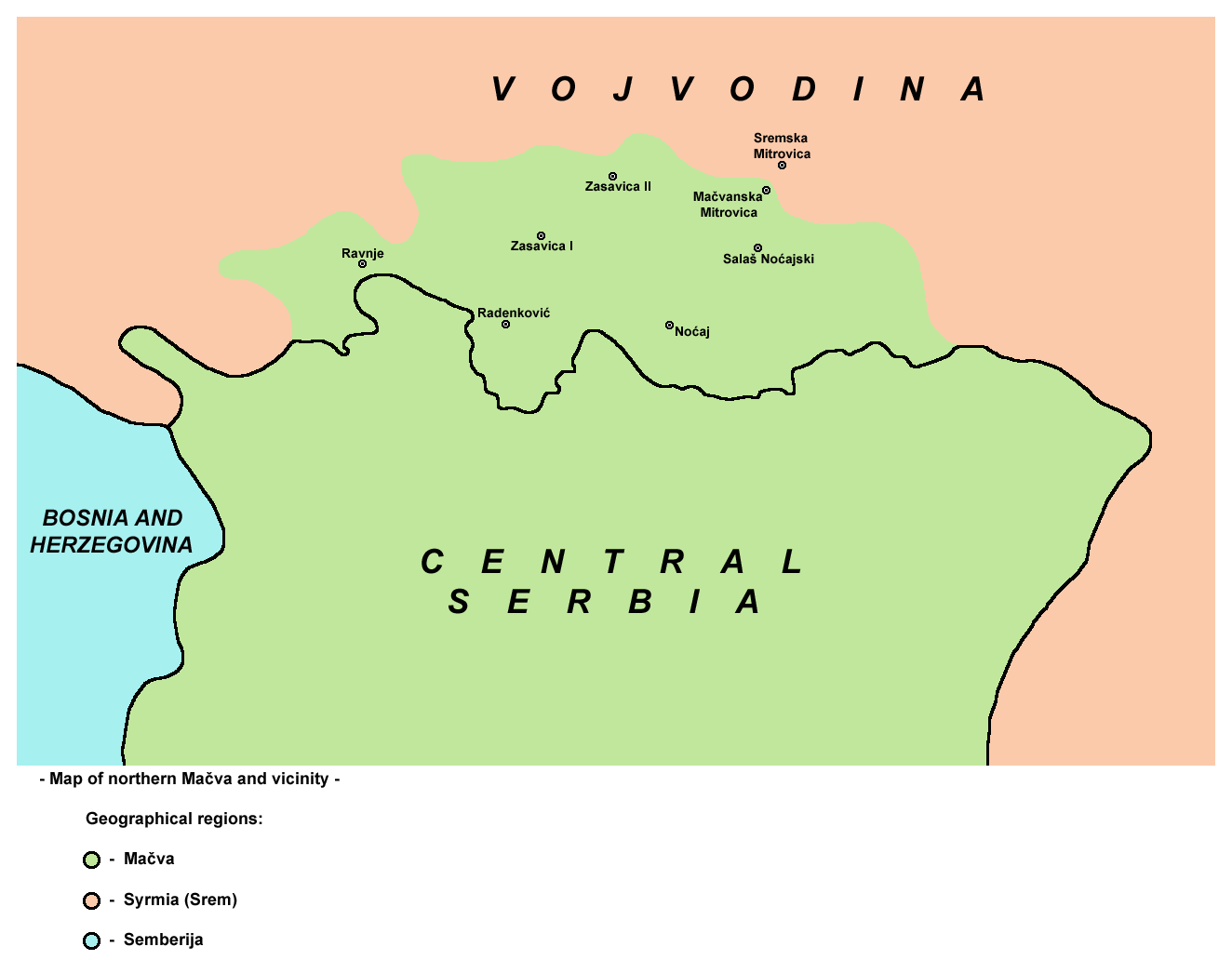
Mačvanska Mitrovica and neighbouring villages - territory of former Mačvanska Mitrovica municipality

Together with the neighbouring villages of Noćaj, Salaš Noćajski, Radenković, Ravnje and Zasavica II, the town of Mačvanska Mitrovica is the only town in Vojvodina located in the Mačva region, i.e. on the right bank of the river Sava, and thus on the Balkan Peninsula.

== Notable residents ==
- Former professional footballer Nikola Budišić was born in the town

== Demographics ==
Ethnic groups (2002 census):

- Serbs = 3,621
- Romani = 87
- Croats = 21
- Yugoslavs = 14
- Hungarians = 10
- others.

== Historical population ==
- 1921: 220
- 1931: 567
- 1948: 705
- 1953: 869
- 1961: 1,408
- 1971: 3,357
- 1981: 3,661
- 1991: 3,788
- 2002: 3,896

== See also ==
- List of places in Serbia
- List of cities, towns and villages in Vojvodina
