= Nikola Budišić =

Serbian footballer

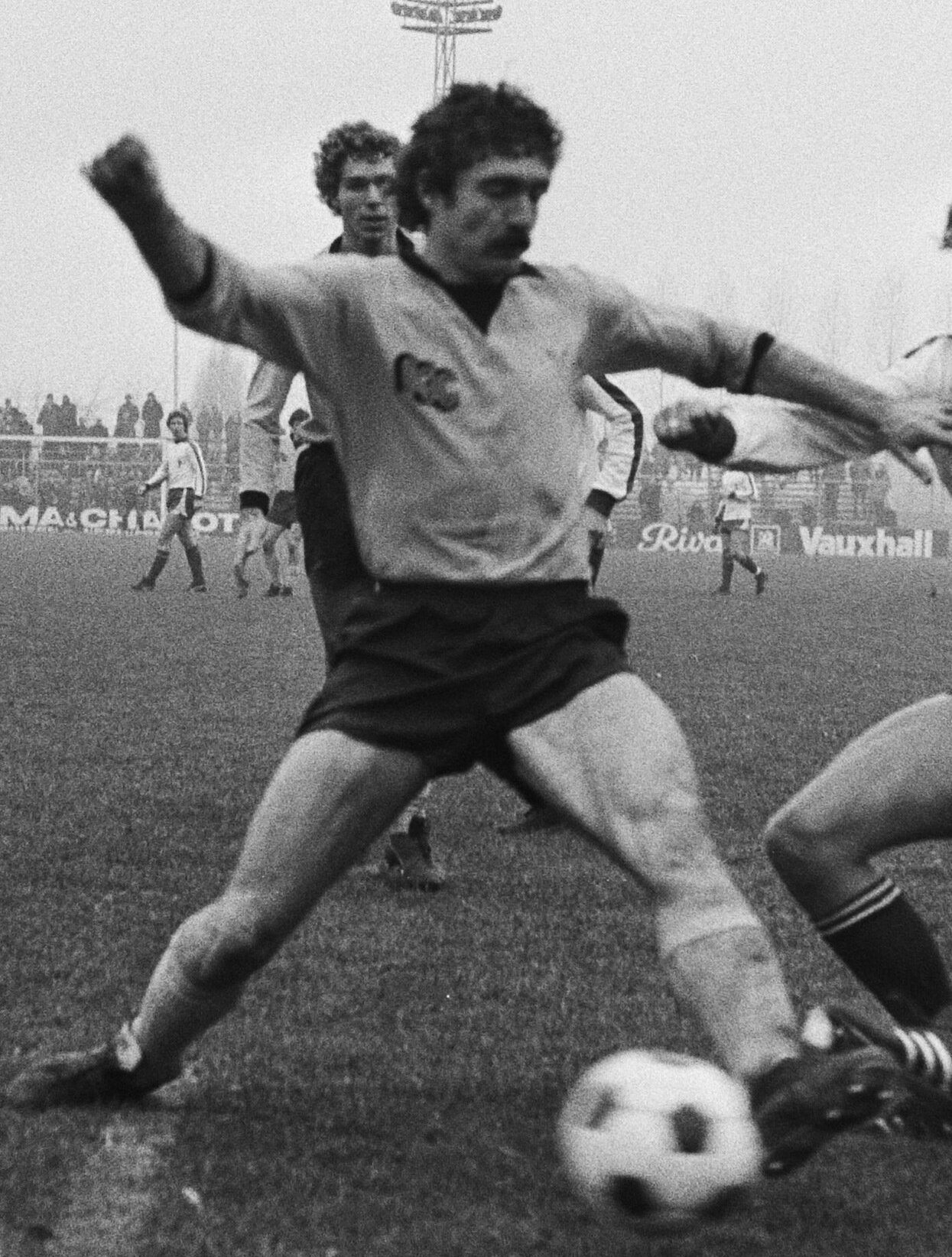
- Budišić with NAC in 1976

Personal information
- Date of birth: 12 October 1947 (age 79)
- Place of birth: Mačvanska Mitrovica, FPR Yugoslavia
- Height: 1.85 m (6 ft 1 in)
- Position: Defender

Youth career
- 1960–1965: Radnički Belgrade
- 1965–1967: Partizan

Senior career*
Years	Team	Apps	(Gls)
1967–1974	Partizan	127	(0)
1974–1975	Panathinaikos	8	(0)
1975–1979	NAC	128	(4)
1979–1981	Beringen	27	(2)
Total		290	(6)

International career
1961–1965	Yugoslavia U20		
- Yugoslavia U21
- * Club domestic league appearances and goals

Nikola Budišić (Serbian Cyrillic: Никола Будишић; born 12 October 1947) is a Serbian retired professional footballer who played as a defender, most notably with FK Partizan. In total, he appeared in 348 matches for Partizan (127 domestic league outings).

== Career ==
He was one of the first foreign players of Panathinaikos after the fall of the Greek military junta in 1974. Budišić joined Eredivisie side NAC in 1975 from Partizan for 100 thousand Dutch guilders and quickly impressed local powerhouses Feyenoord and Ajax, but remained loyal to the Breda club before moving south to join Belgian side Beringen four years later.

Today he is head of the Ajax Football School in Sremska Mitrovica and lives in Laćarak.
