= Majur (Šabac) =

Majur Мајур (Serbian)
- Village (Selo)
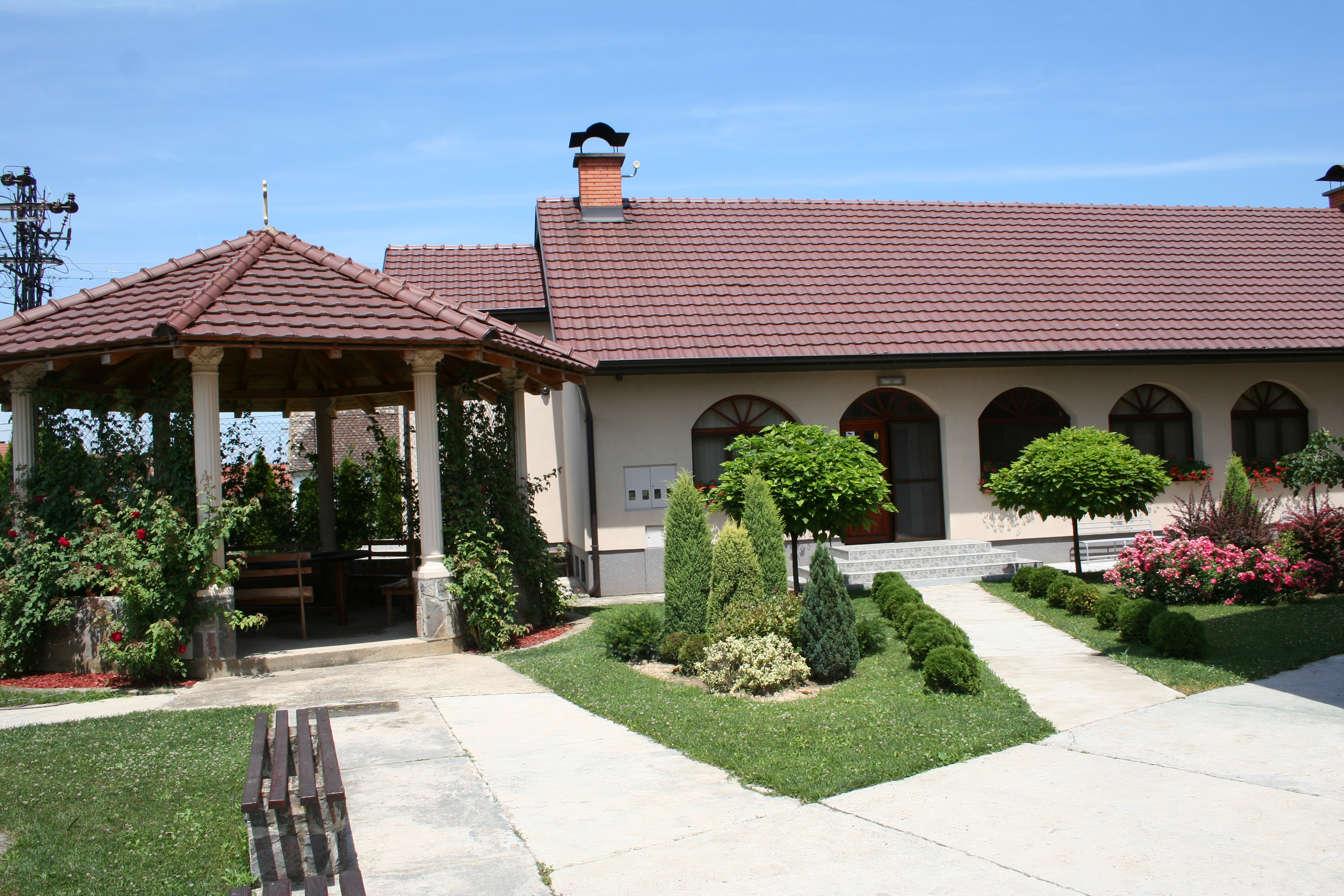

- Location within Serbia
- Coordinates: 44°46′11″N 19°39′16″E
- Country: Serbia
- Statistical Region: Šumadija and Western Serbia
- Region: Mačva
- District: Mačva District
- Municipality: Šabac

Area
  - Total: 20.27 km^{2} (7.83 sq mi)
- Elevation: 65 m (213 ft)

Population (2011)
  - Total: 7,031
  - Density: 346.9/km^{2} (898.4/sq mi)
- Time zone: UTC+1 (CET)
  - Summer (DST): UTC+2 (CEST)

Majur (Serbian Cyrillic: Мајур, pronounced [mâjuːr]) is a village located in the municipality of Šabac, Serbia. The village has a Serb ethnic majority and its population numbered 7,031 inhabitants as of 2011 census.

== See also ==
- List of places in Serbia
- Mačva
