= Zasavica I =

Zasavica I Засавица I (Serbian)
- Village (Selo)
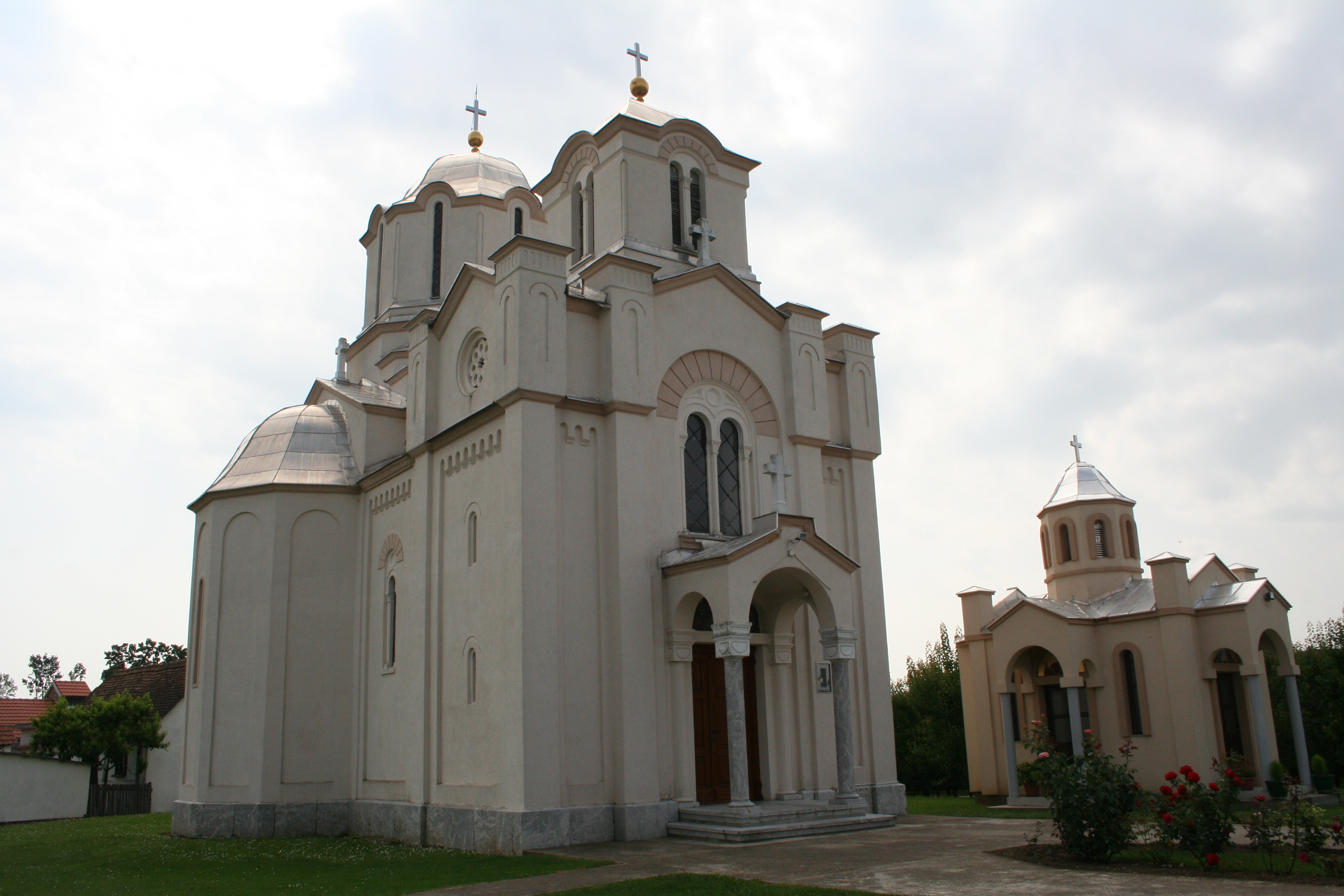
- Church of Holy Trinity in village center (1799)

- Location within Vojvodina Location within Serbia Location within Europe
- Coordinates: 44.952°N 19.503°E
- Country: Serbia
- Province: Vojvodina
- Region: Mačva
- District: Srem
- Municipality: Sremska Mitrovica

Population (2011)
  - Total: 772
- Time zone: UTC+1 (CET)
  - Summer (DST): UTC+2 (CEST)

Zasavica I (Serbian Cyrillic: Засавица I), also known as Zasavica (Засавица) or Gornja Zasavica (Горња Засавица), is a village in the Sremska Mitrovica municipality, in Serbian province of Vojvodina. The village has a Serb ethnic majority and its population numbering 772 people (2011 census).

== Geography ==
The village is located 12 km south-west of Sremska Mitrovica, on the river Zasavica. Although part of the Srem District, Zasavica I is situated in the region of Mačva south of the Sava river. It is one of several settlements in the northern section of the region of Mačva which were administratively included into the province of Vojvodina when it was created in 1945. With the adjacent village of Zasavica II (Donja Zasavica), it still forms a single cadastral unit, although they are treated as separate villages for census purposes.

== Gallery ==
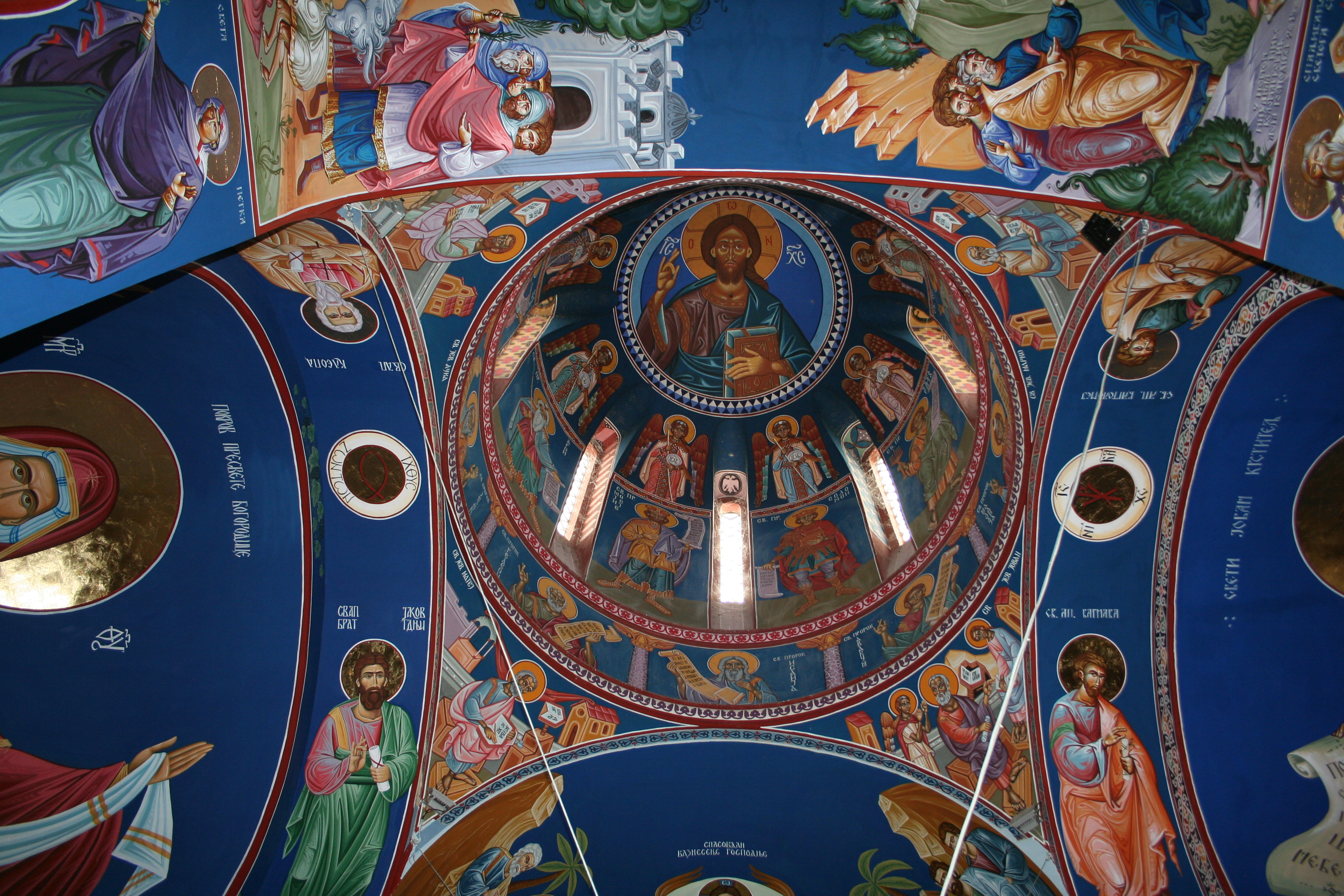

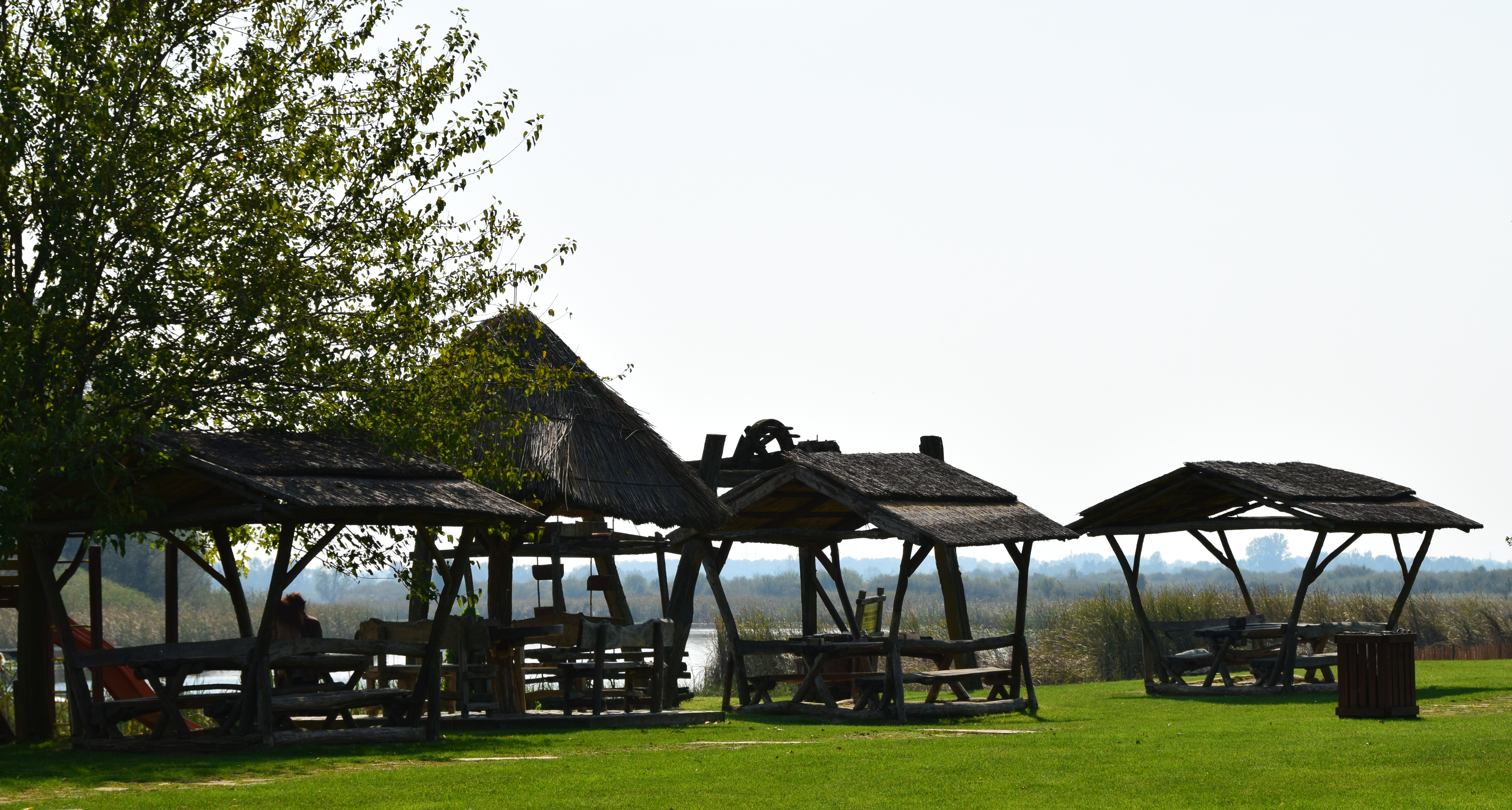

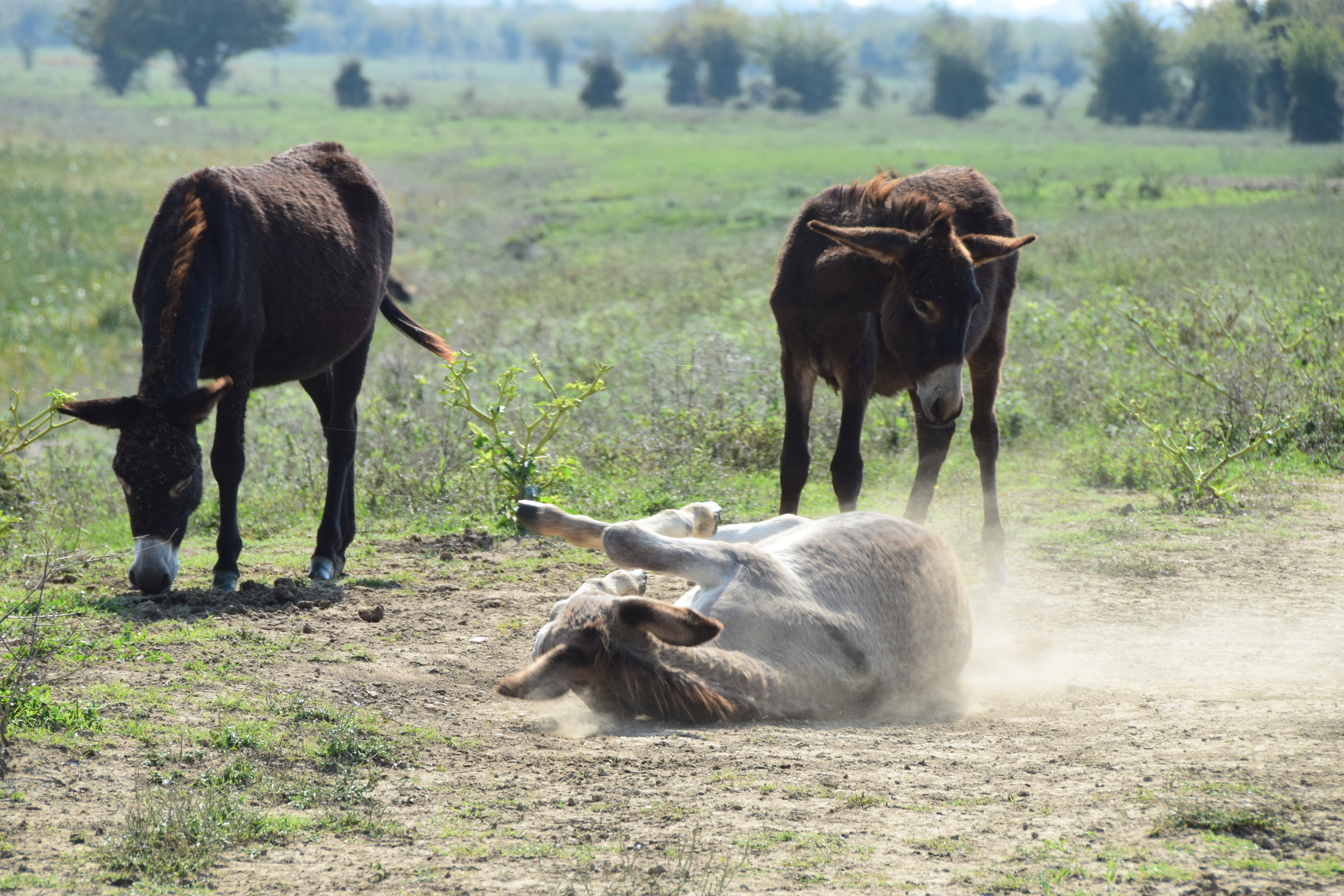

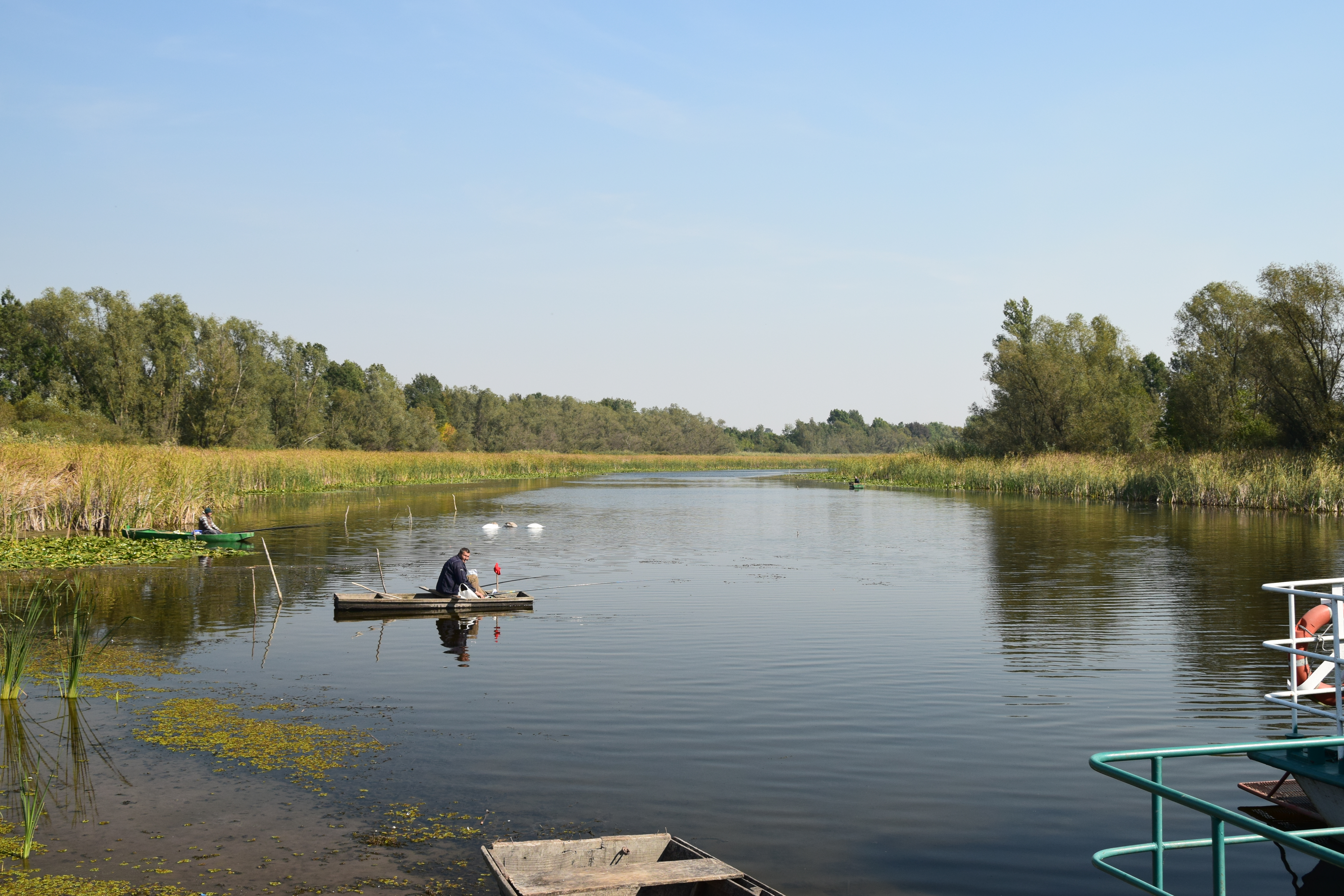

== Historical population ==
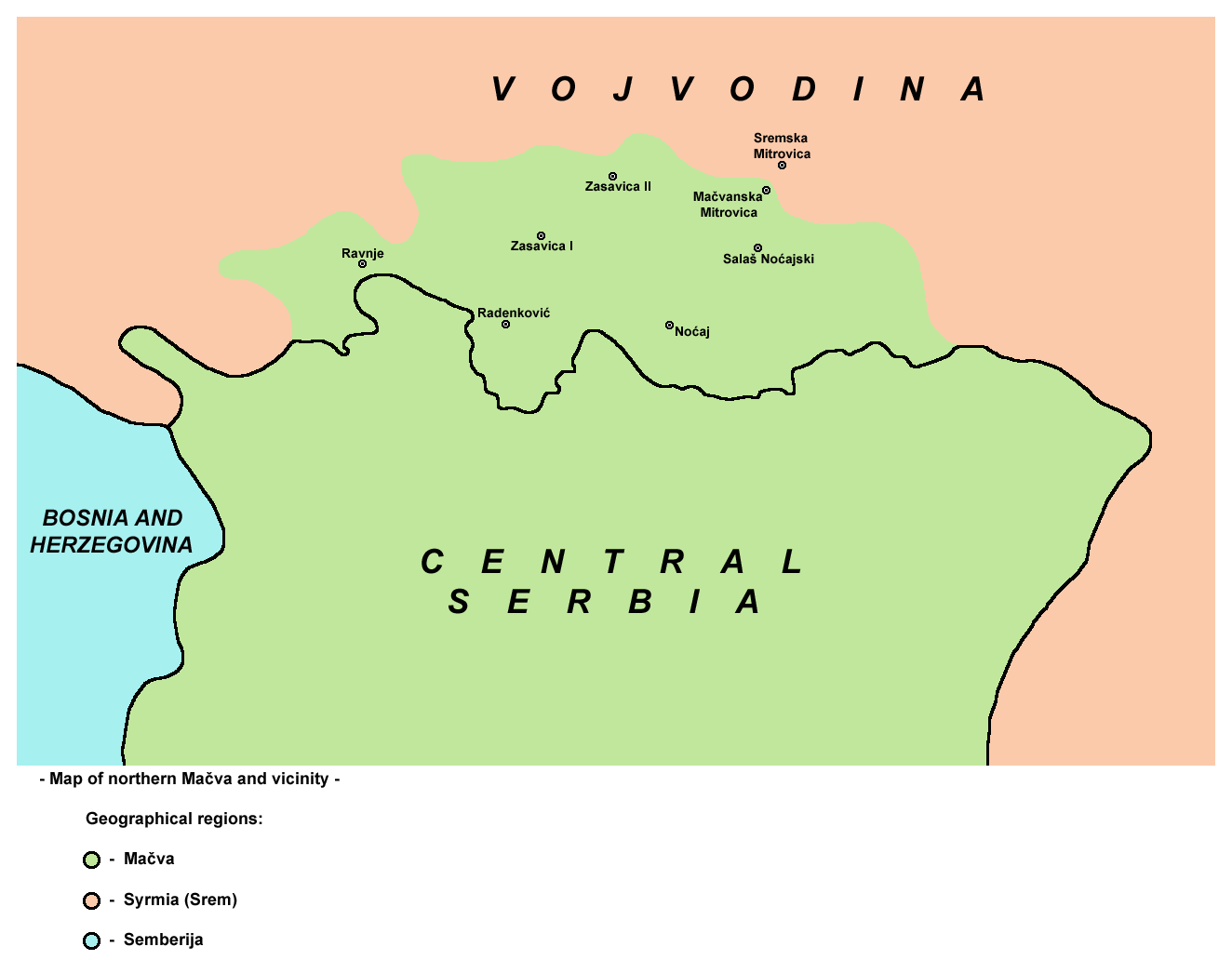
Location map of Zasavica I and northern part of the Mačva region

- 1961: 1,775
- 1971: 1,673
- 1981: 924
- 1991: 864
- 2002: 836
- 2011: 772

== See also ==
- List of cities, towns and villages in Vojvodina
