= Ravnje (Valjevo) =

Ravnje Равње
- Village
- Location within Serbia
- Coordinates: 44°12′N 19°54′E
- Country: Serbia
- District: Kolubara District
- Municipality: Valjevo

Population (2002)
  - Total: 245
- Time zone: UTC+1 (CET)
  - Summer (DST): UTC+2 (CEST)

Ravnje is a village in the municipality of Valjevo, Serbia. According to the 2002 census, the village has a population of 245 people.

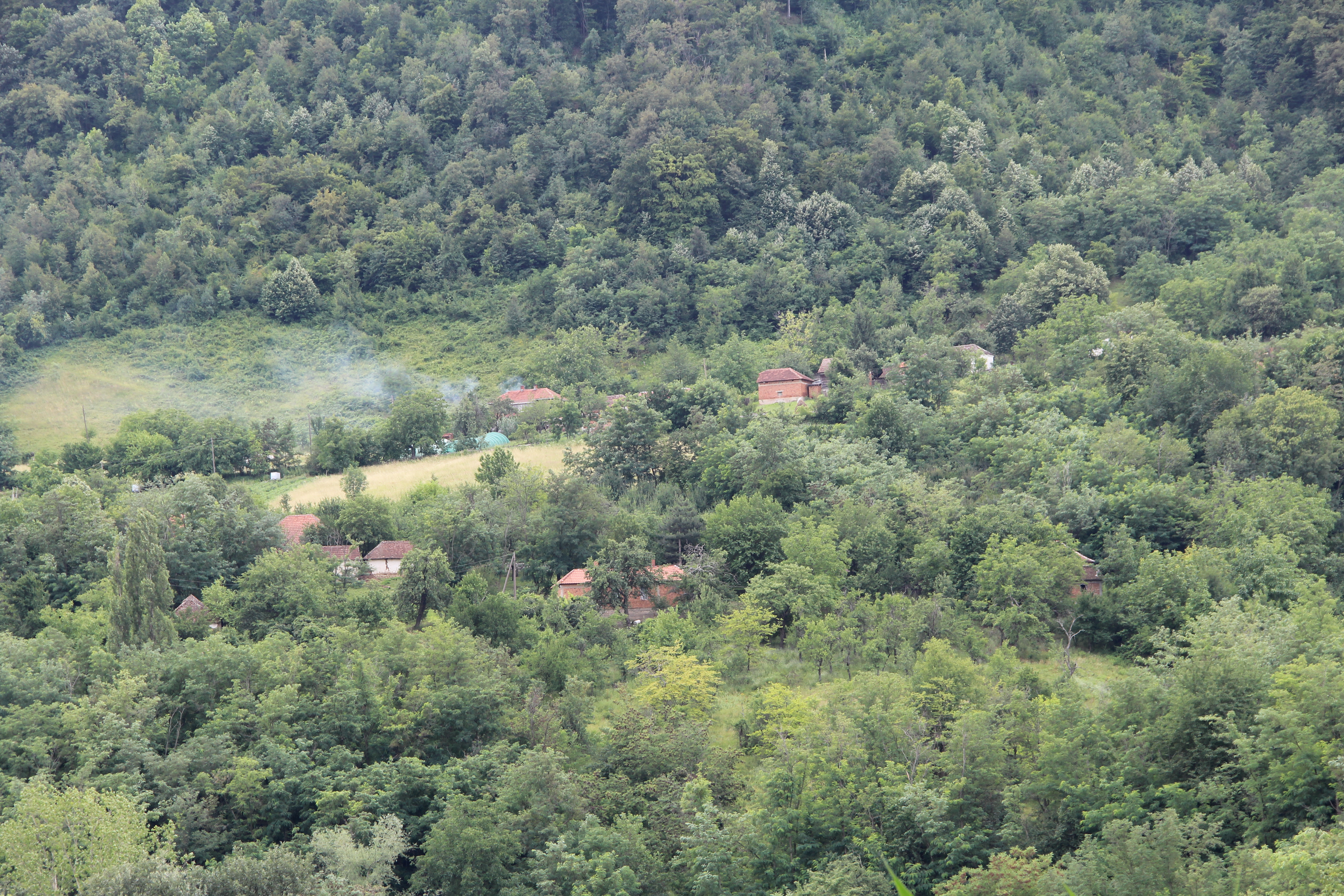
Ravnje - panorama

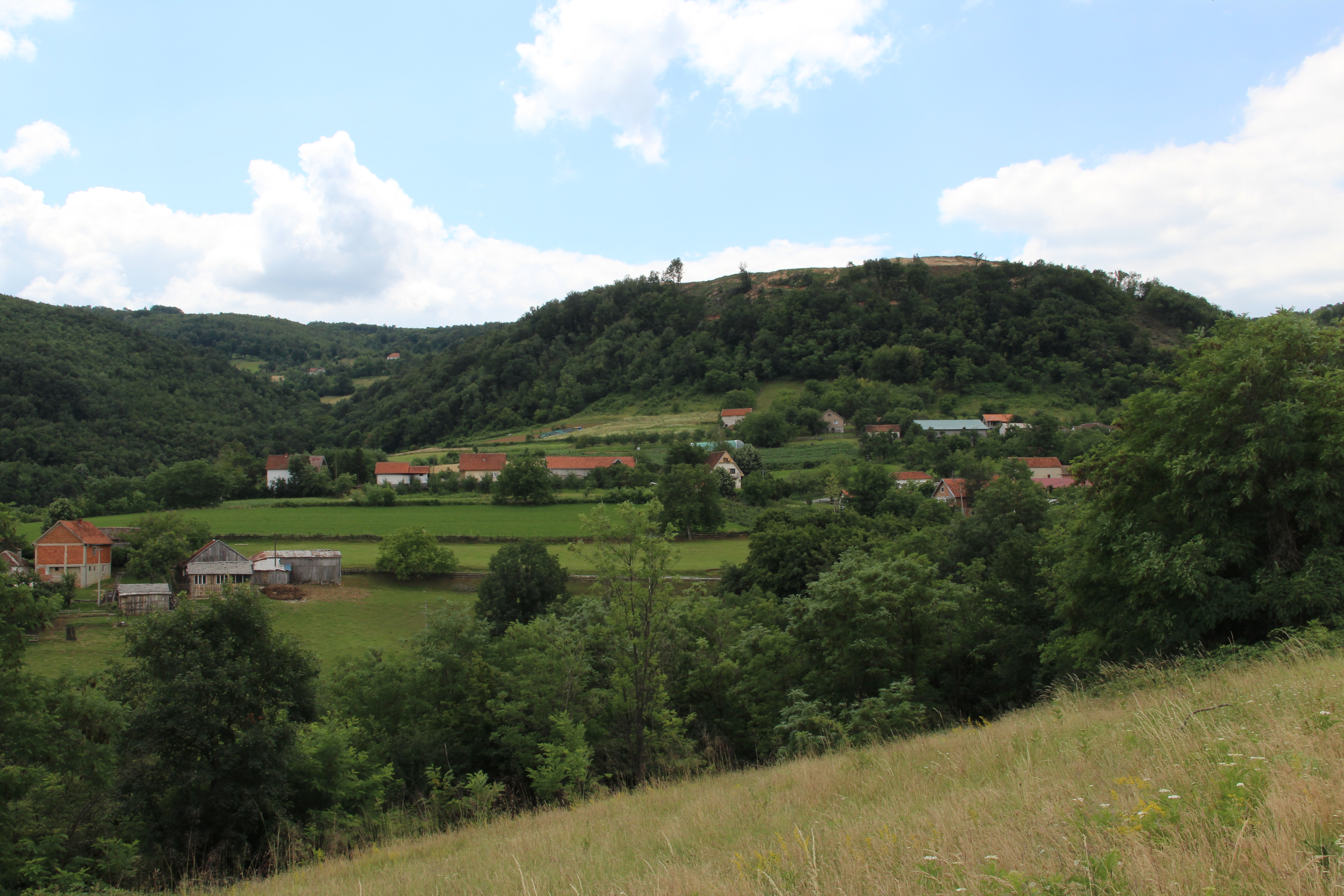
Ravnje - panorama

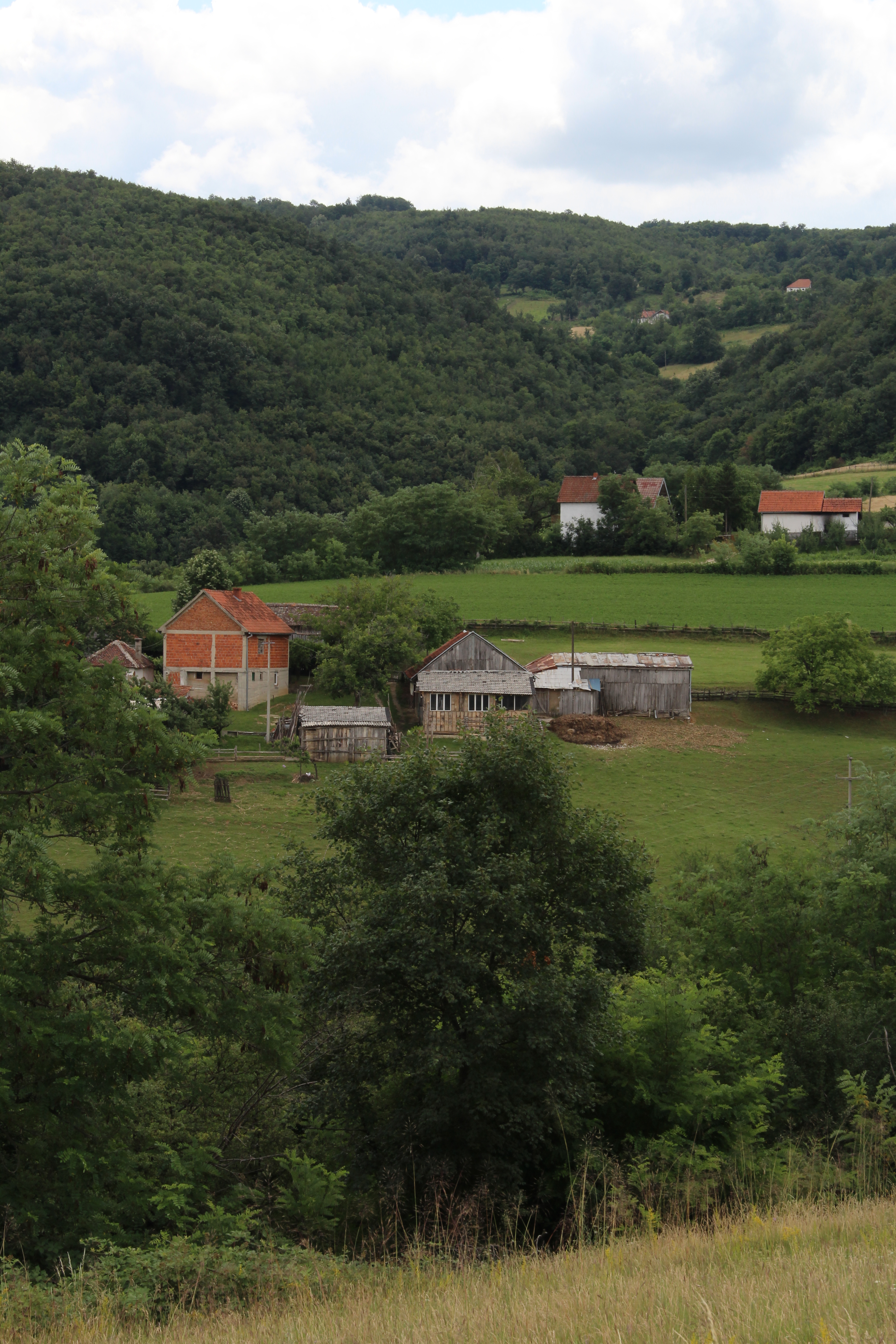
Ravnje - panorama

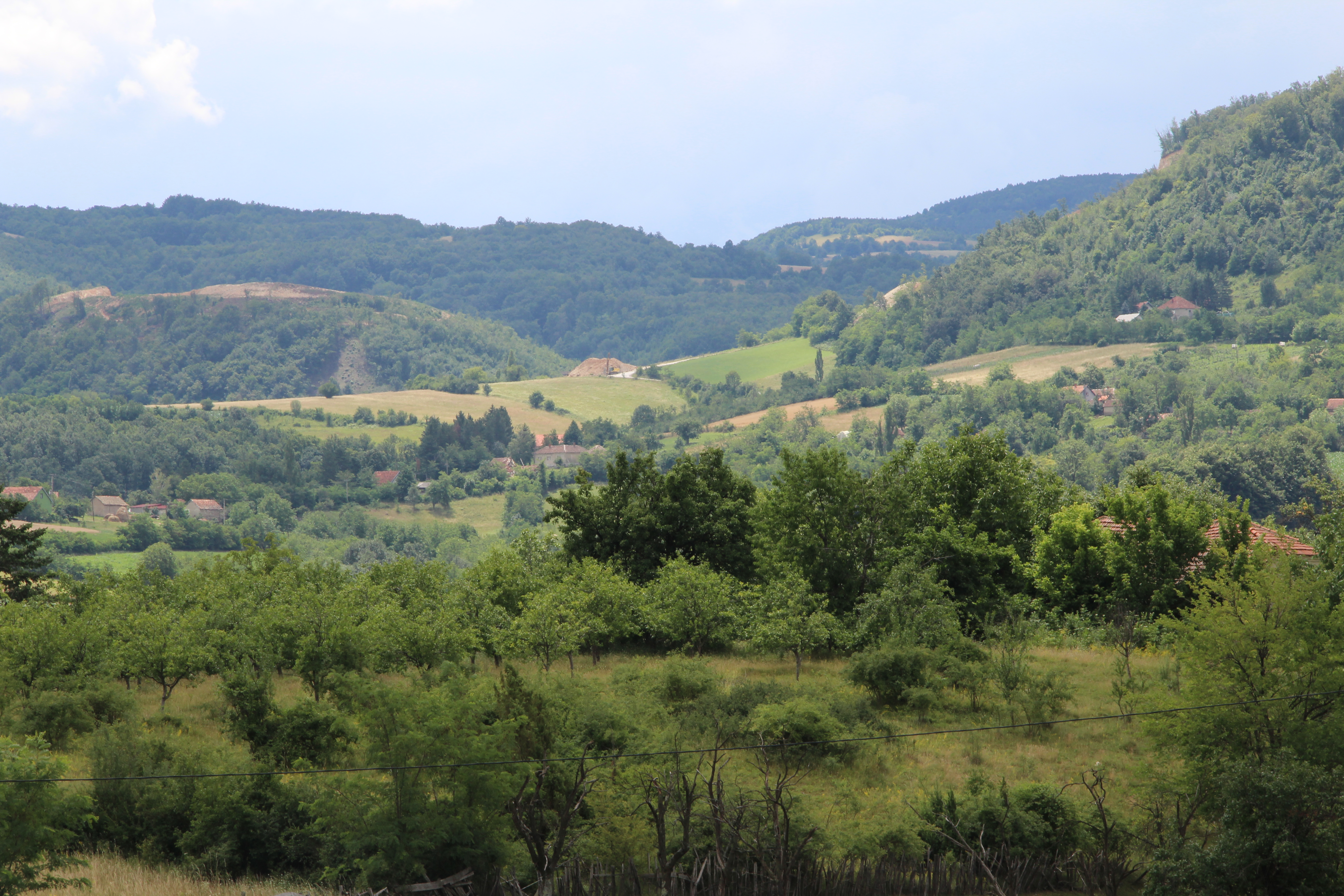
Ravnje - panorama

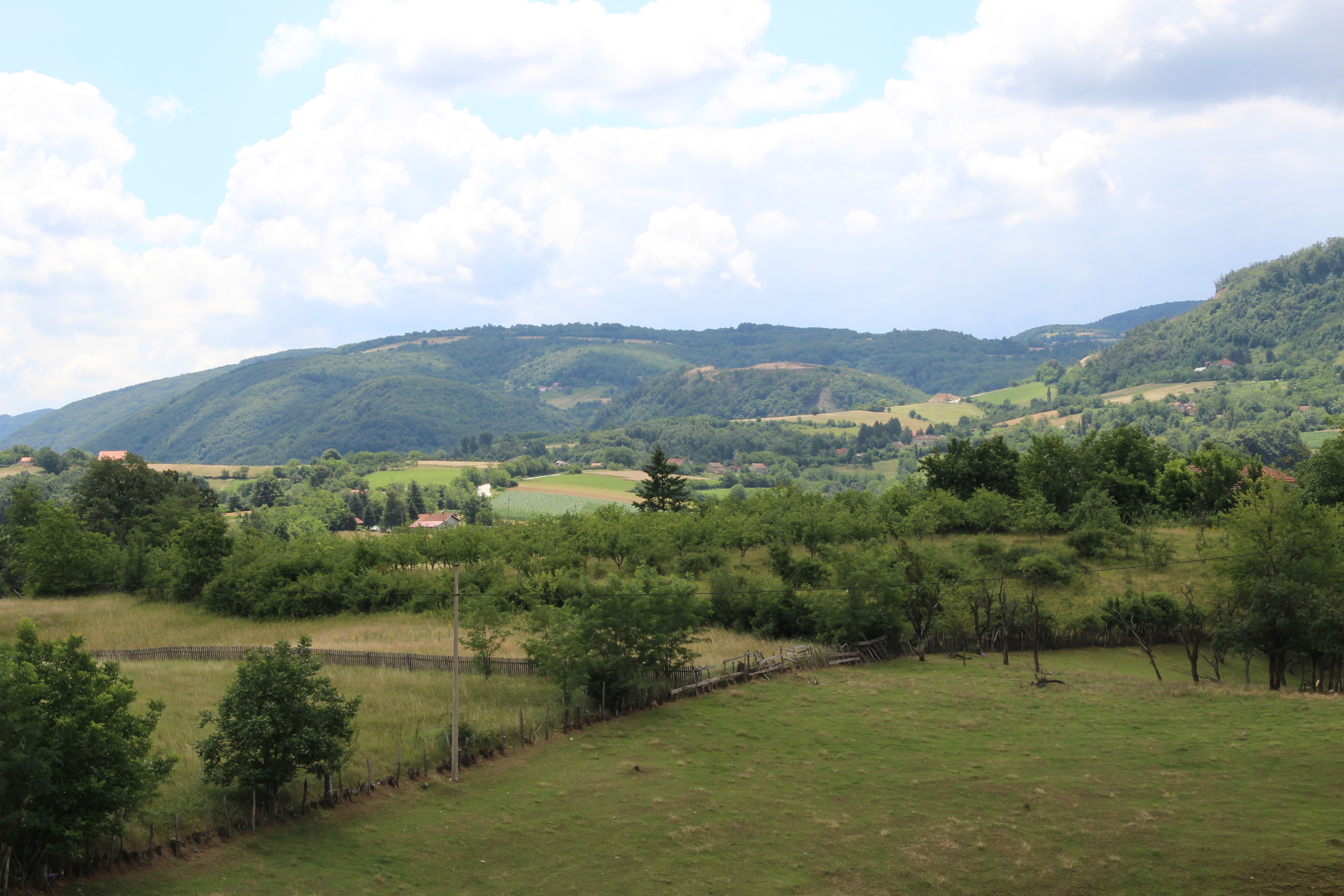
Ravnje - panorama

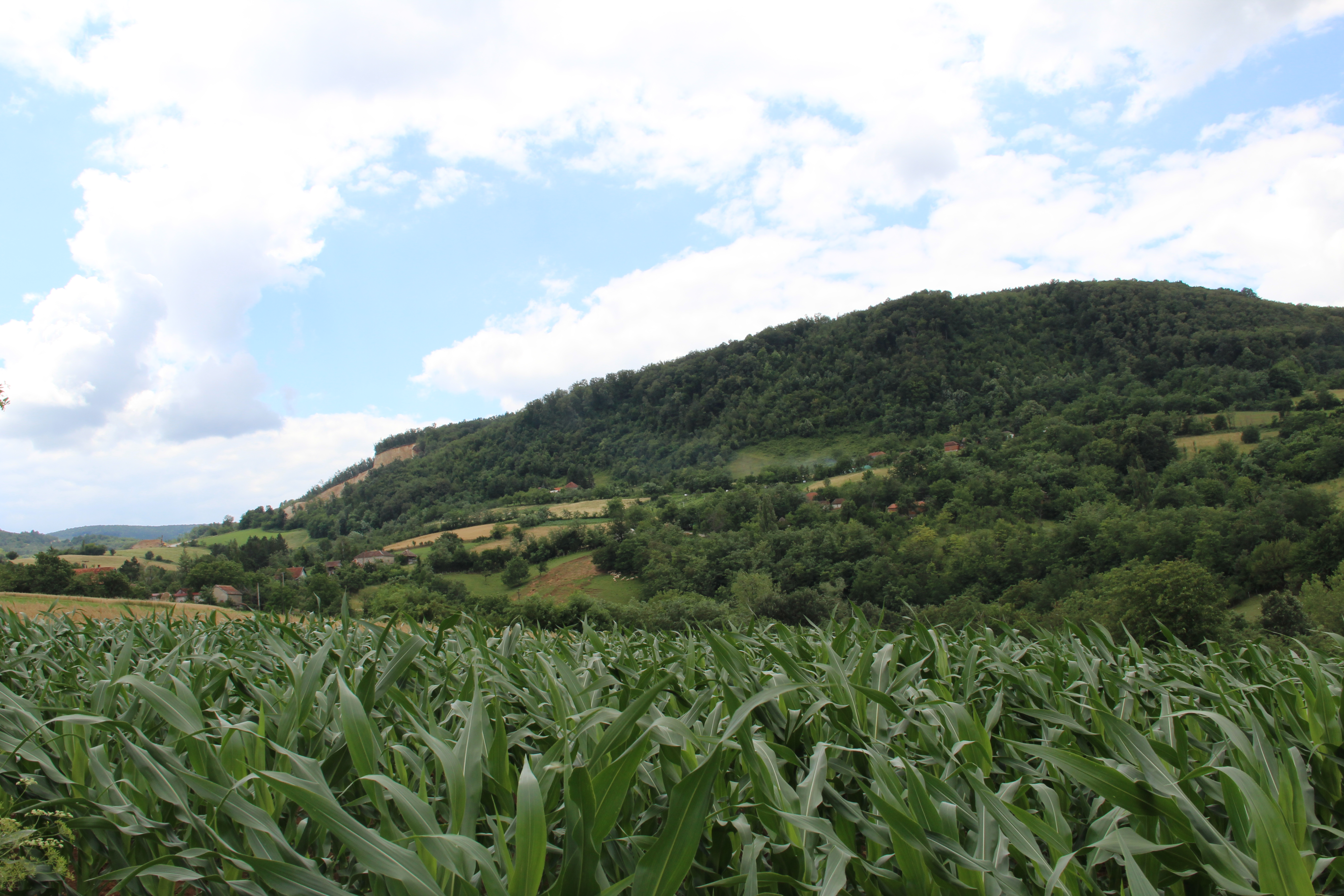
Ravnje - panorama

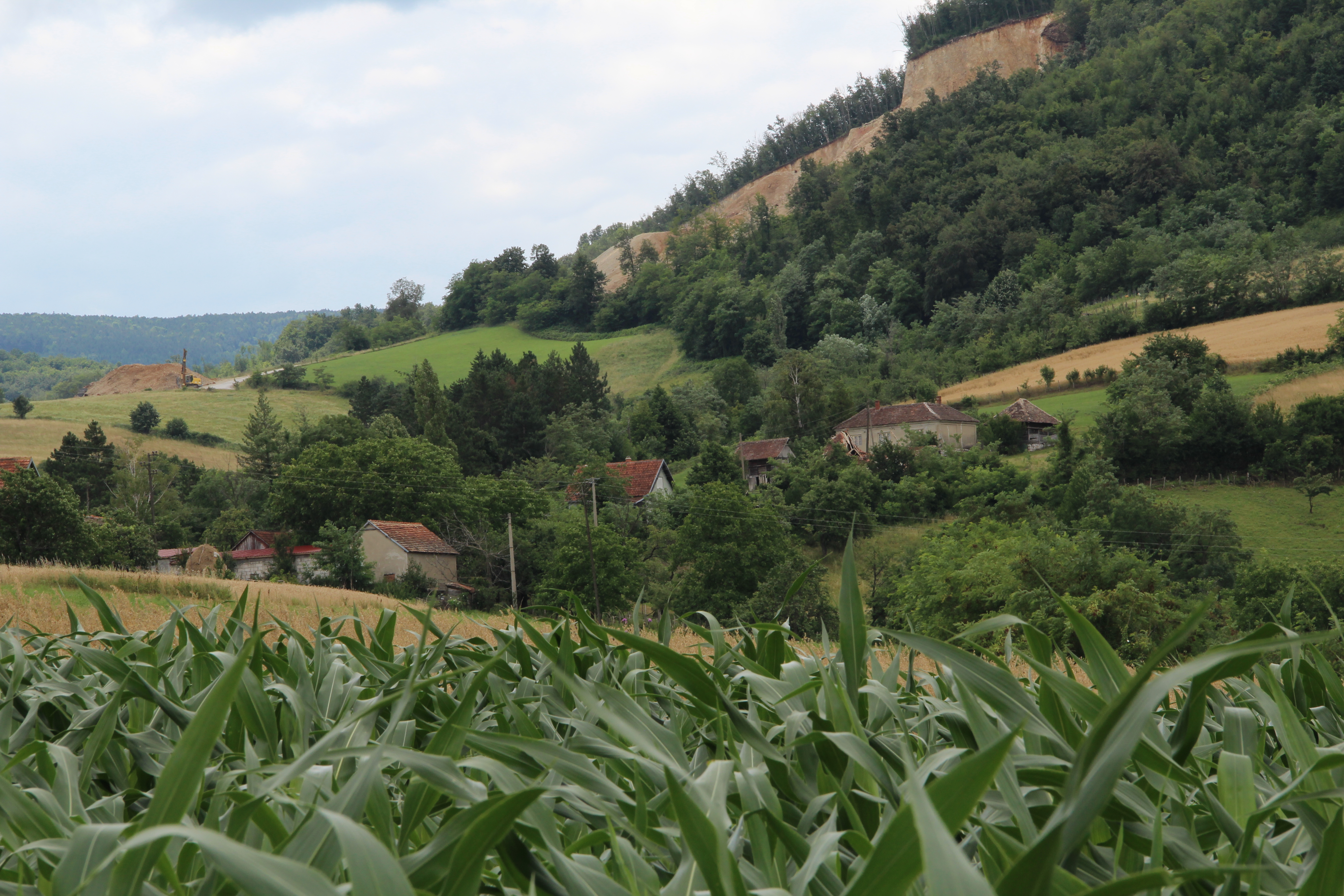
Ravnje - panorama

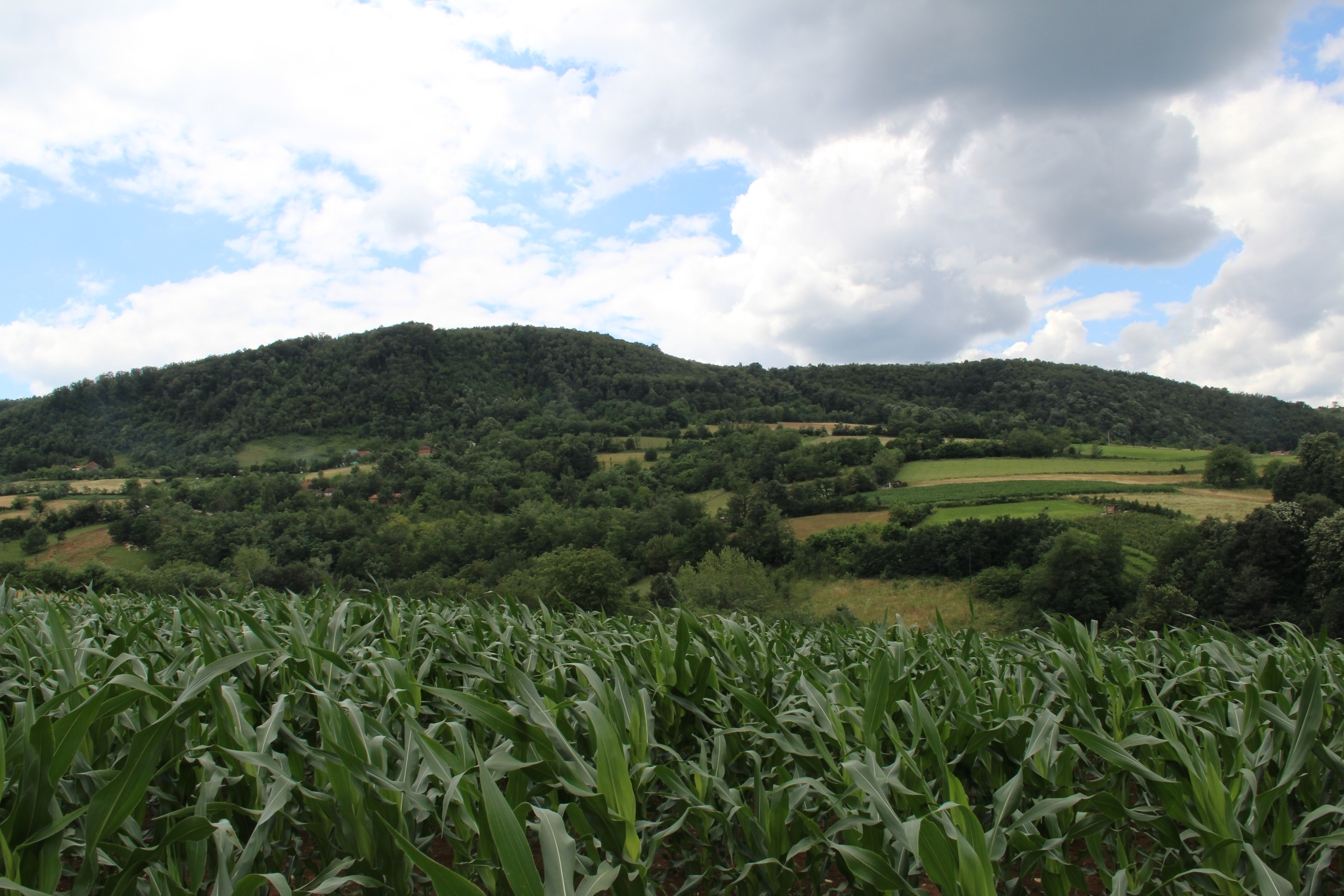
Ravnje - panorama
