= Ravnje (Sremska Mitrovica) =

Ravnje Равње (Serbian)
- Village (Selo)
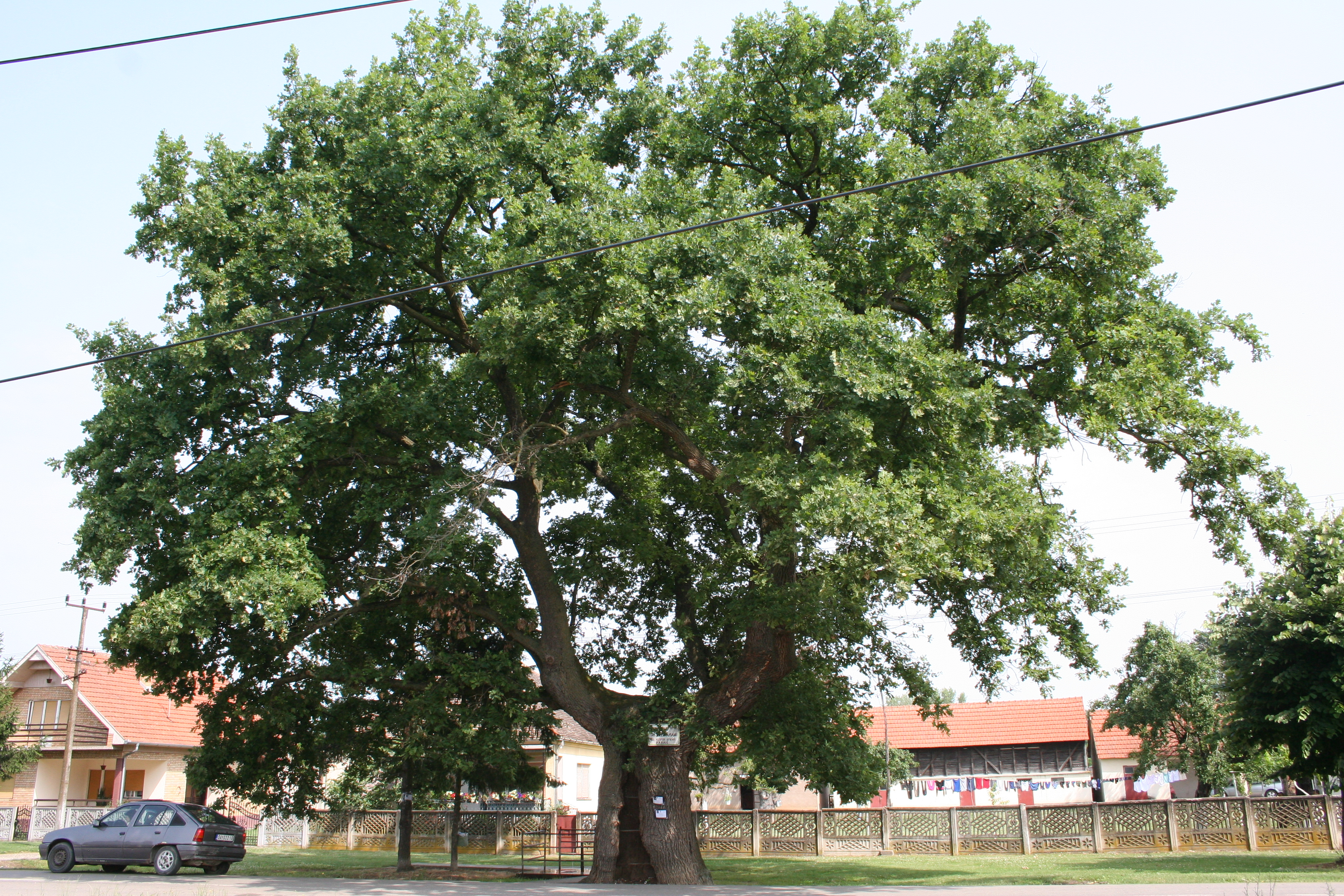

- Location within Vojvodina Location within Serbia Location within Europe
- Coordinates: 44°56′37″N 19°25′18″E
- Country: Serbia
- Province: Vojvodina
- Region: Mačva
- District: Srem
- Municipality: Sremska Mitrovica

Population (2002)
  - Total: 1,463
- Time zone: UTC+1 (CET)
  - Summer (DST): UTC+2 (CEST)

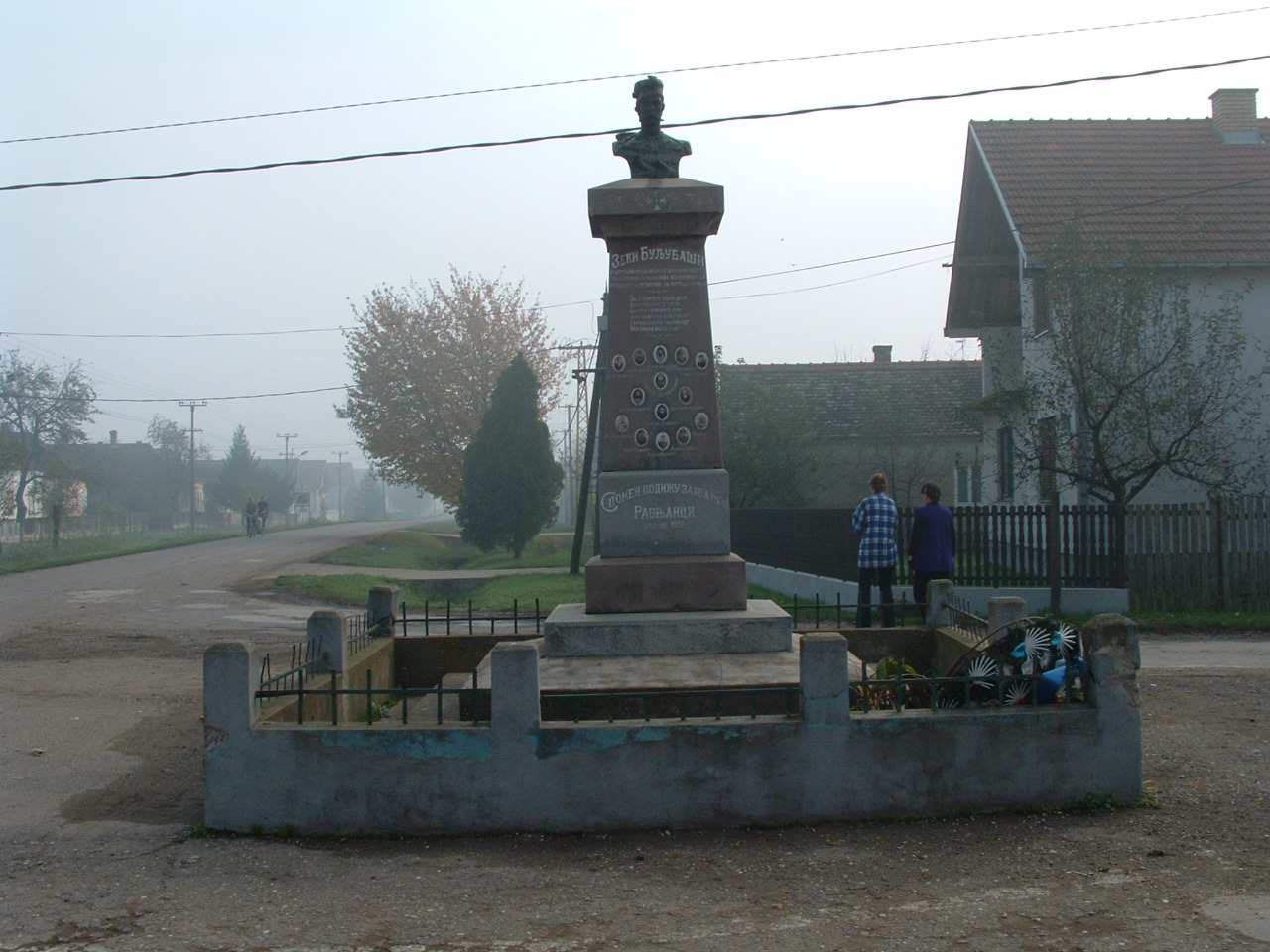
Monument to Zeka Buljubaša

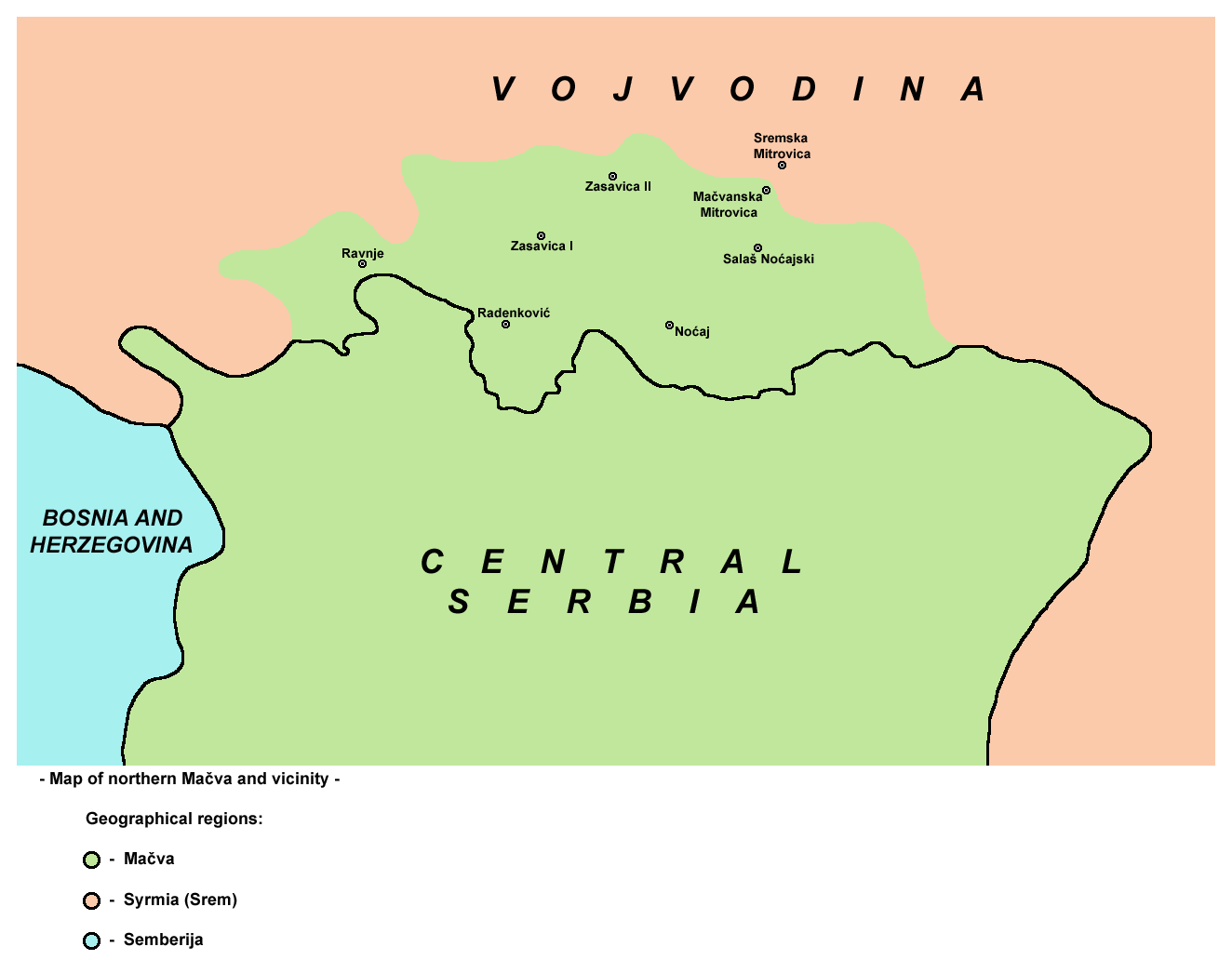
Location map of Ravnje and northern part of the Mačva region

Ravnje (Serbian: Равње) is a village in Serbia. It is located in the Sremska Mitrovica municipality, in the Srem District, Vojvodina province. The village has a Serb ethnic majority and its population numbering 1,413 people (2002 census). Although part of the Srem District, Ravnje is situated in the region of Mačva.

== Historical population ==
- 1961: 1,856
- 1971: 1,745
- 1981: 1,692
- 1991: 1,587

== See also ==
- List of places in Serbia
- List of cities, towns and villages in Vojvodina
