= Zasavica II =

Zasavica II Засавица II (Serbian)
- Village (Selo)
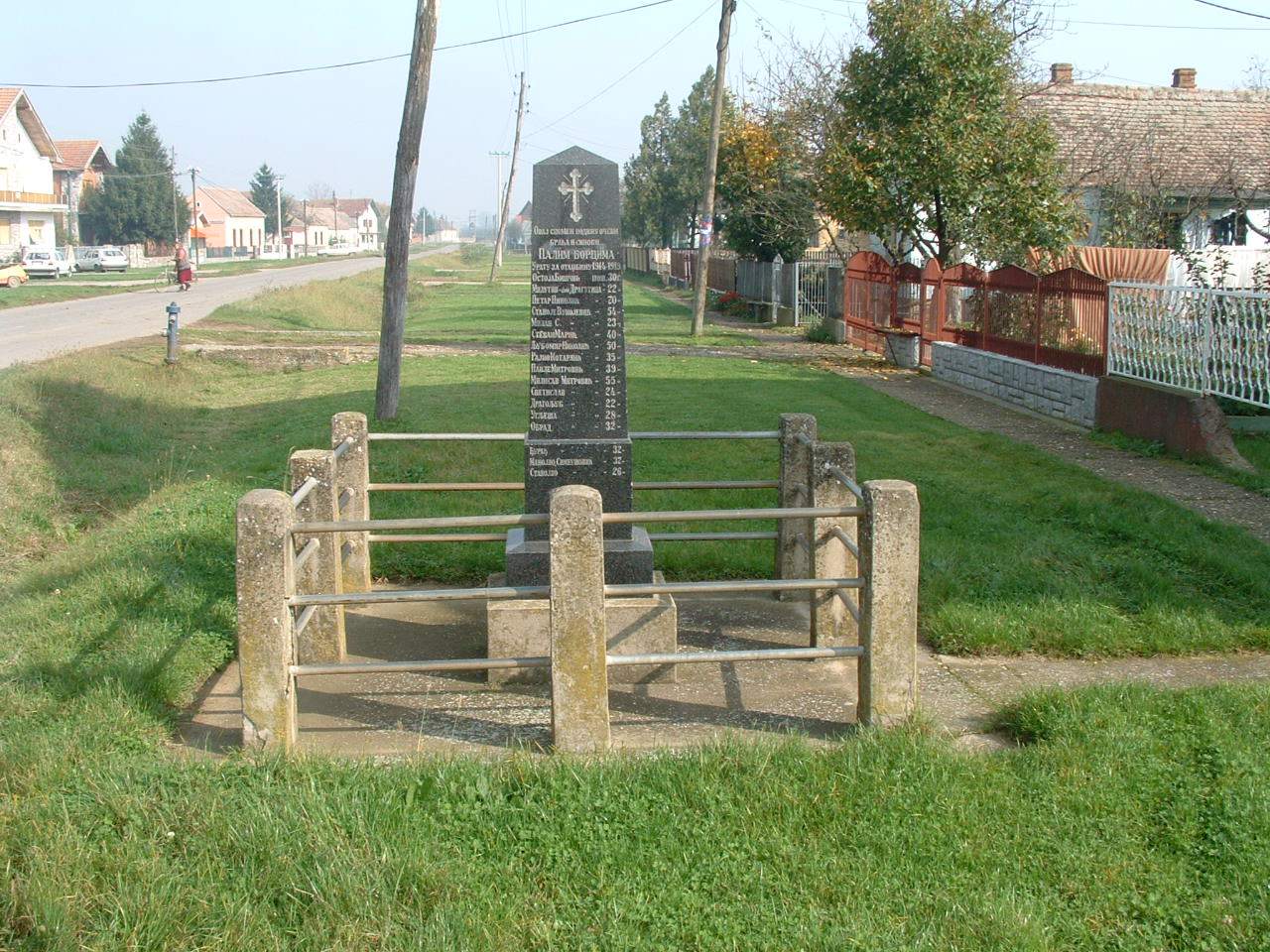

- Location within Vojvodina Location within Serbia Location within Europe
- Coordinates: 44°58′N 19°32′E
- Country: Serbia
- Province: Vojvodina
- Region: Mačva
- District: Srem
- Municipality: Sremska Mitrovica

Population (2011)
  - Total: 608
- Time zone: UTC+1 (CET)
  - Summer (DST): UTC+2 (CEST)

Zasavica II (Serbian Cyrillic: Засавица II), also known as Donja Zasavica (Доња Засавица), is a village in the Sremska Mitrovica municipality, in the Vojvodina province of Serbia. The village has a Serb ethnic majority and its population numbering 608 people (2011 census). Although part of the Srem District, Zasavica II is situated in the region of Mačva south of the Sava river. With the adjacent village of Zasavica I (Gornja Zasavica), it still forms a single cadastral unit, although they are treated as separate villages for census purposes.

== Historical population ==
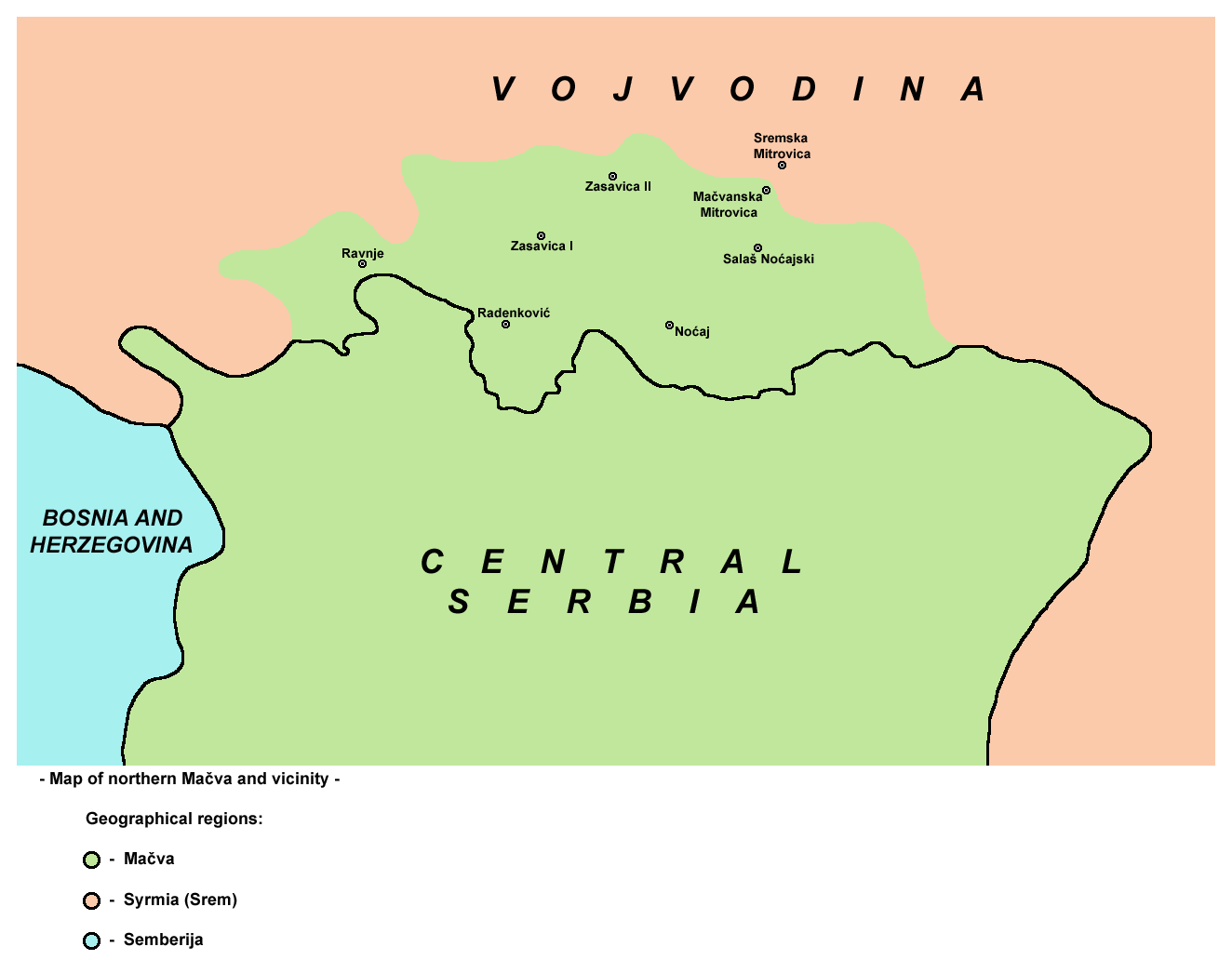
Location map of Zasavica II and northern part of the Mačva region

- 1981: 767
- 1991: 750
- 2002: 707
- 2011: 608

== See also ==
- List of places in Serbia
- List of cities, towns and villages in Vojvodina
