= Mačva =

Historical and geographical region in Serbia

Mačva Мачва
- Historical and geographical region of Serbia
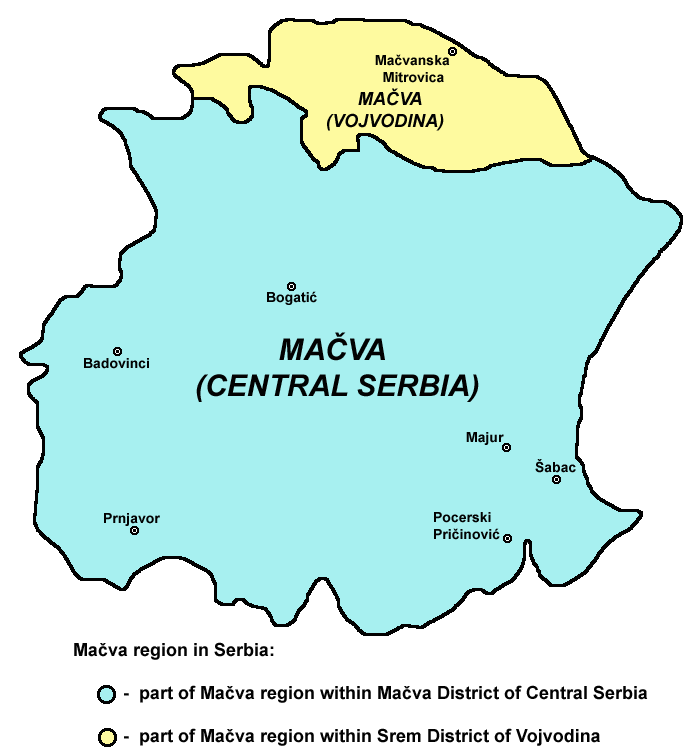
- Country: Serbia
- Largest city: Šabac

Population
  - Total: c. 130,000

Mačva (Serbian Cyrillic: Мачва, pronounced [mâːt͡ʃv̞a]) is a geographical and historical region in western Serbia, on a fertile plain between the Sava and Drina rivers. A small part of Mačva is located in the Vojvodina province. Šabac is the largest town of the region.

== Etymology ==
The region is named after a town of Mačva, which existed in the Middle Ages near the river Sava. In the past, the region was also known as Lower Syrmia, while the neighbouring region on the northern bank of the Sava river (present-day Syrmia) was known as Upper Syrmia.

== History ==
Mačva was inhabited since the Stone Age. Before the Roman conquest, the region was inhabited by Illyrians and Celtic Scordisces. In the first century BC, the region was conquered by the Romans, and Scordisces were pushed to the northern side of the Sava river. During the Roman rule, the region was part of the provinces of Moesia and Pannonia.

Roman rule lasted until the 5th century, and the region was conquered by the Sarmatians, Huns, Goths, Gepids, Lombards and Avars. In the 6th century, Slavic tribes settled in the region.

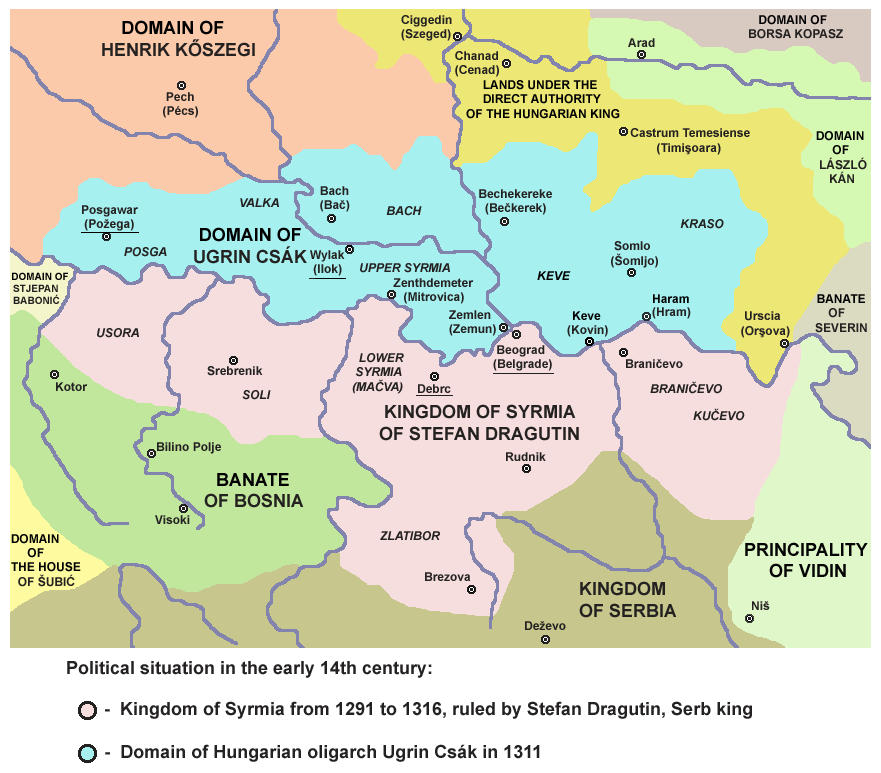
Kingdom of Syrmia of Stefan Dragutin, 1291–1316

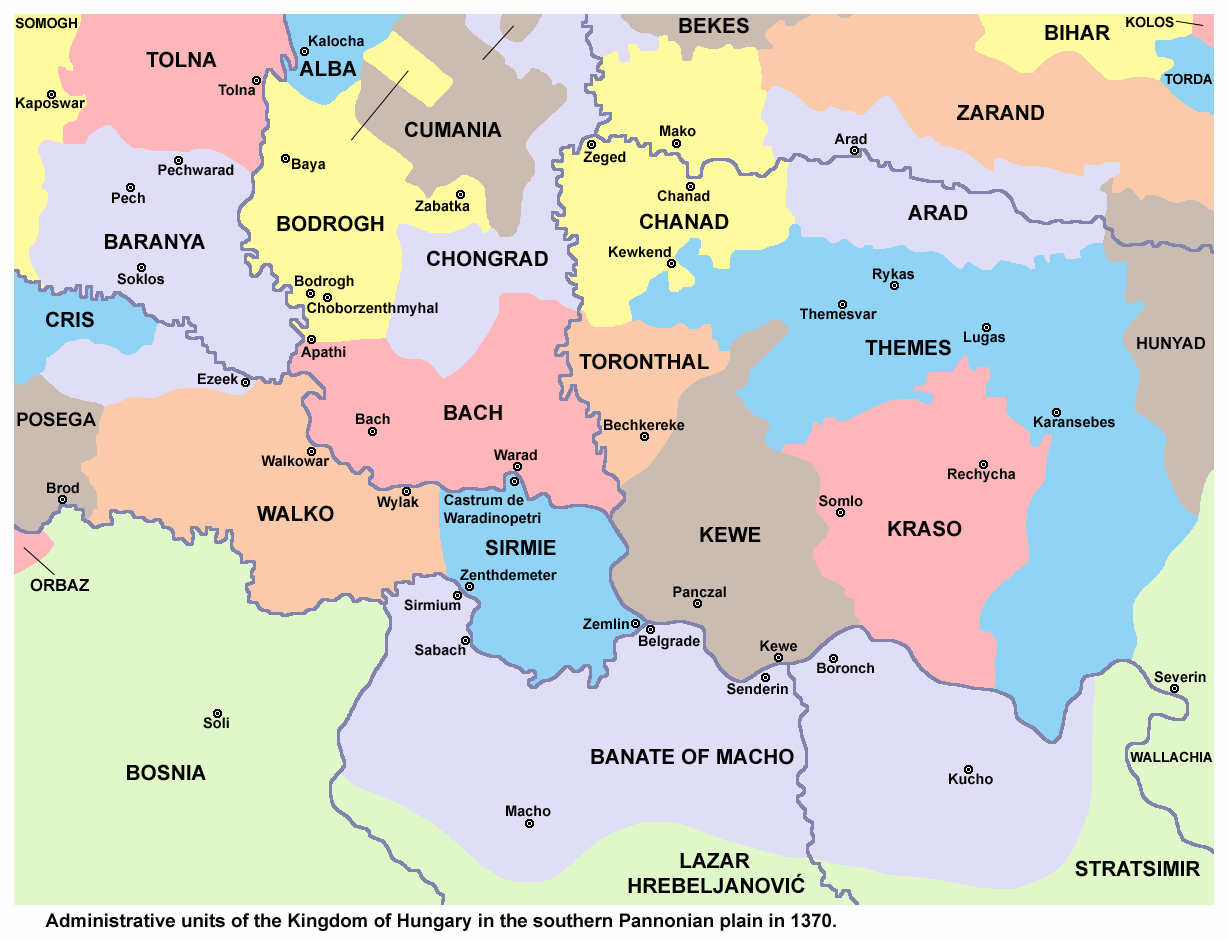
Banate of Macsó in 1370

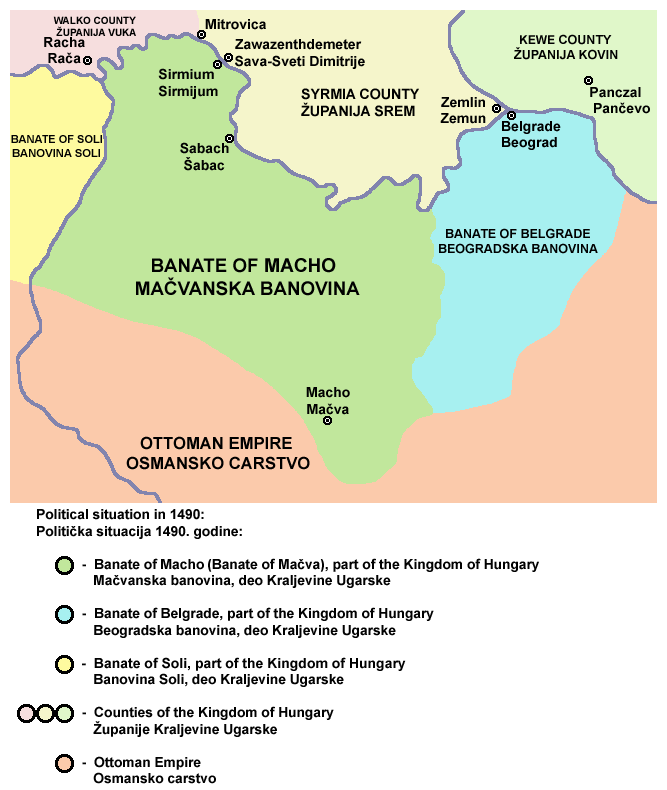
Banovina of Mačva in 1490

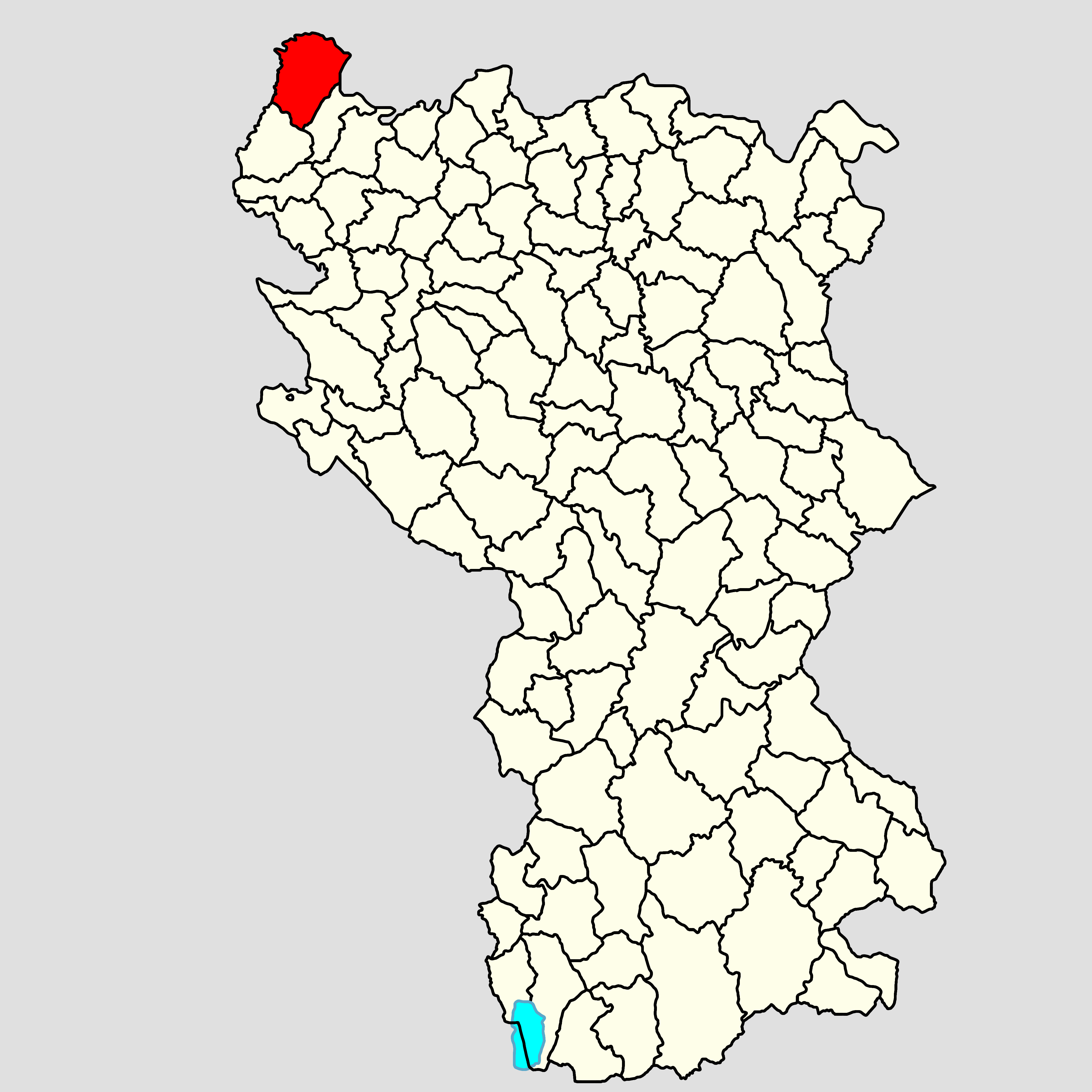
Srez of Mačva in the Kingdom of Serbia

The region was then included into Byzantine Empire, Frankish Kingdom, and Bulgarian Empire. In the 11th century, the Byzantine province known as the Theme of Sirmium included both, the present-day region of Syrmia and Mačva, thus Syrmia became the designation for both regions.

In the 13th century, the region was included into the Kingdom of Hungary and Banate of Macsó was formed in 1247. Banate was named after a town called Mačva, but the location of this settlement has not been clearly established in modern times. It is suspected that the town of Mačva existed a few kilometers down the river from modern-day Šabac.

During the Hungarian administration the region was ruled by several powerful bans. Hungarian king Béla IV granted authority over Mačva to Rostislav Mikhailovich, a refugee Russian prince. In the 13th century, Béla of Macsó (grandson of Béla IV) ruled Mačva as well as Usora and Soli (areas across Drina river in northeastern Bosnia and Herzegovina).

Between 1282 and 1316 the Serbian King Stefan Dragutin ruled the Kingdom of Syrmia, which consisted of Mačva, Usora, Soli and some adjacent territories. His capital cities were Debrc and Belgrade. In that time the name Syrmia was designation for two territories: Upper Syrmia (present-day Syrmia region) and Lower Syrmia (present day Mačva). Kingdom of Syrmia under the rule of Stefan Dragutin was located in Lower Syrmia. According to some sources, Stefan Dragutin also ruled over Upper Syrmia, but other sources are mentioning another local ruler, Ugrin Csák, who ruled over Upper Syrmia and Slavonija.

At first, Stefan Dragutin was a vassal of the Hungarian king, but since the central power in the Kingdom of Hungary collapsed, both, Stefan Dragutin and Ugrin Csák were de facto independent rulers. Stephen Dragutin died in 1316, and was succeeded by his son, King Vladislaus II (1316–1324). Vladislaus II was defeated by the king of Serbia, Stefan Dečanski, in 1324, and after this, Mačva became a subject of dispute between the Kingdom of Serbia and the Kingdom of Hungary.

In the 14th century, the bans of the Garay family (Paul Garay, Nicholas I Garay and his son Nicholas II Garay) which were under the Hungarian suzerainty expanded their rule not only to Bosnia but to Syrmia and the last one also became the ban of Slavonia and Croatia, which was also part of the Kingdom of Hungary at the time. Mačva was part of the Serbian Empire of Stefan Dušan and part of the state of the Serbian prince Lazar Hrebeljanović.

In the 15th century, Mačva was part of Serbian Despotate, and since 1459, it was part of the Ottoman Empire. In the 16th-17th century, Mačva was part of the Ottoman Sanjak of Zvornik, which was part of the Pashaluk of Bosnia. It was under Ottoman administration until 1718, when it was captured by the Habsburgs. Between 1718 and 1739, Mačva was part of the Habsburg-administered Kingdom of Serbia, and since 1739, it was again part of the Ottoman Empire. In this time, the region was part of the Ottoman Sanjak of Smederevo. In 1788, the "Mačvanska knežina" ("Princedom of Mačva" - a local administrative unit) had 25 villages with 845 houses. The name of the local administrator ("oberknez") was Uroš Drmanović. Between 1804 and 1815, Mačva was part of Serbia ruled by Karađorđe. Since 1817, it was part of the autonomous Principality of Serbia, and since 1882, part of the Kingdom of Serbia.

During World War I, the Austro-Hungarian army occupied the region and committed war crimes against innocent Serb civilians in Mačva and Podrinje. Beginning in 1918, the region was part of the Kingdom of Serbs, Croats and Slovenes (later renamed Yugoslavia). Between 1918 and 1922 the region was part of Podrinjski okrug, between 1922 and 1929 part of Podrinjska oblast, while between 1929 and 1941 it was part of Drina Banovina. Between 1941 and 1944, Mačva was part of the area governed by the Territory of the Military Commander in Serbia, and from 1945 to 1991, it has been part of the Socialist Republic of Serbia and new socialist Yugoslavia. After the breakup of Yugoslavia and Yugoslav Wars, Mačva became part of an independent Serbia.

== Geography ==
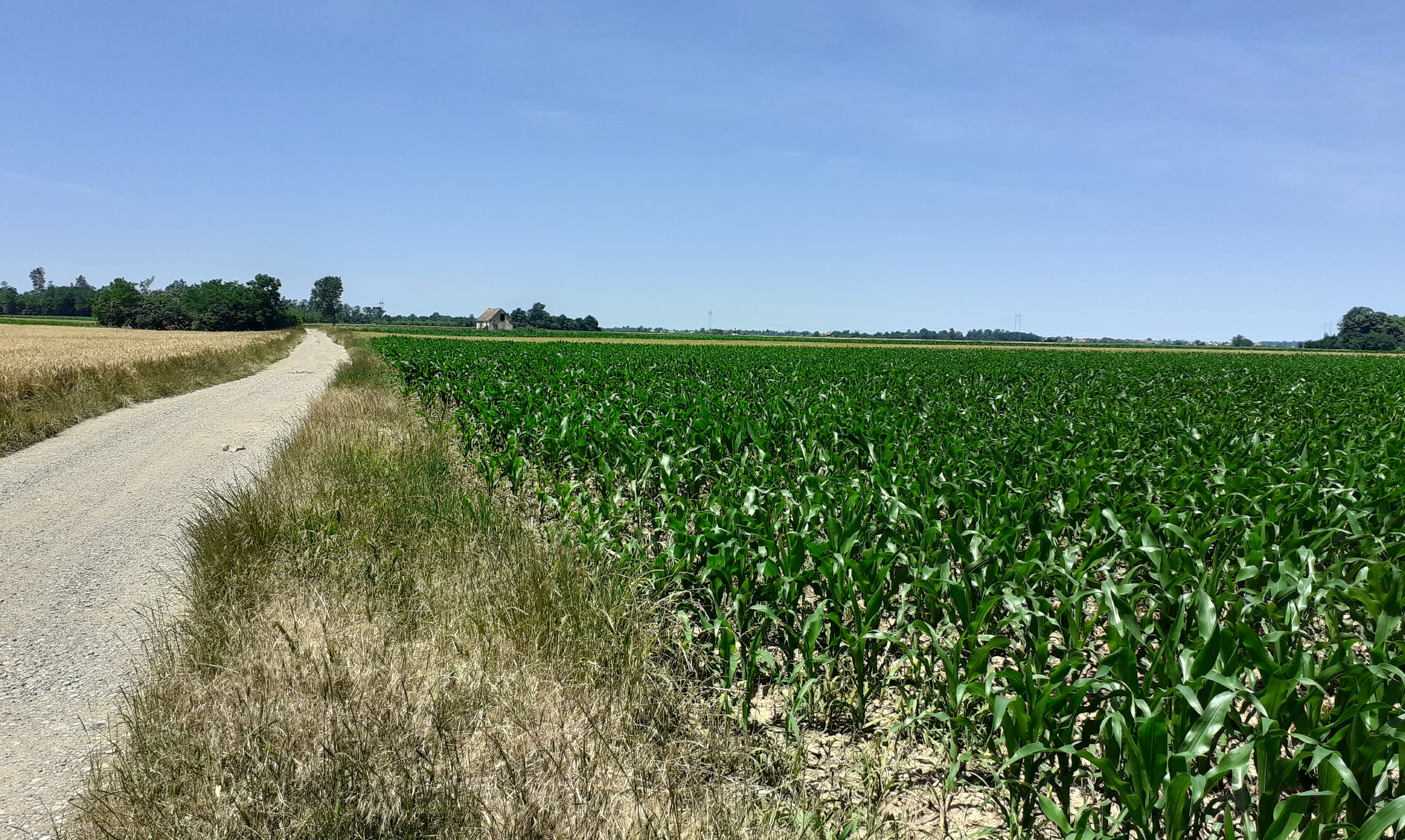
Rural landscape in Mačva

Mačva is located in the southern edge of Pannonian Plain, between the Cer mountain and Sava river. Territory of Mačva is divided among 3 municipalities: Šabac (including 18 settlements in Mačva), Bogatić (including 14 settlements in Mačva), and Sremska Mitrovica (including 7 settlements in Mačva). Total number of settlements in Mačva is 39, of which 37 are rural, and 2 (Šabac and Mačvanska Mitrovica) are urban.

The Kitog forest existed in the area until the mid-19th century.

== Demographics ==
List of largest settlements in Mačva:

- Šabac (51,163)
- Majur (6,664)
- Pocerski Pričinović (6,365)
- Bogatić (5,569)
- Badovinci (4,077)
- Mačvanska Mitrovica (3,380) (Note: Geographically located in Mačva, but it is part of Srem District in Vojvodina.)
- Mačvanski Prnjavor (3,324)

== See also ==
- Mačva District
- List of regions of Serbia

== Sources ==
- Bárány, Attila (2020). "The Relations of King Emeric and Andrew II of Hungary with the Balkan States". Stefan the First-Crowned and His Time. Belgrade: Institute of History. pp. 213–249. ISBN 9788677431396.
- Bataković, Dušan T., ed. (2005). Histoire du peuple serbe [History of the Serbian People] (in French). Lausanne: L’Age d’Homme. ISBN 9782825119587.
- Ćirković, Sima (2004). The Serbs. Malden: Blackwell Publishing. ISBN 9781405142915.
- Engel, Pál (2001). The Realm of St. Stephen: A History of Medieval Hungary, 895-1526. London & New York: I.B.Tauris. ISBN 9781850439776.
- Fine, John Van Antwerp Jr. (1991) [1983]. The Early Medieval Balkans: A Critical Survey from the Sixth to the Late Twelfth Century. Ann Arbor, Michigan: University of Michigan Press. ISBN 0472081497.
- Fine, John Van Antwerp Jr. (1994) [1987]. The Late Medieval Balkans: A Critical Survey from the Late Twelfth Century to the Ottoman Conquest. Ann Arbor, Michigan: University of Michigan Press. ISBN 0472082604.
- Fodor, Pál; Dávid, Géza, eds. (2000). Ottomans, Hungarians, and Habsburgs in Central Europe: The Military Confines in the Era of Ottoman Conquest. Leiden: BRILL. ISBN 9004119078.
- Font, Márta (2020). "Rostislav, Dominus de Macho". Stefan the First-Crowned and His Time. Belgrade: Institute of History. pp. 309–326. ISBN 9788677431396.
- Isailović, Neven (2016). "Living by the Border: South Slavic Marcher Lords in the Late Medieval Balkans (13th–15th Centuries)". Banatica. 26 (2): 105–117. Archived from the original on 2022-12-12.
- Ivanović, Miloš; Isailović, Neven (2015). "The Danube in Serbian-Hungarian Relations in the 14th and 15th Centuries". Tibiscvm: Istorie–Arheologie. 5: 377–393.
- Jireček, Constantin (1911). Geschichte der Serben. Vol. 1. Gotha: Perthes.
- Jireček, Constantin (1918). Geschichte der Serben. Vol. 2. Gotha: Perthes.
- Krstić, Aleksandar R. (2016). "The Rival and the Vassal of Charles Robert of Anjou: King Vladislav II Nemanjić". Banatica. 26 (2): 33–51.
- McDaniel, Gordon L. (1984). "On Hungarian-Serbian Relations in the Thirteenth Century: John Angelos and Queen Jelena" (PDF). Ungarn-Jahrbuch. 12 (1982-1983): München, 1984: 43–50.
- Pálosfalvi, Tamás (2018). From Nicopolis to Mohács: A History of Ottoman-Hungarian Warfare, 1389-1526. Leiden: BRILL. ISBN 9789004375659.
- Vasin, Dejana (2019). "Natural Conditions as a Factor of Urbanization of the Lower Posavina in the Middle Ages". Istraživanja: Journal of Historical Researches. 30 (30): 45–68. doi:10.19090/i.2019.30.45-68.
