= Petar Mišić (general) =

Serbian and Yugoslav general

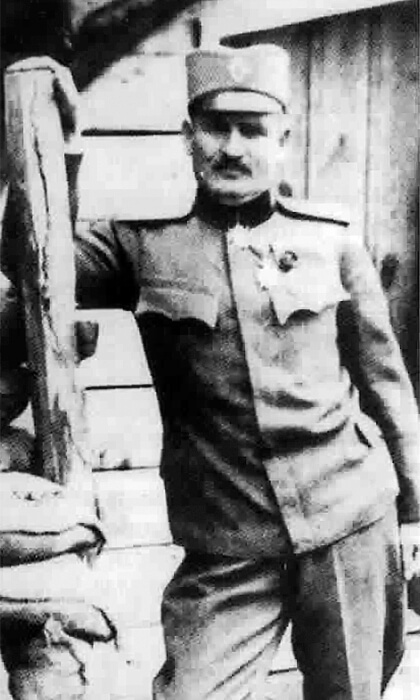
Petar Mišić

Petar Mišić (21 March 1863 – 29 May 1921) was a Serbian and Yugoslav general. He is one of the several main leaders of the May Coup, in which King Aleksandar Obrenović was killed in 1903. After he retired in 1906 at the request of the English, he entered politics. He was a prominent opponent of the Black Hand and the president of the court panel at the Salonica trial in 1917.

== Biography ==
Petar Mišić was born on 21 March (or 2 April according to the Gregorian calendar) in 1863 in Rajac, Serbia. He attended grammar school classes in Zaječar and Belgrade. After graduating from Gymnasium, he entered the Artillery School of the Military Academy in 1882. He graduated from the Higher Military Academy in 1885, when he was promoted to the rank of engineering lieutenant. He immediately took part in the Serbo-Bulgarian war in 1885 as a sergeant of the pioneer company of the Šumadija division. From 1885 to 1887 he was a sergeant in engineering. He was sent in 1887 as a state cadet for training in the engineering battalion in Russia. He was in the engineering battalion until 1888, and from 1888 to 1891 he attended the Nikolaev General Staff Academy in Imperial Russia. After returning from Russia, he was an infantry sergeant from 1891 to 1892, and in 1892 he became the commander of a student company. From 1892 to 1896 he was assistant and chief of the general staff of the Danube and then the Drina divisional area. He was promoted to the rank of general staff captain in 1895. From 1896 to 1899 he was the commander of the infantry battalion. He was Obrenović's favourite, and he enjoyed a great reputation among officers, with whom he was considered a great authority on many military issues. He knew tactics and strategy very well and was above average educated. He was considered brave, but also ruthless, not only towards the weaker but also towards the stronger comrades-in arms. As a professor at the Military Academy, he showed a propensity for revolution.

== May Coup ==
From 1899 to 1903, he was the commander of the 12th, then the 15th and finally the 6th Infantry Regiment. He was one of the main participants in the May Coup. He decided on the conspiracy because he believed that the dictatorship was the best for Serbia and that it should be achieved by revolution. At that time he was an infantry lieutenant colonel and commanded the 6th Infantry Regiment. Two days before the coup on 26 May 1903, a meeting of the main conspirators, commanded by Dragutin Dimitrijević (Apis) was held in the apartment of Lieutenant Colonel Mihailo Naumović, to which Mišić did not come under the pretext that he was not on good terms with Naumović. At that meeting, it was agreed that the coup would take place on 29 May (Old Style) or 11 June 1903 (New Style) at two o'clock after midnight. It was agreed that the main group of conspirator officers should join Mišić at 1:55 A.M., who at that time was supposed to pass by the Officers' Home with one battalion of the 6th Regiment. At the time retired lieutenant general Aleksandar Mašin (Queen Draga's brother) entered the barracks of the 12th Regiment to take command when Mišić's battalion arrived behind the scheduled time, so the other conspirators went into risky action without his immediate support. Although Mišić hesitated for a while at the time of departure, one of his subordinates led a company on his own, and then Mišić started, though with some delay. At 2:00 A.M. Commander of the Palace Guard Petar Živković opened the palace doors to the conspirators, now led by Mišić, who with his somewhat belated battalion stormed the palace and clashed with members of the Palace Guard, overcoming them. He took control of the yard and opened the gendarme gate of Petar Kosić's company. After capturing the Stari dvor, the conspirators were unable to find the king and queen at first. Because of that, Mišić announced prematurely that King Aleksandar Obrenović and Queen Draga had died and that Petar Karađorđević was the new king. In the meantime, the conspirators searched the palace and eventually found the royal couple in the early morning of 11 June 1903. King Alexander and Queen Draga were shot and their bodies mutilated and disembowelled and, according to eyewitness accounts, thrown from a second-floor window of the palace onto piles of garden manure. The King was only 26 years old and Draga was 37 at the time of their death. King Alexander and Queen Draga were buried in the crypt of St. Mark's Church, Belgrade. Also killed with the royal couple were: Prime Minister Dimitrije Cincar-Marković; Minister of the Army, Milovan S. Pavlović, and General-Adjutant Lazar Petrović.

== After the coup ==
After the coup, Mišić was able to choose which position he would take. In 1903, he was appointed head of the general military department of the Ministry of Defense. He proposed that a military government be formed after the coup. According to King Peter, he was so reckless that he treated him as an equal, so he told him that he should be content to get so much money for his civilian list. He became commander of the 7th Regiment again in 1905. The English government pressured the Serbian government for a long time and the king to retire the leading conspirators, including Mirko Milisavjević and others. In 1905, the conspirators were divided into two groups, the old conspirators and the young conspirators, who were in favour of the old conspirators withdrawing. In addition, Nikola Pašić won over Mišić and thus managed to break up a group of older conspirators. Due to various pressures on the leading older participants in the May coup, Mišić voluntarily retired in 1906.

== In politics ==
After retiring, he retired from politics. He became a member of the People's Radical Party and was elected a radical MP in the Negotin district. He attracted attention in the National Assembly with his interesting speeches, always advocating for military interests, primarily the military budget. In the Assembly, he sharply attacked the opponents of the May coup and proved that the coup was a revolution, so he did not represent a betrayal of the ruler. He stood out at the end of 1908 at a secret session of the Assembly, when he asked very awkward questions to Defense Minister Stepa Stepanović, who was then forced to resign. Mišić was dissatisfied with the new situation and King Peter Karađorđević, that in 1909 he declared his overthrow and bringing the English prince. He became an opponent of younger conspirators. He appeared in the assembly on 9 January 1912, with an interpellation and claims about the existence of the Black Hand, and asked for something to be done. Mišić's interpellation had a great public response.

== Judge in the Thessaloniki trial ==
Since he was retired, he did not take part in the Balkan wars. He was promoted at the beginning of the First World War as a colonel in the reserve. He participated in the First World War when he was reactivated. During the war, he was the commander of various joint detachments defending Belgrade in 1914. In 1916, he was the assistant commander of the Morava Division (Third Army). He belonged to the White Hand, a group of officers who were close to Alexander I Karađorđević and who opposed the Black Hand. In that group were Petar Živković, Josif Kostić, Pavle Jurišić Šturm, Miroslav Milisavljević and others. At the end of 1916 and during 1917 he was a judge in the Thessaloniki trial. Since he was known as an opponent of the members of the Black Hand, he was appointed president of the Trial Chamber in the Thessaloniki trial. As the president of the lower military court sentenced Dragutin Dimitrijević Apis and eight of his comrades to death. From 1917 to 1918 he was the commander of the Šumadija Division, which played a prominent role in the breakthrough of the Thessaloniki front. He was promoted to the rank of general on 21 October 1918. He was appointed commander of the Danube Divisional Area in December 1918 and remained there until his death. On several occasions (1892–1896, 1897-1900 and 1902–1906) was a part-time or full professor on the Staff of the Military Academy.

He died on 29 May 1921 in Vienna, Austria.

== Literature ==
- Narodna enciklopedija srpsko-hrvatsko-slovenačka, Belgrade, 1929, book 2, pages 991–992
- Vasa Kazimirović, Crna ruka, Prizma, Kragujevac, 1997.
- Dragiša Vasić, Nine Hundred and Third, Institute for Textbooks and Teaching Aids, Belgrade, 2003.
- David MacKenzie, Apis: "The congenial conspirator," East European Monographs, Boulder, Colorado, 1989.
- Slobodan Jovanović, Vlada Aleksandra Obrenovića, book 3, Belgrade, 1936.
- Živan Živanović, Politička istorija Srbije u drugoj polovini devetnaestog veka Knjiga četvrta 1897-1903, publisher: Izdavačka knjižarnica Gece Kona, Belgrade, 1925.

== See also ==
- Draga Mašin
- Alexander Obrenović
- Aleksandar Mašin
- Dragutin Dimitrijević "Apis"
- Petar Živković
