= The End of the Obrenović Dynasty =

- Created by: Milovan Vitezović
- Starring: Tihomir Stanić; Ljiljana Blagojević; Miodrag Krivokapić; Aleksandar Srećković; Nebojša Dugalić; Ivan Bekjarev
- Countries of origin: FR Yugoslavia; (Serbia)
- No. of episodes: 11

Production
- Running time: approx. 61 minutes

Original release
- Network: TV Belgrade
- Release: 22 January – 2 April 1995

The End of the Obrenović Dynasty (Serbian: Крај династије Обреновић) is а Serbian historical drama television miniseries which depicts events that led to the May Overthrow and assassination of the last Serbian king from the Obrenović dynasty, Alexander, and his close family.

== Plot ==
Captain Dragutin Dimitrijević and his army man conspire to overthrow King Alexander I of Serbia to put an end to his autocratic rule.

== Cast ==
- Tihomir Stanić as King Alexander Obrenović
- Ljiljana Blagojević as Queen Draga Obrenović
- Miodrag Krivokapić as Đorđe Genčić
- Aleksandar Srećković as Nikodije Lunjevica
- Jelica Sretenović as Hristina Lunjevica
- Vladan Gajović as Nikola Lunjevica
- Bojana Maljević as Vojka Lunjevica
- Marko Nikolić as general Dimitrije Cincar-Marković
- Branko Jerinić as general Milovan Pavlović
- Aljoša Vučković as general Laza Petrović
- Nebojša Dugalić as lieutenant Antonije Antić
- Siniša Ćopić as captain Dragutin Dimitrijević Apis
- Andrija Maričić as captain Radomir Aranđelović
- Lepomir Ivković as captain Mihajlo Ristić
- Igor Pervić as captain Velimir Vemić
- Petar Kralj as Nikola Pašić
- Ivan Bekjarev as Boža Maršićanin
- Branislav Jerinić as general Jovan Atanacković
- Dušan Janjićijević as Jovan Avakumović
- Boško Puletić as Živan Živanović
- Ljiljana Dragutinović as Mrs Živanović
- Miodrag Krstović as colonel Aleksandar Mašin
- Miodrag Radovanović as Austrian ambassador Konstantin Dumba
- Stevo Žigon as Russian ambassador Charikov
- Dušan Bulajić as general Leonid Solarević
- Danilo Lazović as colonel Dimitrije Nikolić
- Dušan Tadić as colonel Petar Mišić
- Mirko Babić as major Milisav Živanović
- Aleksandar Berček as King Milan Obrenović
- Bata Živojinović as Aleksa Novaković
- Jelena Žigon as Mrs Novaković
- Mirko Bulović as Nikola Hadži-Toma
- Borivoje Stojanović as Vladan Đorđević
- Vasa Pantelić as Emperor Franz Joseph
