= Mihailo Ristić-Džervinac =

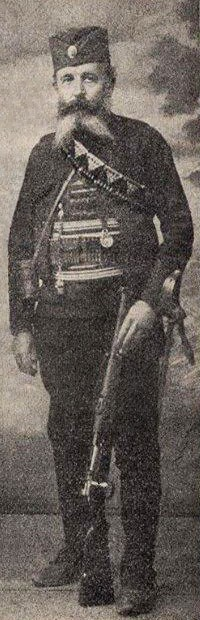
- Born: October 1854; Svrljig, Sanjak of Niš (modern Serbia)
- Died: 31 January 1916 (aged 61)
- Military career
- Allegiance: Serbian Chetnik Organization (1903–08); (Kingdom of Serbia) Serbian Army (1912)
- Service years: 1904–12
- Nicknames: Uča (slang for "teacher"); Džervinac
- Conflicts: Macedonian Struggle, Balkan Wars

Mihailo Ristić-Džervinac (Serbian Cyrillic: Михаило Ристић-Џервинац; c. 1854–1916) was a senior Serbian officer, co-conspirator of the May Coup, and chief of the Upper Staff of East Povardarie during the Serbian Chetnik operations in Old Serbia and Macedonia in the beginning of the 20th century.

== Early life ==
Ristić-Džervinac was born in October 1954, in a village near Svrljig, in the Sanjak of Niš. In 1880, after attending school in Belgrade, he became a teacher. He also enlisted as a reserve officer and participated in the Serbo-Bulgarian War, where he reserve artillery second lieutenant in 1888. In 1892, he entered active military service in Knjaževac as a lieutenant

== May Coup ==
While serving as an artillery lieutenant, Ristić-Džervinac joined the forces who would go on to perform the May Coup. Ristić-Džervinac and Milutin Lazarevic procured dynamite to blast down walls and doors to enter the palace. Prior to the coup, Ristić-Džervinac met with Dragutin Dimitrijević.

When the conspirators stormed the palace, the royal family attempted to hide. It was Ristić-Džervinac, along with Ilija Radivojevic-Cicha and Velimir Vemić, who found them. Ristić-Džervinac shot first, killing both King Alexander and Queen Draga. Radivojevic and Vemic also shot at the king and queen. Lazar Petrović attempted to defend the king, but was also killed by the conspirators.

Following the king's execution, Ristić-Džervinac addressed soldiers outside from a window. He then ordered that the king's body be thrown from the window into the garden, followed by the queen.

When later asked why he ordered it, he said,

"If you are going to be right, I did not know exactly at that moment. But I had one thing, even before that, in mind: that so many soldiers stood there, who were brought and came at the command of their elders, and not knowing why. And in the course of the shooting and all that the Russian army, which from 2 o’clock began and lasted until 4 o’clock in the morning and the soldiers could already see what was being done. Those who until this morning knew only their allegiance to the king, who knows what thoughts they have now in their heads rumored, looking at it all. In addition, our constant supposition hovered, that from which any side a counterattack might have come, and even that which they swayed there. And in order for everything to be a clear certainty, that the king, together with the queen, was no more, from somewhere a thought was imposed on me, which, in the one until the peak of the excitement in question, and I carried out: I ordered both to be thrown out the window.”

== Chetnik Organization ==
From 1903 to 1908, Ristić-Džervinac was a member of the Serbian Chetnik Organization. Despite being an officer within the organization from 1906 to 1907, Ristić-Džervinac became dissatisfied with it and wished for reform. Eventually, Ristić-Džervinac left the organization. He was replaced in the command structure by Vojin Popović.

== Military service ==
Ristić-Džervinac participated in the Balkan Wars as part of the Serbian military. He later fought World War I in Albania. While participating in road construction in late 1915, he fell and was injured, which led to him being removed from combat.

== Death ==
After his fall in late 1915, Ristić-Džervinac was taken to a military hospital in Ferryville near Bizerte, in Tunisia. On January 31, 1916, he died and was buried in a communal grave.
