= Mihailo Naumović =

Serbian army officer and conspirator

- Born: Principality of Serbia
- Died: May 29, 1903; Belgrade, Kingdom of Serbia
- Spouse: Ljubica Đurić
- Children: 3
- Relatives: Naum Krnar (grandfather); Duke Čolak Anta Simeonović (grandfather)
- Military career
- Allegiance: Kingdom of Serbia
- Branch: Royal Serbian Army
- Rank: Lieutenant colonel

Mihailo Naumović (? − Belgrade, May 29, 1903) was a Serbian army officer. A lieutenant colonel in the General Staff and an adjutant of King Aleksandar Obrenović, he was killed while defending the king in the 1903 May Coup.

== Biography ==
Naumović was the son of cavalry colonel Jovan Naumović cavalry colonel, first adjutant of Prince Aleksandar Karađorđević, and the grandson of Naum Krnar, who was killed together with Karađorđe in 1817 at Radovanjski lug. Through his mother Mileva Trpezić, Naumović was also the grandson of Duke Čolak Anta Simeonović of Kruševac.

Although Naumović enjoyed King Aleksandar Obrenović's sympathy and trust, the conspirators approached him seeking help in the realisation of their conspiracy, reminding Naumović that his grandfather, Naum Krnar, had been killed by order of the king's grandfather Miloš Obrenović. From the beginning, Naumović expressed sympathy for the conspiracy but wanted to know who was involved. He was informed that Đorđe Genčić and General Jovan Atanacković were part of the conspiracy, and he was particularly motivated upon learning of the general's involvement. He was asked to discuss everything with Genčić, and a night meeting was organised in his vineyard near Topovski Šupa, which was also attended by Dragutin Dimitrijević (known as Apis) and Antonije Antić. After this meeting, Naumović officially joined the conspiracy. The king was informed by Božidar Maršićanin, manager of the city of Belgrade, that Naumović was part of a conspiracy, but the king dismissed the rumours.

The last meeting before the coup was held on May 26 in Naumović's vineyard on Topčider and was attended by Genčić, retired colonel Aleksandar Mašin, lieutenant colonel Naumović, major Milivoje Anđelković, captain Dimitrijević, captain Đorđe Ristić and lieutenant Antić. Colonel Petar Mišić was also supposed to attend the meeting but he did not come under the pretext that he was not on good terms with Naumović. During the royal murder Naumović was killed by a fellow conspirator who was not aware of his participation.

== Personal life ==
Naumović married Ljubica Đurić, daughter of General Dimitrije Đurić and granddaughter of Dimitrije Matić. All three of their sons were officers in the Royal Serbian Army. Captain Aleksandar died near Vranje in 1915, and second lieutenant Borivoje died in 1916. Their eldest son Milivoje fought as a Chetnik under Vojin Popović and was wounded 17 times, after the First World War, he completed his law studies in Paris then married Milena Milojević, granddaughter of minister Jevrem Grujić.
