= Naum Krnar =

Greek soldier (died 1817)

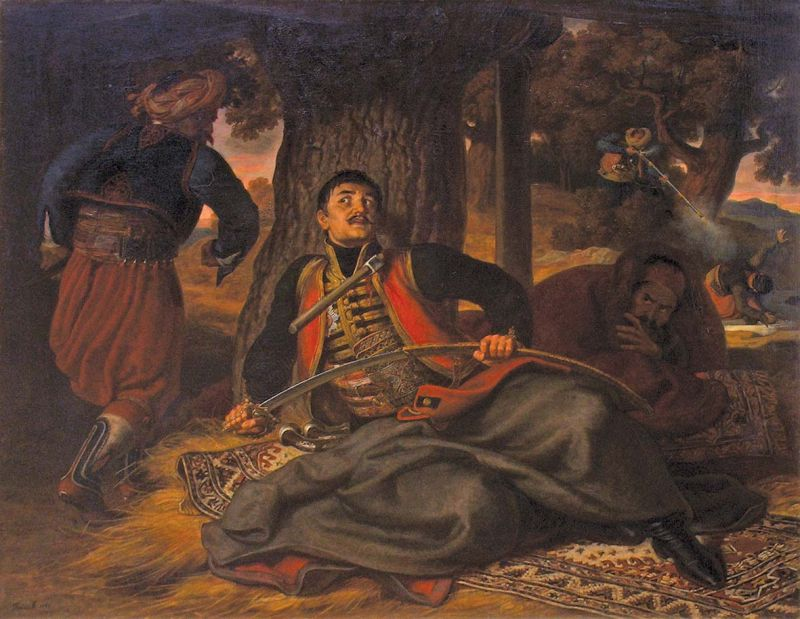
The assassination of Karađorđe and Naum Krnar is depicted in this 1863 painting by Mór Than. Krnar is depicted being shot in the background.

Naum Krnar (Serbian Cyrillic: Наум Крнар; d. 13 July 1817) was the secretary of Karađorđe, the leader of the First Serbian Uprising.

== Biography ==
Krnar was an ethnic Greek, hailing from Thessaly. He spoke several languages and worked as a merchant in Belgrade. With the outbreak of the uprising, Krnar, who had enriched himself through the trade of leather and fur, immediately joined Karađorđe in the organization, and became his personal diplomatic advisor, secretary and chairman in the Serbian Ruling Council (Praviteljstvujušči sovjet serbski). It is unknown whether he fled Serbia with Karađorđe after the suppression by the Ottomans in 1813. As many of the Serbian commanders, he found refuge in the Russian Empire. He was a founding member of the Filiki Eteria (1814).

=== Murder ===
On 12 July 1817, on the Feast of Saints Peter and Paul, he and Karađorđe secretly crossed the Danube into Serbia, in order to continue the Serbian Revolution, however, the leader of the Second Serbian Uprising, Miloš Obrenović (who had stopped the rebellion in exchange for Ottoman autonomy), learnt of this and had them both beheaded, their heads sent to the Sultan in Constantinople. Karađorđe and Krnar stayed in a cottage in the village of Radovanje in the Smederevo nahija. Nikola Novaković, a henchman of Vujica Vulićević, first killed the sleeping Karađorđe with an axe blow to the head, then shot Krnar, who was washing himself and getting water for Karađorđe in the river downwards from the cottage, with a rifle, on 13 July. Novaković beheaded both with his yatagan, and took them with him on horse to Kolare, and then to Belgrade, where he gave them to Miloš Obrenović. Obrenović in turn gave them to Marashli Ali Pasha who took them to Constantinople. The heads were on public display for seven days. They were then held at the Museum of Sciences in Istanbul. They say that Greeks later stole the heads, and took them to Athens to be held in a museum. The bodies of Karađorđe and Krnar were buried in a tomb in Radovanje Grove by priest Jovan and Dragić Vojkić. The body of Karađorđe was transferred to Oplenac in 1919, while Krnar's body is still buried in the tomb.

== Descendants ==
Krnar left a young son, Joca, after him. Joca took the surname Naumović. Joca was handsome, tall, had black hair and moustache. He was serious, agreeable, a capable and correct officer. Joca was a cavalry officer, and later served as first adjutant of Aleksandar Karađorđević (r. 1842–1858), with the rank of colonel, then served as a chief of an okrug. Pensioned, he died at 64 years of age on 28 December 1878 in Belgrade and was buried in the Church of St. Mark in Palilula. He had three sons (Mihailo, Mirko, Boja) and a daughter (Maca).

The rule of Alexander Obrenović (r. 1889–1903) was largely criticized, with dissatisfaction throughout the country. After a failed attempt to kill Obrenović, a military conspiracy group decided to stage the assassination at the royal palace. They recruited officers of the Royal Guard, including lieutenant colonel Mihailo Naumović, a grandson of Naum, who had sympathy toward the Karađorđević dynasty due to the murder of his grandfather ordered by Miloš Obrenović. The royal couple were assassinated in the May Coup (1903), which led to the reinstatement of the Karađorđević dynasty.

== See also ==
- List of Serbian Revolutionaries

== Sources ==
- Сима Милутиновић Сарајлија (1990). Трагедиjа српскога господара и вожда Карађорђа. БИГЗ. ISBN 9788613004905.
- Nenadović, Konstantin N. (1903). Život i dela velikog Đorđa Petrovića Kara-Đorđa Vrhovnog Vožda, oslobodioca i Vladara Srbije i život njegovi Vojvoda i junaka: Kao gradivo za Srbsku Istoriju od godine 1804 do 1813 i na dalje. Belgrade.
