= Aleksandar Mašin =

Serbian military officer (1857–1910)

Colonel Aleksandar Mašin
- Serbian Cyrillic: Александар Машин; Czech: Aleksandár Mašín
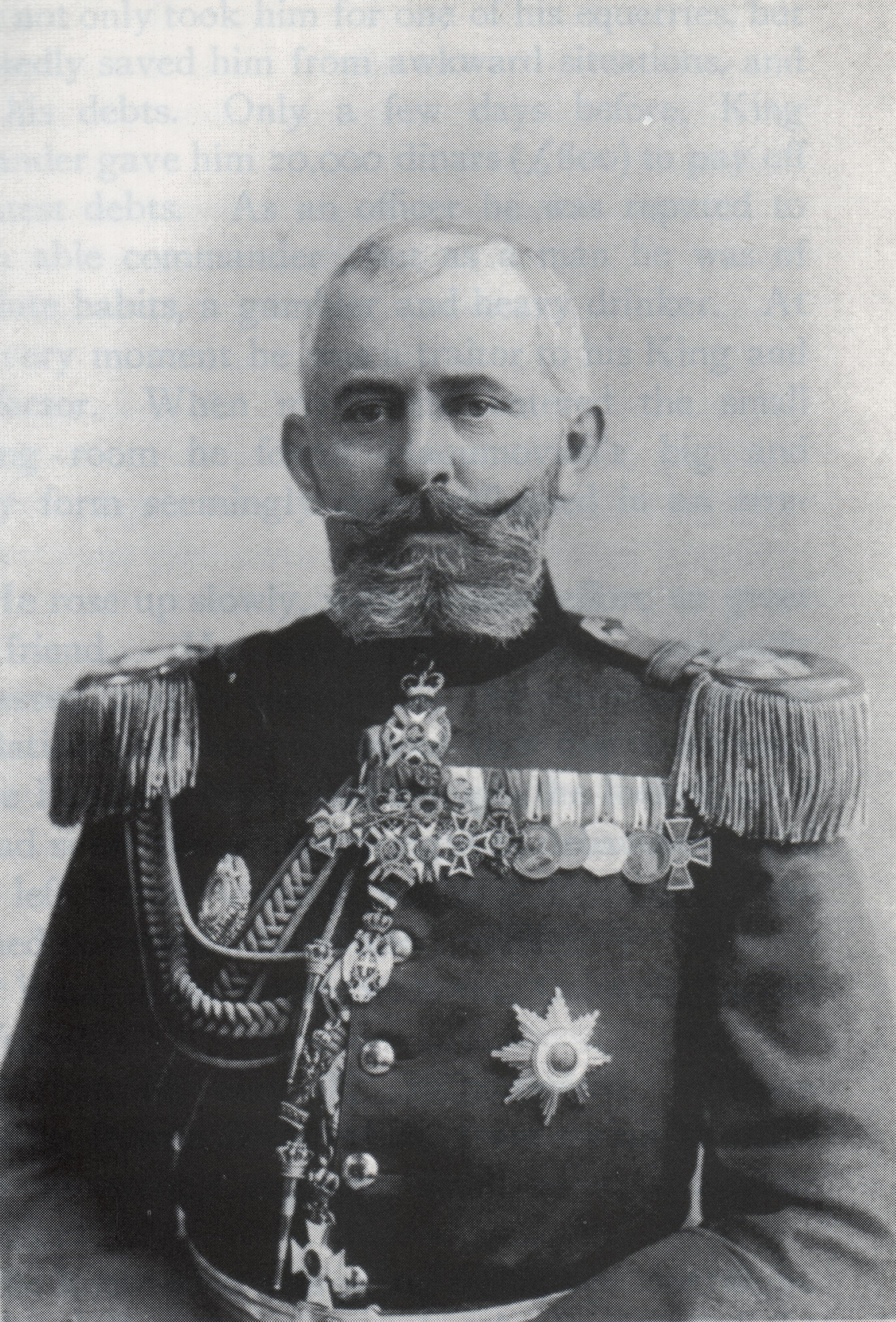
- Mašin pictured before 1907.
- Born: May 24, 1857; Belgrade, Principality of Serbia
- Died: April 18, 1910 (aged 52); Belgrade, Kingdom of Serbia
- Burial place: Belgrade New Cemetery; 44°48′34″N 20°29′14″E
- Relatives: Draga Mašin (sister-in-law)
- Military career
- Allegiance: Principality of Serbia; Kingdom of Serbia
- Branch: Armed Forces of the Principality of Serbia; Royal Serbian Army
- Service years: 1871–1900; 1903–1906
- Rank: General Staff Colonel
- Commands: General Staff (Acting Chief)
- Conflicts: Serbian–Ottoman Wars (1876–1878); Serbo-Bulgarian War
- Awards: Order of Karađorđe's Star with Swords; Order of the White Eagle; Order of the Cross of Takovo; Order of Miloš the Great
- Other work: One of leaders of the May Coup; Minister of Construction

Aleksandar Mašin (Serbian Cyrillic: Александар Машин, Czech: Aleksandár Mašín; 24 May 1857 – 18 April 1910) was a Serbian military officer of Czech descent. As a colonel of the Royal Serbian Army, he was one of officers that staged the May Coup of 1903 against King Alexander I of Serbia.

== Early life and career ==
Mašin was the son of immigrants originally from Cerhenice in the Kingdom of Bohemia, who had settled in the Principality of Serbia in 1846, during the reign of Prince Alexander Karađorđević. His father, Jovan Mašin, was a skilled physician who worked at the Prince's court and always kept loyalty to the Karađorđević dynasty. Despite this and thanks to his intelligence, Mašin received protection, as a young officer, from King Milan I, from the rival Obrenović dynasty. He became aide-de-camp to the monarch.

Thanks to the favor of Milan, his son King Alexander I sent him as plenipotentiary representative to the Principality of Montenegro in 1897. He participated as a military expert in the Serbian delegation sent to the Hague Convention of 1899.

Mašin was the brother of Svetozar Mašin, first husband of Draga Mašin, later Queen of Serbia by her marriage to King Alexander. Mašin's relations with his sister-in-law, always bad, further deteriorated after her marriage to the sovereign in 1900, with Mašin, then General Staff Colonel, passing into the reserve.

The conspirators against the royal couple, led by Captain Dragutin Dimitrijević Apis, chose him as leader of the assault against the Royal Palace. He chaired the meeting that decided the assault on the palace on 7 June [O.S. 25 May] 1903.

== Participation in the May Coup ==
On 10–11 June [O.S. 28–29 May] 1903, according to plans finalized two days earlier by the conspirators, Mašin spent the afternoon at the Officers Club in Belgrade. Around midnight, after putting on his military uniform, he went to the headquarters of the 7th Regiment where he took command and led them to the Royal Palace. The regiment surrounded the palace and waited for the arrival of a regiment led by another conspiracy officer.

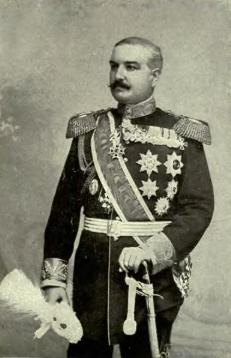
General Lazar Petrović, aide-de-camp to Alexander I, who tried to defend the royal couple and died in the attack on the palace.

Mašin waited outside the palace for the unsuccessful search for the royal couple in the old palace, and prevented the ploy of General Lazar Petrović, aide-de-camp to the King, attempting to divert the attackers' attention to the new palace once they had not found the couple in the old palace. He participated in the second search of the palace that led to the discovery of the couple hidden in a secret chamber attached to the bedroom.

At four in the morning he led the group of officers who received the Russian representative, who requested the removal of the bodies of the couple from the palace garden (present-day Pioneers Park).

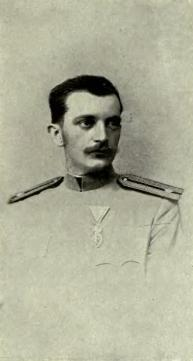
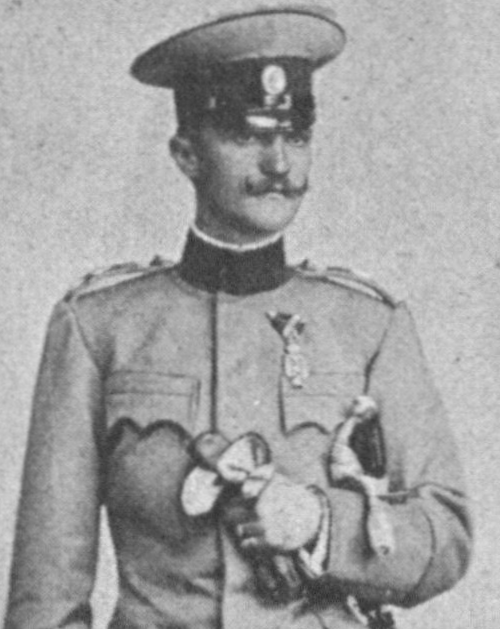
Nikola (left) and Nikodije (right) Lunjevica, younger brothers of Queen Draga and captains of the army, killed by order of Mašin.

He ordered Lieutenant Vojislav Tankosić to assassinate Queen Draga's two younger brothers. Both were executed by firing squad at their division headquarters. He also ordered the murder of Interior Minister Velja Todorović, who managed to survive, presumed dead. During the interval between the first and the second search for the royal couple, he ordered the capture of members of the government, to prevent the aid to the couple and ensure the success of the coup.

== Later career ==
Immediately after the coup, Mašin was one of the conspirators who became part of the new provisional government, as Minister of Construction. He opposed the proclamation of a republic, which some conspirators argued for.

Between 1905 and 1906, he was acting Chief of the Serbian General Staff. He was one of the top 6 conspirators that the British demanded that they lose their public jobs to re-establish diplomatic relations. In May 1906 the Serbian government was willing to comply with British demands and Mašin, among other military personnel, retired, which allowed the resumption of diplomatic relations between Serbia and the United Kingdom on the third anniversary of the May Coup 11 June [O.S. 29 May] 1906.

== Bibliography ==
- Mijatović, Čedomilj (1907). A royal tragedy; being the story of the assassination of King Alexander and Queen Draga of Servia. Eveleigh Nash. p. 230. OCLC 12538407.
- Vucinich, Wayne S. (2006). Serbia Between East and West. The Events of 1903–1908. ACLS History E-Book Project. p. 324. ISBN 9781597402422.

Political offices
Preceded by Pavle Denić	Minister of Construction; 1903	Succeeded by Vladimir Todorović
Military offices
Preceded by Radomir Putnik	Chief of the Serbian General Staff; Acting; 1905–1906	Succeeded by Petar Bojović; Acting
