= 1901 Serbian Senate election =

Senate elections were held in Serbia on 5 August 1901. They followed the promulgation of a new, liberal constitution in May, which created a bicameral People's Representative Body consisting of an elected National Assembly and a largely appointed Senate. The National Assembly had been elected in May 1901.

== Electoral system ==
The Senate consisted of 30 members appointed for life membership by the King and 18 members elected for six year terms. Membership was limited to people aged 40 or over and who had paid at least 200 dinars in annual taxation, although the taxation requirement was waived for a range of former public officials, including ex-ministers and diplomats. Voting rights were granted to men over the age of 21 who paid at least 45 dinars a year in direct taxation.

== Results ==
The elections were marred by demonstrations in Belgrade, during which the police arrested and killed several demonstrators. Although the People's Radical Party won a majority of seats, they were only offered three ministerial positions by King Alexander, with independent Aleksa Jovanović becoming Prime Minister.

== Aftermath ==
The combined People's Representative Body met for the first time on 1 October. Rista Popović was elected as Speaker of the National Assembly and Dimitrije Marinković as Speaker of the Senate.
