= White Hand (Serbia) =

Serbian secret military society based on Black Hand (Serbia)

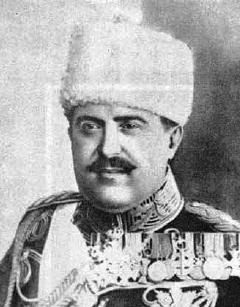
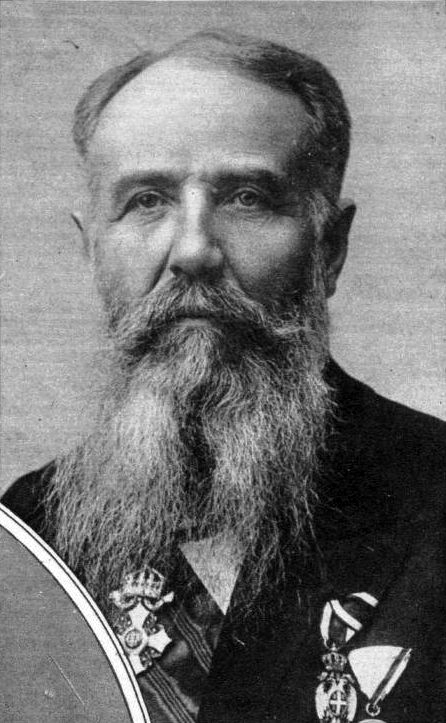
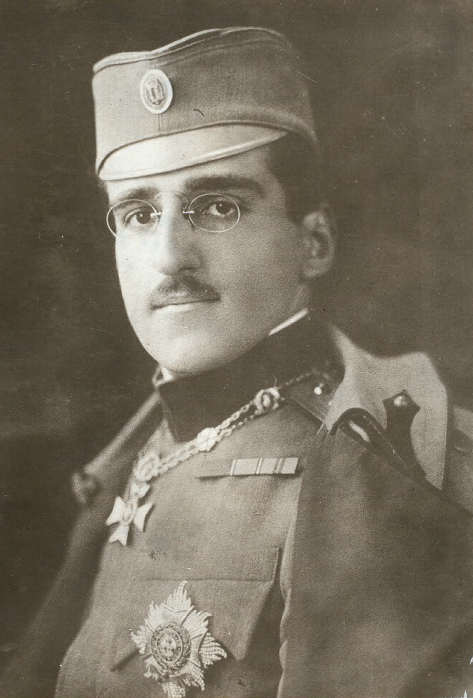
Petar Živković, Nikola Pašić and Prince Aleksandar

The White Hand (Serbian: Бела Рука / Bela Ruka) was a secret military organization in the Kingdom of Serbs, Croats, and Slovenes (later the Kingdom of Yugoslavia). It was established in order to counter the influence of the Black Hand, and relied on the People's Radical Party.

== Background ==
The May Coup (1903) which overthrew Aleksandar Obrenović was orchestrated by Dragutin Dimitrijević (called "Apis") and his group of lower officers, among whom were Petar Živković. Petar Karađorđević was crowned King of Serbia, and in contrast to the Austrophile Obrenović dynasty, Karađorđević relied on Russia and France, which provoked rising hostility from Austria-Hungary. The conspiracy group had toppled Obrenović on the pretext of pursuing the liberation and unification of Serb lands (Pan-Serbism).

The retirement of some of the conspirators involved in the May Coup eventually led to the division of the conspiratory group into two quarrelling sides: the conspirators that stayed behind the dynasty and those who stood against it; the first was close to the court and government, the second dissatisfied. The split began in 1906, and subsequently spilled over into the Army. Serbian crown prince Aleksandar and Apis had disagreements, and Živković and Apis had a falling-out. Živković accused Apis and other members of libel. The division brought about the establishment of the Black Hand and White Hand. The dissatisfied group established Unification or Death (the Black Hand) in 1911.

== History ==
Military officers led by Colonel Petar Živković established the White Hand organization in the Belgrade hotel "Paris", in 1912. The organization held itself as the defender of the dynasty and state from anarchy and pressures. The organization managed to attract many of Apis' opponents and indecisives. Some time prior to the abdication of Petar I, crown prince Aleksandar joined up with the White Hand and Nikola Pašić's People's Radical Party as well as high-ranking officers Josif Kostić, Pavle Jurišić Šturm, Petar Mišić, Milan Dunjić, Mirko Milisavljević and Miloje Zečević. Pašić was unsatisfied with the politics during the Balkan Wars.

With the demise of the Black Hand in the Salonika Trial (1917), the White Hand steadily gained control of the young and ambitious Prince Alexander. Živković was made the head of the Palace Guard in 1921 and started amassing power. In 1929, King Alexander I, along with officers of the White Hand orchestrated a coup in an attempt to control the growing nationalist tensions in the country (especially in Croatia) and the instability of the Parliament. Živković, now a general, was appointed prime minister. The autocracy was eased in 1931 when the King re-instated some constitutional rights after his reforms completely failed in their purpose, and Živković lost his position in 1932 after organizing numerous show trials against minority leaders, ultra-nationalist groups, and communists.

The members of White Hand are also suspected of being involved in the abdication of heir-apparent Prince George in favour of Alexander (1909), the installment of Alexander as a regent during the reign of Peter I, as well as the coup of 27 March 1941, which placed the underage King Peter II Karađorđević in power, effectively putting Yugoslavia in a state of war with Germany.

With the victory of the communist forces of Josip Broz Tito during Second World War, members of the White Hand were either executed by the new regime or fled abroad.

== See also ==
- Secret society

== Sources ==
- Živojinović, Dragoljub R. (1988). Petar I Karađorđević: U otadžbini, 1903-1914. godine. Beogradskĭ izdavačko-grafički zavod.
- Krestić, Petar (2007). Нововековне српске династије у мемоаристици [New Age Serbian Dynasties in Memoir Writing] (in Serbian). Istorijski institut. ISBN 978-86-7743-066-5.
- Историјски часопис 29-30 (1982-1983). Istorijski institut. 1 August 1983. pp. 488–. GGKEY:BC9T8KY39QK.
- Srejović, Dragoslav; Gavrilović, Slavko; Ćirković, Sima M. (1983). Istorija srpskog naroda: knj. Od Berlinskog kongresa do Ujedinjenja 1878-1918 (2 v.). Srpska književna zadruga.
