= May 1903 Serbian parliamentary election =

Parliamentary elections were held in Serbia on 1 June [O.S. 19 May] 1903. However, the elected members never convened due to the May Coup that occurred on 10–11 June [O.S. 28–29 May] 1903.

== Background ==
The elections were called after a self-coup by King Alexander I on 25 March. Alexander first issued a royal proclamation suspending the 1901 constitution and disbanding the parliament elected in 1901. He then appointed new members to the Senate. Through a second proclamation 45 minutes later, he reinstated the constitution and called for fresh elections in May.

The government prepared an agreed list of candidates, which included members of all existing parties, although only who were considered "moderate". The Radical Party boycotted the elections amidst a police crackdown on the opposition, though some independent Liberals, Radicals and Progressives presented their own lists in some constituencies.

== Results ==
Party	Votes	%
Government lists	182,538	57.35
Radical and Progressive lists	134,400	42.23
Liberal lists	1,322	0.42
Total	318,260	100.00
Source: Mitrinović & Brasić

== Aftermath ==
Due to the May Coup, during which both King Alexander I and Prime Minister Dimitrije Cincar-Marković were assassinated, a government was formed under Jovan Avakumović. The government reconvened the previous parliament with the intention of amending the constitution and to elect a new king. Fresh elections were held in September 1903 under a new constitution.
