= Petar Mišić =

Petar Mišić may refer to:

- Petar Mišić (footballer)
- Petar Mišić (general)
