= Konspiracija (secret society) =

- Конспирација
- Formation: 1938
- Dissolved: 1941
- Region served: Kingdom of Yugoslavia

Konspiracija (Serbian Cyrillic: Конспирација, "conspiracy") was a secret society that sought to overthrow the Yugoslav regency.

== History ==
The board, according to a document, included Dragiša Vasić, Mladen Žujović and Momir Nikolić, and contributors on military questions, Antonije Antić, Velimir Vemić and Staniša Kostić. According to lieutenant Staniša Kostić, several members of the Serbian Cultural Club (SKK) were founders of the conspiracy group. The organization was modeled after the Black Hand, including the recruitment process. Antonije Antić and Velimir Vemić, two former Black Hand members, gave instructions on how to establish secret 5-men groups within the Yugoslav Army (VJ). It would have easy approach to higher military leaders via already existing channels between leaders of opposition and friendly military personnel.

The organization opposed the Yugoslav accession to the Tripartite Pact on 25 March 1941. Two days later, the Yugoslav coup d'état was successful.

== Members ==
- Dragiša Vasić, lawyer and World War I veteran, member of SKK
- Mladen Žujović, lawyer and World War I veteran, member of SKK
- Momir Nikolić
- Antonije Antić, member of Black Hand
- Velimir Vemić, member of Black Hand
- Staniša Kostić, lieutenant
- Srba Popov, major

== See also ==
- Conspiracy groups against the Yugoslav regency
  - Vladislav Ribnikar's group
  - Mustafa Golubić's communist group

== Sources ==
- Kazimirović, Vasa (1995). Srbija i Jugoslavija, 1914-1945: Srbija i Jugoslavija između dva svetska rata. Prizma. ISBN 9788670840010.
- Zečević, Momčilo (2003). Prošlost i vreme: iz istorije Jugoslavije. Prosveta. ISBN 9788607013937.
