= 1901 Serbian National Assembly election =

Parliamentary elections were held in Serbia on 22 May 1901 to elect the members of the National Assembly. They were the first elections held under the 1901 constitution, which provided for a bicameral parliament consisting of a National Assembly and a Senate.

== Background ==
In the summer of 1900 King Alexander I suddenly announced his engagement to Draga Mašin. Disapproving of this, the government of Vladan Đorđević resigned. A government led by Aleksa Jovanović was appointed in its place, but resigned in March 1901 and was replaced by a coalition government led by Mihailo Vujić. The Vujić government prepared a new liberal constitution, which was promulgated by the king on 6 April.

The new "octroyed" constitution provided for a bicameral parliament with a fully-elected 130-member National Assembly with a four-year term and a partially elected 51-member Senate (30 members appointed for life by the king, eighteen elected members, the Archbishop of Belgrade, the Bishop of Nis and the crown price) with a six-year term. Elections to the National Assembly were set for May and Senate elections for August.

== Electoral system ==
The 130 members of the National Assembly were elected from party lists in constituencies based on districts and towns, with seats allocated according to population. Each list was required to have at least one candidate that had graduated from university.

Voting was restricted to men over the age of 20 who paid at least 15 dinars in taxation, while candidacy was restricted to literate men aged at least 30 who had paid at least 60 dinars in tax. Civil servants, priests and heads of municipalities were not allowed to run for election.

== Campaign ==
The People's Radical Party and Serbian Progressive Party formed an alliance to contest the elections, even launching a jointly-run newspaper. However, this was opposed by younger members of the Radical Party, who ran as independents in some districts and eventually became the Independent Radical Party.

== Results ==
The Radical–Progressive alliance received around 130,000 votes, while the Independent Radicals received around 40,000 votes and Liberals 30,000.

== Aftermath ==
Although the National Assembly had a four-year term, on 25 March 1903 the king issued a royal proclamation suspending the 1901 constitution and dissolving parliament. He then appointed new members to the Senate. Through a second proclamation 45 minutes later, he reinstated the constitution and called for early elections in May.
