= Naumović =

A patronymic surname derived from the given name Naum.

- Jovan Naumović
- Mihailo Naumović
- Nada Naumović
- Velimir Naumović

== See also ==
- Michaś Naŭmovič (1922–2004), figure of the Belarusian diaspora in France, artist and physiotherapist.
- Naumovich
