= Black Hand (Serbia) =

Serbian secret military society

Unification or Death
- Уједињење или смрт Ujedinjenje ili smrt
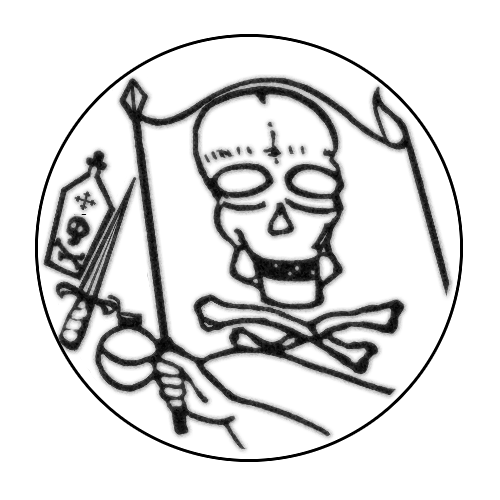
- Unification or Death's logo
- Other name: Black Hand
- Leader: Dragutin Dimitrijević
- Founded: May 1911; 115 years ago (as Unification or Death)
- Active regions: Balkan Peninsula
- Ideology: Greater Serbia; Serbian nationalism

The Black Hand (Црна рука, Crna ruka) or officially Unification or Death (Serbian: Уједињење или смрт, romanized: Ujedinjenje ili smrt) was the name of a secret Serbian nationalist society formed in 1911 by officers in the Army of the Kingdom of Serbia.

The organisation is notable for its involvement in the events leading up to the assassination of Archduke Franz Ferdinand in Sarajevo in 1914, triggering World War I, and had its roots in an informal group lead by Dragutin "Apis" Dimitrijević which was behind the 1903 overthrow of the Serbian government and assassination of King Alexander I of Serbia and Queen Draga.

The society formed to unite all of the territories with a South Slavic majority that were not then ruled by either Serbia or Montenegro. It took inspiration primarily from the unification of Italy in 1859–1870, but also from the unification of Germany in 1871. Through its connections to the June 1914 assassination of Archduke Franz Ferdinand in Sarajevo, carried out by the members of the youth movement Young Bosnia, the Black Hand was instrumental in starting World War I (1914–1918) by precipitating the July Crisis of 1914, which eventually led to Austria-Hungary's invasion of the Kingdom of Serbia in August 1914.

== Related Serbian nationalist groups ==
=== The original Black Hand conspiracy and the May Coup ===
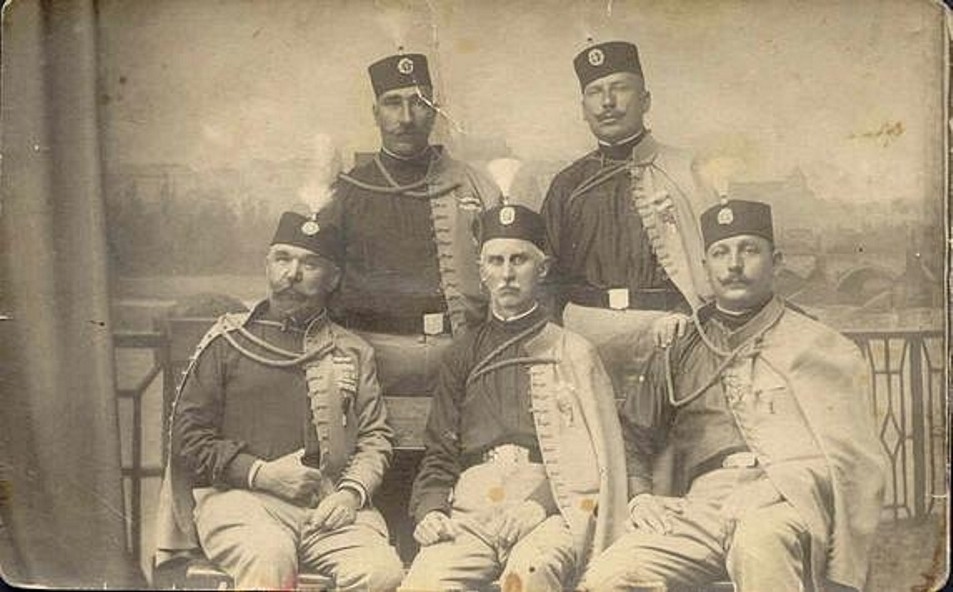
Early members of the Black Hand

In August 1901, a group of lower officers headed by captain Dragutin "Apis" Dimitrijević met to plan a coup against the Obrenović dynasty. This group was also referred to as the Black Hand. The first meeting was held on 6 September 1901. In attendance were captains Radomir Aranđelović, Milan F. Petrović, and Dragutin Dimitrijević, as well as lieutenants Antonije Antić, Dragutin Dulić, Milan Marinković, and Nikodije Popović. On the night of 28/29 May 1903 (Old Style), a group of army officers led by Dimitrijević entered the Old Palace in Belgrade and murdered the King Alexander I Obrenović and Queen Draga, as well as prime Minister Dimitrije Cincar-Marković, Minister of the Army Milovan Pavlović, and General-Adjutant Lazar Petrović. This became known as the May Coup. After the coup, the throne passed to King Peter I of the Karađorđević dynasty.

=== National Defense ===
On 8 October 1908, just two days after Austria annexed Bosnia and Herzegovina, Serbian ministers, officials, and generals held a meeting at the City Hall in Belgrade. They founded a semi-secret society, the Narodna Odbrana ("National Defense") which gave Pan-Serbism a focus and an organisation. The purpose of the group was to liberate Serbs under the Austro-Hungarian occupation. They also shared anti-Austrian propaganda and organized spies and saboteurs to operate within the occupied provinces. Satellite groups were formed in Slovenia, Bosnia, Herzegovina, and Istria. The Bosnian group became deeply associated with local groups of pan-Serb activists such as Mlada Bosna ("Young Bosnia").

== Formation of Unification or Death ==
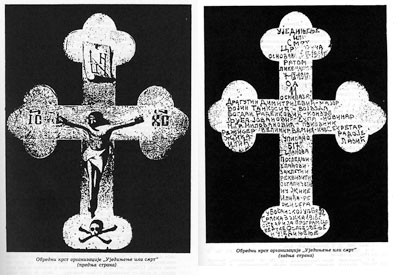
Ritual cross of the Black Hand

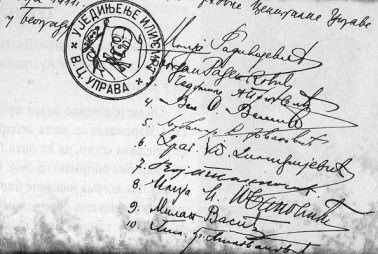
Signatures

Unification or Death was established in the beginning of May 1911. The original constitution was written by Ljuba Čupa, Bogdan Radenković, and Vojislav Tankosić and signed on 9 May.. The organisation was modeled after similar German secret nationalist associations and the Italian Carbonari. The organisation was mentioned in the Serbian parliament as the "Black Hand" in late 1911.

By 1911–12, Narodna Odbrana had established ties with the Black Hand, and the two became "parallel in action and overlapping in membership".

The organisation used the magazine Pijemont (the Serbian name for Piedmont, the kingdom that led the unification of Italy under the House of Savoy) for the dissemination of their ideas. The magazine was founded by Ljuba Čupa in August 1911.

== Activity in 1914 ==
By 1914, the group had hundreds of members, many of them Serbian Army officers. The goal of uniting Serb-inhabited territories was implemented by training guerrilla fighters and saboteurs. The Black Hand was organized at the grassroots level in cells of three to five members, supervised by district committees and by a Central Committee in Belgrade, whose ten-member executive committee was primarily led by Dragutin "Apis" Dimitrijević. To ensure secrecy, members rarely knew much more than the other members of their own cell and one superior above them. New members swore the oath:

I (...), by entering into the society, do hereby swear by the Sun which shineth upon me, by the Earth which feedeth me, by God, by the blood of my forefathers, by my honour and by my life, that from this moment onward and until my death, I shall faithfully serve the task of this organisation and that I shall at all times be prepared to bear for it any sacrifice. I further swear by God, by my honour and by my life, that I shall unconditionally carry into effect all its orders and commands. I further swear by my God, by my honour and by my life, that I shall keep within myself all the secrets of this organisation and carry them with me into my grave. May God and my brothers in this organisation be my judges if at any time I should wittingly fail or break this oath.

The Black Hand took over the terrorist actions of Narodna Odbrana and deliberately worked to obscure any distinctions between the two groups, trading on the prestige and network of the older organisation. Black Hand members held important army and government positions. The group held influence over government appointments and policies. The Serbian government was fairly well-informed of Black Hand activities.

Friendly relations had fairly well cooled by 1914. The Black Hand was displeased with Prime Minister Nikola Pašić and thought that he did not act aggressively enough for the Pan-Serb cause. The Black Hand engaged in a bitter power struggle over several issues, such as who would control territories that Serbia had annexed during the Balkan Wars. By then, disagreeing with the Black Hand was dangerous, as political murder was one of its tools.

In 1914, Apis allegedly decided that Archduke Franz Ferdinand, the heir-apparent of Austria, should be assassinated, as he was trying to pacify the Serbians, which would prevent a revolution if he was successful. Towards that end, three young Bosnian Serbs were allegedly recruited to kill the Archduke. They were certainly trained in bomb throwing and marksmanship by current and former members of the Serbian military. Gavrilo Princip, Nedeljko Čabrinović, and Trifko Grabež were smuggled across the border back into Bosnia using a chain of contacts. The decision to kill the Archduke was initiated by Apis and not sanctioned by the full Executive Committee (if Apis was involved at all, a question that remains in dispute).

== Legacy ==
In 1938, Konspiracija, a conspiracy group to overthrow the Yugoslav regency was founded by, among others, members of the Serbian Cultural Club (SKK). The organisation was modeled after the Black Hand, including the recruitment process. Two members of the Black Hand, Antonije Antić and Velimir Vemić, were the organisation's military advisors.

== See also ==
- Secret society
- Serb revolutionary organisations
- Serbian Chetnik organisation

== Sources ==
- Antić, Antonije (20 November 2010). "Škola gnezdo zavere". Novosti.
- Apis, Dragutin T. Dimitrijević (1918). Tajna prevratna organizacija. Velika Srbija.
- Dedijer, Vladimir (1966). The Road to Sarajevo. Simon and Schuster.
- Kazimirović, Vasa (1995). Srbija i Jugoslavija, 1914–1945: Srbija i Jugoslavija između dva svetska rata. Prizma. ISBN 978-8670840010.
- Kazimirović, Vasa (1997). Crna ruka: ličnosti i događaji u Srbiji od prevrata 1903. do Solunskog procesa 1917. godine. Prizma. ISBN 978-8670840164.
- MacKenzie, David (1995). The "Black Hand" on Trial: Salonika, 1917. East European Monographs. ISBN 978-0880333207.
- MacKenzie, David (1998). The Exoneration of the "Black Hand," 1917–1953. East European Monographs. ISBN 978-0880334143.
- MacKenzie, David (1989). Apis, the Congenial Conspirator: The Life of Colonel Dragutin T. Dimitrijević. East European Monographs. ISBN 978-0880331623.
- MacKenzie, David (1982). "Serbian Nationalist and Military Organizations and the Piedmont Idea, 1844–1914". East European Quarterly. 16 (3): 323–.
- Remak, Joachim (1971). The Origins of World War I: 1871–1914. Holt, Rinehart and Winston. ISBN 978-0136427445.
- Zečević, Momčilo (2003). Prošlost i vreme: iz istorije Jugoslavije. Prosveta. ISBN 978-8607013937.
