= May Coup (Serbia) =

1903 military coup against King Alexander I of Serbia; Peter I installed

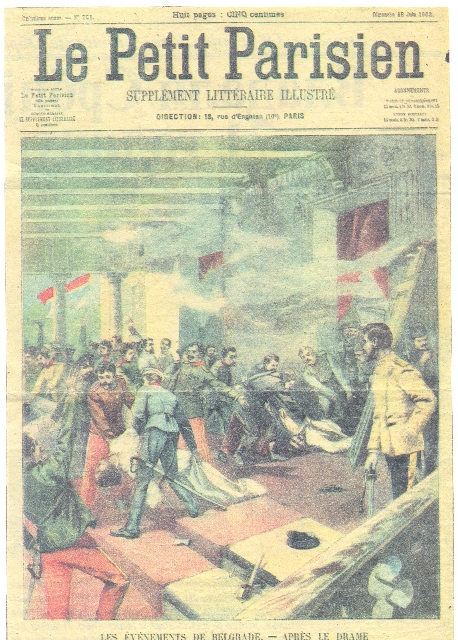
- Illustration of the May Coup published in 1903 in the French newspaper Le Petit Parisien
- Native name: Мајски преврат, Majski prevrat
- Date: 10–11 June [O.S. 28–29 May] 1903
- Location: Belgrade, Kingdom of Serbia
- Also known as: May Overthrow
- Type: Military coup, regicide, assassination
- Motive: Regime change
- Target: Stari Dvor, Belgrade
- Organised by: Dragutin Dimitrijević and other officers
- Participants: Officer faction within the Serbian army
- Outcome: Success: Assassination of King Alexander I, Queen Draga, her brothers Nikodije and Nikola, Prime Minister Dimitrije Cincar-Marković, with the murder of Adjutant Lazar Petrović; Accession of King Peter I and the Karađorđević dynasty to the throne
- Burial: Church of Saint Mark (Royal couple)

The May Coup (Serbian: Мајски преврат, romanized: Majski prevrat) was a coup d'état in the Kingdom of Serbia which resulted in the assassination of King Alexander I and his consort, Queen Draga, inside the Stari Dvor in Belgrade on the night of 10–11 June [O.S. 28–29 May] 1903. This act resulted in the end of the Obrenović dynasty that had ruled Serbia since the mid-19th century. A group of Serbian army officers led by Captain Dragutin Dimitrijević (Apis) organized the assassination. After the May Coup, the throne passed to King Peter I of the Karađorđević dynasty.

Along with the royal couple, the conspirators killed prime minister Dimitrije Cincar-Marković, minister of the army Milovan Pavlović, and general-adjutant Lazar Petrović. The coup had a significant influence on Serbia's relations with other European powers; the Obrenović dynasty had mostly allied with Austria-Hungary, while the Karađorđević dynasty had close ties with both Russia and France. Each dynasty received ongoing financial support from their powerful foreign sponsors.

== Background ==
When Serbia gained independence from Ottoman control following the Serbian Revolution in 1804 to 1835, it emerged as an independent principality ruled by various factions surrounding the Obrenović and Karađordević dynasties. They, in turn, were sponsored by the rival Austro-Hungarian and Russian empires. The Obrenović family was mostly pro-Austrian, and their hereditary enemies, the Karađordević family, was mostly pro-Russian. Each dynasty was financially aided by their powerful foreign sponsors.

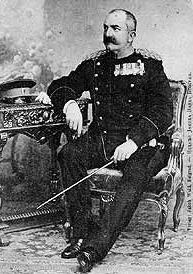
King Milan Obrenović

After the assassination of Prince Mihailo Obrenović on 29 May 1868 (Old Style), his cousin, Milan Obrenović, became the newly-elected Serbian prince. Milan was married to Natalie Keshko, a Moldavian boyar's daughter. He was an autocratic ruler and unpopular among the people. During his rule, Serbia re-emerged as an independent country and gained territory at the 1878 Congress of Berlin.

Since Russia gave its support to Bulgaria at the Treaty of San Stefano, King Milan relied on Austria-Hungary as his ally. He proclaimed himself King in 1882. His military defeats in the Serbo-Bulgarian War and the Timok Rebellion, led by elements of the People's Radical Party, were serious blows to his popularity.

The situation was compounded by quarrels between the King and the Queen. King Milan was not a faithful husband and Queen Natalija was greatly influenced by Russia. Mismatched both personally and politically, the couple separated in 1886. Queen Natalija withdrew from the kingdom, taking with her the ten-year-old Prince Alexander (later King Alexander I). While she was residing in Wiesbaden in 1888, King Milan was successful in recovering the Crown Prince, whom he undertook to educate. In response to the queen's objections, Milan exerted considerable pressure upon the Metropolitan and obtained a divorce which was later declared illegal.

On 3 January 1889, Milan adopted the new constitution which was much more liberal than the existing 1869 Constitution. Two months later, on 6 March, Milan suddenly abdicated the throne in favor of his son. No satisfactory reason was given for that step. Upon the abdication, former King Milan established a regency to rule in the name of young King Alexander and retired to Paris to live as an ordinary citizen. Members of the regency were Jovan Ristić, General Kosta Protić and General Jovan Belimarković. The Radicals were forgiven and allowed to return to political life. The Radical Sava Grujić formed a new government, which was succeeded by the Government of Nikola Pašić, the leader of the Radical Party. After King Milan's pro-Austrian policy, the Radical-led Government became closer to the Russian Empire. In the summer of 1891, Prince Alexander and Pašić visited Tsar Alexander III. The Tsar promised that Russia would not allow Austro-Hungarian annexation of Bosnia and Herzegovina and that Russia would support Serbian interests in "Old Serbia" and Macedonia.

Alexander's mother, former queen Natalija, who was in the process of divorcing Milan and was banished from Belgrade, upon Alexander's request went to the French coastal resort Biarritz together with her lady-in-waiting and the future queen Draga Mašin.

After the death of the Regent Protić on 4 June 1892, a conflict emerged between Pašić, who wanted the vacant position in the regency for himself, and the Regent Ristić, who disliked Pašić. In 1892, Ristić transferred the government to the Liberal Party, the party he had always been linked with, and appointed Jovan Avakumović as the new prime minister. This step and the subsequent conduct of the Liberal politicians caused serious discontent in the country. On the 1st (13th) of April 1893, Prince Alexander, by a successful stratagem, imprisoned the regents and the ministers in the palace and, declaring himself of age, called the Radicals to office. In quick succession, the new prime ministers were Radicals Lazar Dokić, Sava Grujić, Đorđe Simić and Svetomir Nikolajević. One of the guardsmen that helped Alexander imprison the regents and the ministers was colonel Lazar "Laza" Petrović.

At the beginning of his reign, King Alexander was prescribing a program of Government in matters of the military, the economical and the financial life of the state. He disapproved an unprincipled party competition and in order to suppress the Radicals, on 9 January, he invited his father back to Serbia. The Radical Government immediately resigned and moved into opposition. The influence of former king Milan in state affairs could be seen immediately after his return to Serbia.

King Alexander tried to keep a policy of neutral governments but he did not have much success. Therefore, on 9 May 1894 he conducted another coup, abolished the Constitution from 1888, and put into force the old one from 1869. Milan's return to Serbia did not last long because he quickly got into a conflict with his son. A week after his departure, Queen Natalija was allowed to return to Serbia. Natalija invited Alexander to come to Biarritz. When he visited his mother, he met Draga, 9 years his senior, and immediately fell in love with her. Natalija knew about the affair but did not pay much attention to it, believing that it would be short-lived.

In the meantime, the progressivist Stojan Novaković formed a new government. On his father's command, King Alexander visited Vienna where, as a sign of Austro-Serbian friendship, he awarded the Austrian minister of finance Béni Kállay, who was also the minister for Bosnia and Herzegovina. This was poorly received in Serbia because of the belief that Austria-Hungary wanted to annex Bosnia and Herzegovina.

=== Marriage to Draga Mašin Lunjevica ===
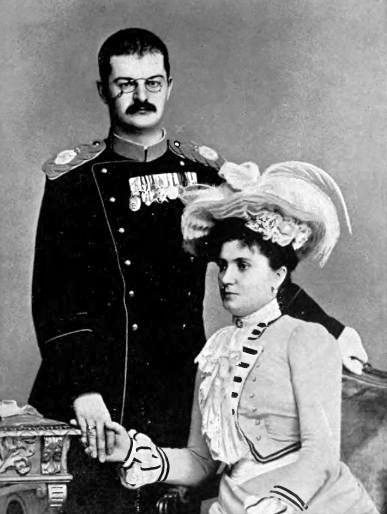
King Alexander I and Queen Draga

King Alexander invited his father to return once more to Serbia. Upon the arrival of former King Milan in Serbia on 7 October 1897, a new Government was formed with Vladan Đorđević as the new prime minister. Milan was appointed to the position of Supreme Commander of the Active Army of the Kingdom of Serbia. Together with the new Government, Milan tried to find a suitable princess from some Western court to become Alexander's bride, not knowing that Alexander was already meeting regularly with Draga.

Due to the growing involvement of former king Milan in daily Serbian political life, and especially due to his anti-Radical policy, an unemployed worker tried to assassinate Milan on 24 June 1899, resulting in Milan to begin reckoning with the Radicals in every way. However, Alexander now had to find a way to get rid of his father so that he could marry Draga. He decided to send King Milan and Prime Minister Đorđević outside the country. Under the pretext of negotiating his marriage to the German Princess Alexandra Caroline zu Schaumburg-Lippe, sister of Queen Charlotte of Württemberg, Alexander sent his father to Karlsbad and Prime Minister Đorđević to Marienbad to sign a contract with Austria-Hungary. As soon as he removed the opponents, Alexander was able to announce his engagement to Draga Mašin.

King Alexander's popularity further declined after his marriage to Draga, the former lady-in-waiting of his mother Queen Natalija and widow of engineer Svetozar Mašin. Draga was nine years older than Alexander. At that time, it was very unusual for a king or heir to the throne to marry a woman who was not a member of the nobility. Alexander's father, the former King Milan, did not approve of the marriage and refused to return to Serbia. He died in Vienna in 1901. Another opponent of the marriage was the dowager queen Natalija, who wrote a letter to Alexander containing all of the ugliest rumors regarding Draga circulating in Russia. Minister of foreign affairs Andra Đorđević visited Jakov Pavlović, archbishop of Belgrade and metropolitan of Serbia, and asked him to refuse to grant his blessing. Alexander also visited the metropolitan and threatened that he would abdicate if he could not receive his blessing. As a sign of protest, the entire Đorđević government resigned. Among the fiercest opponents to the marriage was Đorđe Genčić, minister of the interior in Đorđević's government. Because of Genčić's public condemnation of the engagement, Alexander had him jailed for seven years. The situation was resolved by Russian tsar Nicholas II, who agreed to be Alexander's honorary best man.

The wedding took place on 23 July 1900. One of the officers in the procession was Dragutin Dimitrijević Apis. With strained relations with the outside world because of his unpopular marriage, King Alexander's foreign policy turned to Russia. The king had previously released the Radicals from prison who had been accused of backing the Ivandan assassination attempt on former King Milan.

After the death of his father Milan, King Alexander, as a sign of goodwill because of the queen's alleged pregnancy (a public secret existed that she was actually sterile since an accident in her youth, which Alexander refused to believe), pardoned all political prisoners, including Đorđe Genčić and the remaining Radicals. On 20 March 1901, he assembled a new government led by the Radical Mihailo Vujić. The government consisted of representatives from the People's Radical Party and the Liberal Party. King Alexander then enacted a new octroyed constitution, with its main feature the introduction of a bicameral system consisting of the Senate (upper house) and the National Assembly (lower house). The new constitution gave the monarch the right to appoint the majority of the senators, who would defend his interests.

The false pregnancy of Queen Draga created a major problem for King Alexander. The first reaction came from the Russian tsar, who did not want to receive the king and queen upon their planned visit to Russia. Alexander blamed Radicals for it, instigated a new coup, and installed a government headed by general Dimitrije Cincar-Marković on 6 November 1902.

Because of increasing repulsion by the Russian court, King Alexander again tried to approach Austria in the autumn of 1902. He had taken some earlier steps in January 1902 when he sent his personal secretary to Vienna with the promise that it would solve the question of his successor in agreement with the neighbouring monarchy by adopting one of the descendants of the female line of Obrenovićs living in Austria-Hungary. Draga believed that Alexander should adopt her brother Nikodije Lunjevica for the succession.

Dimitrije Tucović organized a rally of dissatisfied workers and students on 23 March 1903, which escalated to open conflict with the police and the army, resulting in the deaths of six people. Knowing that he would not be able to win new elections, the king staged two coups within one hour. With the first coup, Alexander abolished his octroyed constitution and disbanded the Senate and National Assembly. Then the king appointed new members to the Senate, the state council and the courts. In the second coup, the king restored the constitution that he had abolished just a few hours earlier. Following this, the government held elections on 18 May 1903 (31 May by the Gregorian calendar), which the government won. This was the final political victory for King Alexander I.

== Army officers' conspiracy ==
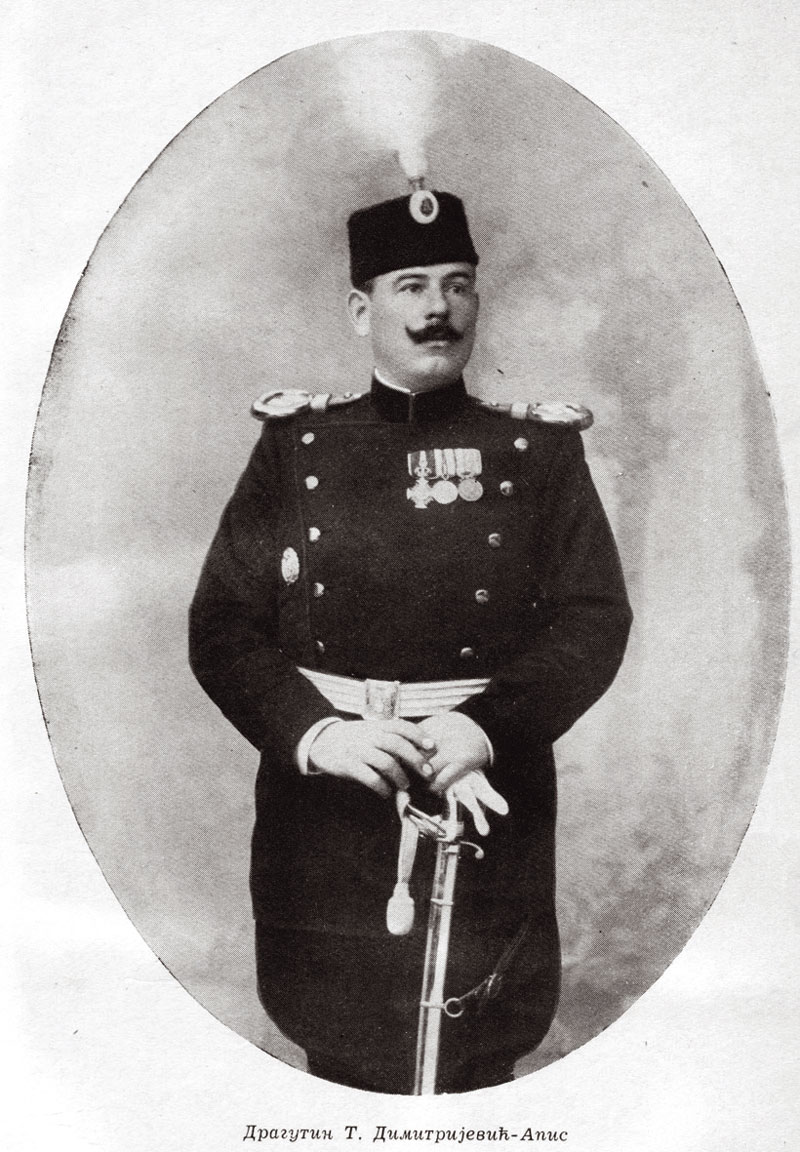
Dragutin Dimitrijević, one of the chief conspirators

Junior officers had complained that the queen's false pregnancy diminished the international reputation of Serbia. They were also unhappy with the constant temper tantrums thrown by her brother Nikola Lunjevica, himself a junior military officer who once killed a policeman whilst drunk. Nikola, as the king's brother-in-law, had also demanded that senior officers report and salute to him.

In August 1901, cavalry lieutenant Antonije Antić (Genčić's nephew), captains Radomir Aranđelović and Milan Petrović and lieutenants Dragutin Dimitrijević Apis and Dragutin Dulić organised a plot to assassinate the king and queen.

The first meeting was on 6 September 1901 in Lieutenant Antić's apartment. Later, lieutenant Milan Marinković and lieutenant Nikodije Popović joined the conspiracy. According to the original plan, Alexander and Draga were to be killed by knives dipped in potassium cyanide at a party at Kolarac Endowment for the queen's birthday on 11 September, but the plan failed because the royal couple never arrived. After the details of the plot were disseminated among the military ranks, the conspirators decided to acquaint other politicians and citizens with their intentions. The plot was first introduced to Đorđe Genčić, who discussed the idea with foreign representatives in Belgrade and also travelled abroad trying to learn how to create changes to the Serbian throne if the king died without children. Austria-Hungary did not intend to nominate any of its princes, as it expected difficulties and obstacles to be put forward by Russia. Russia, for the same reasons, fearing resistance from Vienna, was not willing to outsource one of its own princes. Among the conspirators was Aleksandar Mašin, a retired staff colonel and brother of Draga's first husband.

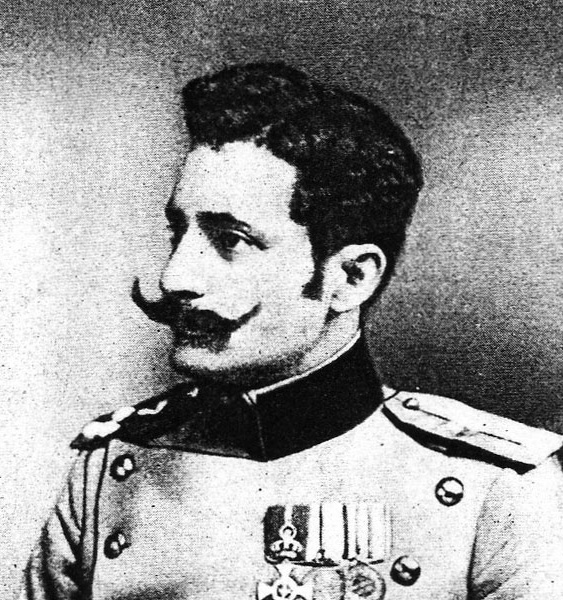
Vojislav Tankosić commanded the firing squad that shot Queen Draga's brothers Nikola and Nikodije Lunjevica

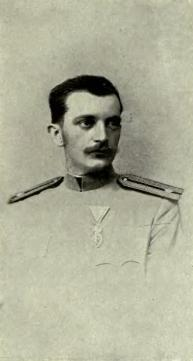
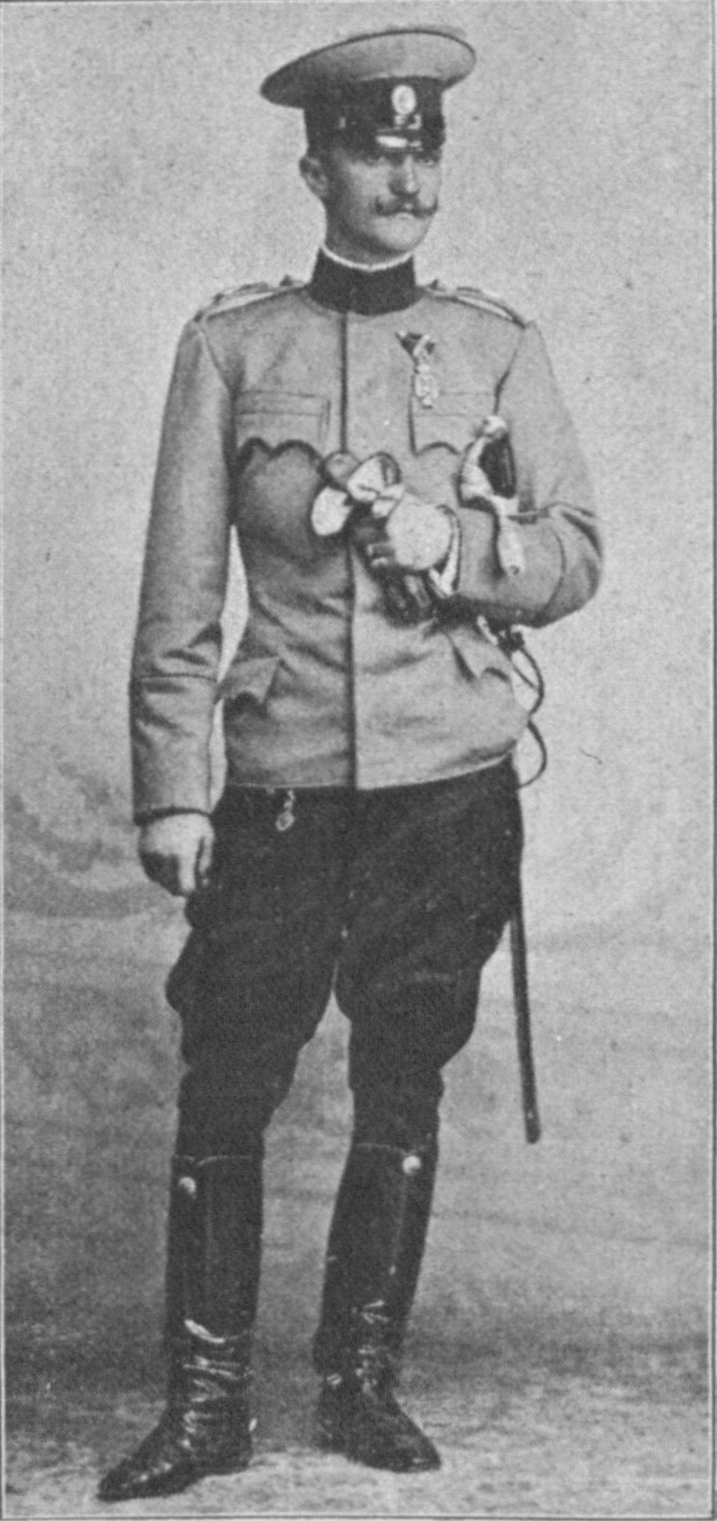
Nikola (left) and Nikodije (right) Lunjevica

Prince Mirko of Montenegro was one of the potential candidates for the Serbian throne. However, Peter Karađorđević, who lived as an ordinary citizen in Geneva, became the preferred option. Therefore, Nikola Hadži Toma, a merchant from Belgrade, was introduced into the plot and sent to Switzerland to meet with Peter to acquaint him with the conspiracy. Peter did not want to commit himself to regicide. Influenced by his views, a group of older conspirators headed by general Jovan Atanacković proposed that King Alexander be forced to abdicate the throne and then sent into exile. However captain Dragutin Dimitrijević argued that Alexander's survival might trigger a civil war. It was therefore decided that the king and queen should be assassinated.

After another failed attempt to kill the royal couple on the 50th anniversary celebration of the Belgrade Choral Society, the group resolved to stage the killing in the palace. They also recruited officers of the Royal Guard. Lieutenant colonel Mihailo Naumović agreed to take part in the plot. He was a grandson of Karađorđe's bodyguard Naum Krnar, who had been killed with Karađorđe in Radovanje Grove in 1817 by order of Miloš Obrenović.

Rumors about the plot reached the public, but at first the king dismissed them as false propaganda. Eventually, a few officers were brought before the military court but were acquitted for lack of evidence. Fearing that they could be discovered, conspirators decided to act on the first occasion when Naumović would be in command at the palace, the night of 28–29 May (Old Style).

== The assassination ==
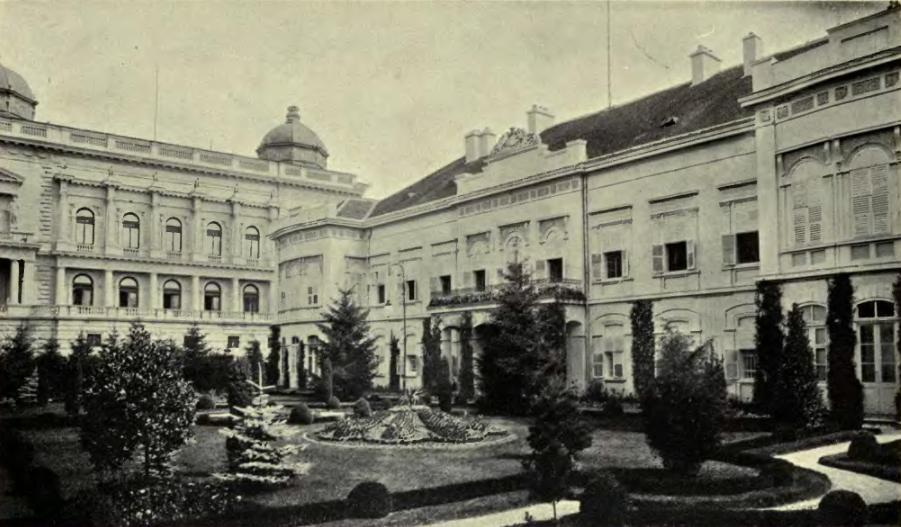
Stari Dvor, Belgrade

The conspirators from the interior arrived to Belgrade the day before, under various pretexts. Together with their Belgrade comrades, they were divided into five groups and spent the early evening drinking in various hotels in the town, before gathering in the Officers Club. That night King Alexander had dinner with his ministers and the queen's family. Naumović gave a sign to the conspirators that the royal couple was asleep by sending one of his subordinates to bring his tippet from his home. After midnight, Captain Apis led most of the officers in the conspiracy to the royal palace. At the same time, Colonel Mašin went to the 12th Infantry barracks to take command of the troops there. Lieutenant Colonel Mišić prepared to bring his 11th Infantry regiment to the palace.

Several groups of the conspirators surrounded the houses of prime minister Dimitrije Cincar-Marković and senior officers loyal to King Alexander. Guard lieutenant Petar Živković, on duty that night, unlocked the gate of the royal palace at 2:00 a.m. As the conspirators, led by Petar Mišić entered the building, the electric lighting was switched off throughout the palace. While several officers of the Royal Guard were involved in the plot, the majority of the guards on duty were not. However, in the darkness and confusion, they did not attempt an effective defense. A search for the royal couple was unsuccessful for nearly two hours. During this time, captain Jovan Miljković, an aide familiar with the conspiracy but who refused to participate, and Mihailo Naumović (unknown to the conspirators) were killed. The doors to the king's bedroom were shattered with dynamite, but no one was in the bed. Unknown to the others, Apis spotted someone escaping down the stairs into the courtyard. He thought it was the king and ran after him, but it was one of the king's loyal guardsmen. In the gunfight that erupted, Apis was wounded with three bullets to his chest, surviving only because of his strong constitution.

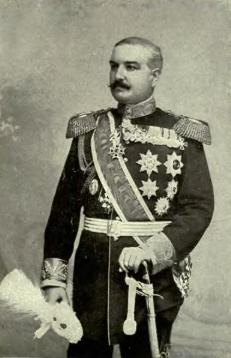
General Lazar Petrović

Nervous because of the failure of the search, the approaching dawn and the disappearance of Apis, who was lying wounded in the basement of the palace, the conspirators believed that the plot had failed. They had soldiers bring the king's first aide-de-camp, general Lazar Petrović, who had been captured as soon as the conspirators entered the courtyard. He was ordered to reveal whether there was a secret room or passageway, under the threat of death if he failed to comply within ten minutes. Petrović waited in silence for the expiration of the deadline.

The subsequent course of events is not precisely known. According to one version, the officers again entered the royal bed chamber where cavalry lieutenant Velimir Vemić observed a recess in the wall that appeared to be the keyhole of a secret door. The king and queen were hidden there. According to another version, which was partially accepted for the script of the television series The End of the Obrenović Dynasty, the king and queen were hiding behind the mirror in the bedroom where there was a small room used for the queen's wardrobe. Cupboards covered a hole in the floor that was the entrance to a secret passage (which allegedly led to the Russian embassy located opposite the palace).

As the conspirators called for him to emerge, Alexander demanded from his hiding place that the officers confirm their oath of loyalty. According to one version of events, they did so. According to another, they threatened to bomb the palace if Alexander did not open the passage. After Alexander and Draga, who were only partially dressed, emerged, artillery captain Mihailo Ristić fired at them using all the bullets in his revolver, followed by Vemić and captain Ilija Radivojević. The king fell dead from the first shot. The queen tried to save his life by protecting his body with her own. General Petrović was killed immediately afterward.

It is known with certainty that the king and queen were eventually discovered hiding inside a wardrobe and were then both savagely killed. Their bodies were mutilated and tossed from a second-floor window onto piles of manure. Diplomatic correspondent, historian and author C.L. Sulzberger relates an account relayed to him by a friend who had participated in the assassination under Captain Apis: the assassination squad "burst into the little palace, found the king and queen cowering in a closet (both in silken nightgowns), stabbed them and chucked them out the window onto garden manure heaps, hacking off Alexander's fingers when he clung desperately to the sill". This account would indicate that King Alexander was killed after he had been thrown from the palace window. The assassination of King Alexander coincided with the 35th anniversary of the assassination of his predecessor Prince Mihajlo. The remains of the royal couple were buried in the Church of Saint Mark.

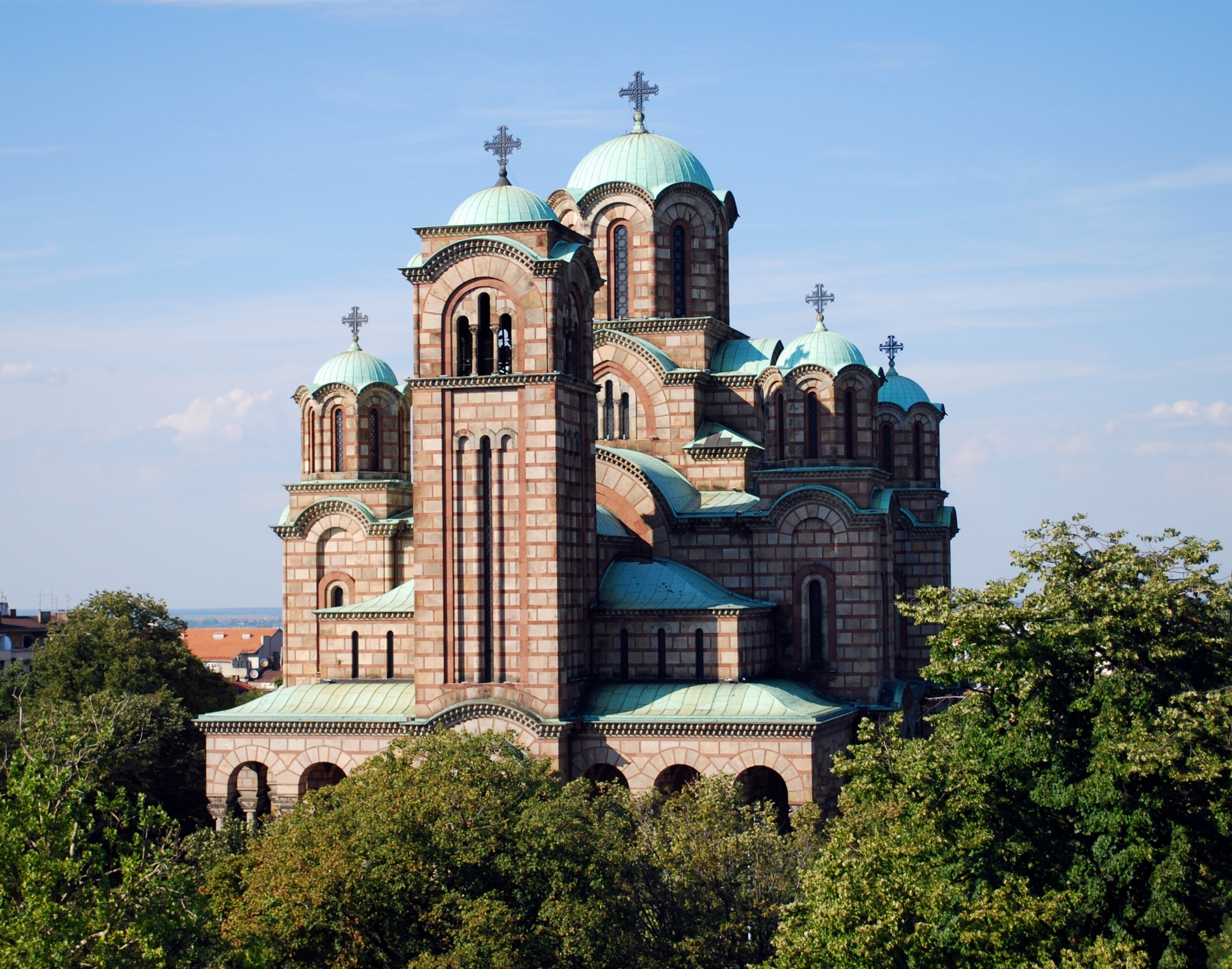
The Church of Saint Mark, where the royal couple are buried

That same night, the queen's brothers Nikola and Nikodije Ljunjevica were arrested and executed by a firing squad commanded by lieutenant Vojislav Tankosić. Prime minister general Dimitrije Cincar-Marković and minister of the army general Milovan Pavlović were killed in their homes. The third member of Cincar-Marković's government, interior minister Velimir Todorović, who was also marked to be killed, was instead severely wounded and lived until 1920.

== Aftermath ==
King Peter I after his coronation (on 21 September 1904)

Members of the new interim government soon gathered under the presidency of Jovan Avakumović. Aleksandar Mašin was appointed minister of civil engineering, Jovan Atanacković was appointed minister of the army, while Đorđe Genčić became minister of the economy. Besides conspirators, members of the new government were: Radical Stojan Protić, Liberal Vojislav Veljković, leaders of the Serbian Independent Radical Party Ljubomir Stojanović and Ljubomir Živković and progressivist Ljubomir Kaljević. Nikola Pašić, Stojan Ribarac and Jovan Žujović were also considered members of the new government but were absent from Belgrade at the time of the overthrow.

The National Assembly conducted a session on 4 June 1903, voted Peter Karađorđević as king of Serbia and elected the mission that went to Geneva to retrieve him. He ascended the Serbian throne as Peter I.

The news of the coup was received with mixed feelings by the Serbs. Many who had blamed the king for the situation in the country were satisfied, while those who had supported him were disappointed. In parliamentary elections a few days before the coup, the king's candidate had received a full majority. Angry elements within the army mutinied in Niš in 1904, taking control of the Nišava District in support of the fallen king, demanding that the assassins be tried for their crimes. Their aim was also to show that the army as a whole was not responsible for the May Coup. Seen as a supporter of the Obrenović dynasty by the conspirators, (having been one of King Alexander's adjutants and also close to his father King Milan), the future Vojvoda Živojin Mišić was forced into retirement in 1904.

=== International outrage and boycott ===
International outrage over the coup came swiftly. Russia and Austria-Hungary vehemently condemned the brutal assassination. Great Britain and the Netherlands withdrew their ambassadors from Serbia, thus freezing diplomatic relations, and imposed sanctions, which were not abolished until 1905. British prime minister Arthur Balfour publicly condemned the assassinations, saying that British ambassador Sir George Bonham was only accredited in front of King Alexander, and thus with the king's death, relations between Britain and Serbia were terminated. Bonham left Serbia on 21 June. The British government demanded that Belgrade punish the regicides as a sign of diplomacy. However, the conspirators were so powerful that it was unrealistic for the Serbian government to act on British demands.

Austrian ambassador Konstantin Dumba persuaded Austrian foreign minister Agenor Gołuchowski to coordinate with Russian foreign minister Vladimir Lamsdorf to diplomatically boycott Serbia until officers involved in the coup were removed from influential positions in the government and the army. The boycott had an almost complete success. By January 1904, only the ambassadors of the Kingdom of Greece and the Ottoman Empire remained within Serbia.

As a result, the new King Peter decided to remove from court the aides-de-camp who had taken part in the coup, while at the same time promoting them to higher positions. Aleksandar Mašin became acting chief of staff, while Colonel Čedomilj Popović became commander of the Danube division. This satisfied Russia, which returned its ambassador and was followed by other states, leaving only Britain and the Netherlands in boycotting the new Serbian government.

During this time, Serbian statesmen became increasingly nervous because of Britain's refusal to reestablish diplomatic relations, especially after the Ilinden Uprising and because of the deteriorating situation in Macedonia. The government of Ljubomir Stojanović was ready to fulfill British demands, but it was Nikola Pašić's government that finally did so. The conspirators were brought to trial, which forced some into early retirement. Other junior conspirators were never punished for their complicity in the assassination. Dimitrijević was later promoted to the rank of colonel and served as an officer in the intelligence sector of the Serbian army. British-Serbian diplomatic relations were renewed by a decree signed by King Edward VII three years after the May Coup.

After the coup, life in Serbia continued as before, with King Peter exerting a minimal interference in politics, not wishing to oppose the Black Hand, which had become increasingly powerful. The deterioration in external relations between Serbia and Austria-Hungary led to the Pig War (also known as the Customs War) of 1906–08 from which Serbia emerged as the victor. With most senior conspirators forced into retirement, Dimitrijević became the de facto leader of the conspirators. In 1914, the Black Hand ordered the assassination of Archduke Franz Ferdinand in Sarajevo, executed by members of Young Bosnia, which was used by Austria-Hungary as a basis for launching World War I.

Dimitrijević and the Black Hand were later involved in another scandal. Nikola Pašić wished to expel the most prominent members of the Black Hand movement, by then officially disbanded. Dimitrijević and several of his military colleagues were arrested and tried on false charges of the attempted assassination of regent Alexander I Karađorđević. On 23 May 1917, following the Salonika Trial, Colonel Dimitrijević, Major Ljubomir Vulović and Rade Malobabić were found guilty of treason and sentenced to death. A month later, on 11, 24 or 27 June, they were executed by firing squad. After World War II, Apis and his associates were rehabilitated in a mock trial staged for propaganda purposes by the communist government. However, most historians agree that the men were guilty of the attempted assassination of the prince.

== Reactions ==
- Principality of Montenegro: According to Bolati, the Montenegrin court of Nicholas I did not grieve for late King Alexander, as they saw him as an enemy of Montenegro and obstacle to the unification of Serbdom. "Although it wasn't said openly, it was thought that the Petrović-Njegoš dynasty would achieve [the unification]. All procedures of Nicholas I shows that he himself believed that".

== Legacy ==
- The coup is the main theme of the 1995 Serbian TV series, The End of the Obrenović Dynasty.
- The coup is the main theme of Dobrilo Nenadić's 2006 Serbian historical novel Ermine.

== See also ==
- Serbian Revolution
- Alexander I of Serbia
- Black Hand
- White Hand
- Young Bosnia
- Assassination of Archduke Franz Ferdinand
- Salonika Trial

== Sources ==
- , The original source for the text of this article
- C. L. Sulzberger The Fall of Eagles, Crown Publishers, Inc., New York, 1977
- Christopher Clark The Sleepwalkers: How Europe Went to War in 1914, Harper Perennial, New York, 2013
