= Velimir Vemić =

Velimir Vemić (Serbian Cyrillic: Велимир Вемић 1870 – after 1938) was a Serbian officer. He was sentenced to 20 years in prison at the Salonika trail in 1917 for his participation in the Black Hand, and his role in the assassination of King Aleksandar Obrenović and his wife Draga Mašin and for firing the first shot.

== In the Balkan Wars ==
In the Balkan Wars (1912-1913) he served as a cavalry officer with the rank of major. He attracted great public attention when, during the First Balkan War, he killed a soldier from his unit without trial. Since the court proceedings against Vemić were not initiated in a timely manner, Social Democratic MPs Dragiša Lapčević and Triša Kaclerović submitted an interpellation to the Minister of War in early June 1913, demanding an appropriate punishment for this crime. In this connection, "Radničke novine" also published the article "Killing soldiers" on 11 June 1913. When the Supreme Military Court sentenced Vemić to 10 months in prison, some bourgeois papers stood up in his defense. This was the reason for Dimitrije Tucović to publish the article "Killing of Soldiers" in "Radnički novine" dated 7 November 1913.

== Post-War Period ==
When journalist Luigi Albertini wrote his investigation into the origins of the First World War in the 1930s, many participants were still alive to be interviewed about their recollections of those tragic moments. He questioned the surviving members of the Black hand, Velimir Vemić, Čedomir A. Popović, Vladimir Tucović, and Božin Simić in November 1937 about the events that took place in the first decades of the 20th century. According to them, what British historian Robert Seton-Watson wrote regarding the Black Hand that it "favored concessions to Bulgarians" was absolutely false. In fact, the Black Hand was strongly opposed to any kind of concessions whatsoever.

The diary of Velimir Vemić is one of the few primary sources of events that took place during the May Coup in 1903 until the assassination of Archduke Franz Ferdinand in Sarajevo in 1914.
