= Bašino Selo =

Bašino Selo Башино Село
- Village
- Location within North Macedonia
- Coordinates: 41.748543°N 21.759651°E
- Country: North Macedonia
- Region: Vardar
- Municipality: Veles

Population (2002)
  - Total: 814
- Time zone: UTC+1 (CET)
  - Summer (DST): UTC+2 (CEST)
- Car plates: VE
- Website: .

Bašino Selo (Macedonian: Башино Село) is a village located in the municipality of Veles, North Macedonia.

== Demographics ==
The Yugoslav census of 1953 recorded 571 people of whom 537 were Macedonians, 19 Albanians and 15 others. The 1961 Yugoslav census recorded 591 people of whom 575 were Macedonians, 3 Albanians, 1 Turk and 12 others. The 1971 census recorded 594 people of whom 566 were Macedonians, 14 Albanians and 14 others. The 1981 Yugoslav census recorded 674 people of whom 652 were Macedonians and 22 others. The Macedonian census of 1994 recorded 775 people of whom 765 were Macedonians and 10 others.

According to the 2002 census, the village had a total of 814 inhabitants. Ethnic groups in the village include:

- Macedonians 802
- Serbs 8
- Aromanians 1
- Others 3

== Sports ==
The local football club FK Ilinden 1955 Bašino plays in the Macedonian Third Football League.
