= Officers Club, Belgrade =

Coordinates: 44.8062°N 20.4642°E

The Officers Club
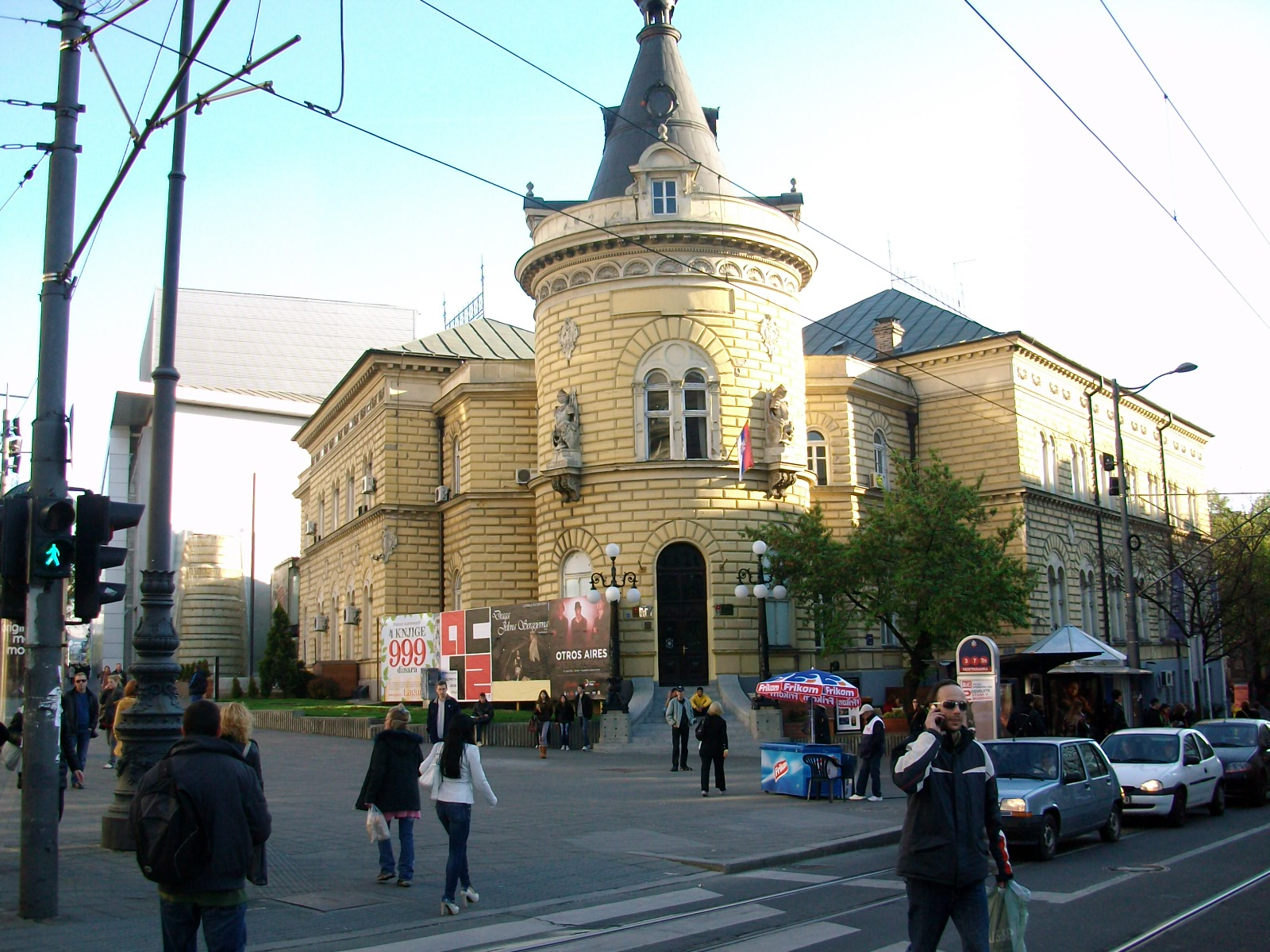
- Interactive map of the The Officers Club area

General information
- Status: Cultural Heritage
- Location: Belgrade, Serbia, Kalemegdan 14
- Completed: 1895

Website
- http://beogradskonasledje.rs/

The Officers Club (Serbian: Зграда Официрског дома, romanized: Zgrada Oficirskog doma) in Belgrade, Serbia is situated at 48 Kralja Milana Street and as the memorial of the development of Belgrade at the end of the 19th century, it has the status of a cultural monument.

== History ==
It was built in 1895, after the design of the architects Јоvan Ilkić and Мilorad Ruvidić. It is a jagged structure, both in the base and in the masses, with a ground floor and the first floor. The basic motif of the building is the corner facade, which sticks out like a tower with circular basis, ending with the peaky dome above the circular entrance vestibules. The stairway to the first floor continues from the vestibule, and in the right wing there is a large hall with the gallery for entertainment. The style in which the building was designed can be referred to as the late Romanticism, with the applied elements from the early renaissance, with the use of the rustic in all surfaces, as well as double windows connected with the common arch. This form speaks about the influence of the Ilkić's professor Hansen, that is, the neo-Byzantine style. The corner part is the richest in decoration. The central room of the club is the entertainment hall in the right wing. The building was reconstructed after World War II, when the design of the basis was changed.

The officers club was built on demand of King Aleksandar Obrenović, in order to provide a place for the Royal Serbian Army officers to gather and have fun. The Officers' club building, initially, thanks to its cornered position and to the characteristic architecture that looks like a fortress, is related to the period of the strengthening of the Serbian country after the proclamation of the kingdom, as well as to the tradition of the area where, in the 19th century, a lot of military objects were situated (the Old Miloš's barracks, Маnjež, The 7th Regiment's Barracks etc.) The club served as the place for recreation of the officers, organization of the balls and exhibitions.

The building was assigned to the University of Belgrade in 1968. In the after-war reconstruction, from 1969 to 1971, for the needs of the Students Cultural Centre, the interior is changed, both in structural and in design sense. The original corner entrance was closed, and a new spacious entrance with a hall was opened from the Resavska Street.

== Literature ==
- Ђурић-Замоло, Дивна (1981). Градитељи Београда, 1815-1914. Монографије = Monographs. Београд: Музеј града Београда. ISBN 978-86-80619-51-4.
