= Đorđe Genčić =

Serbian politician (1861–1938)

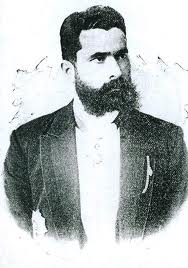

Đorđe Genčić (Serbian: Ђорђе Генчић; 16 November 1861 – 19 October 1938) was a Serbian and Yugoslav industrialist and politician. He served as the Mayor of Niš (1894-1899), Minister of Internal Affairs (1899-1900) and the Minister of National Economy (1903). He was a political leader of the May Coup which brought an end to the Obrenović dynasty.

== Biography ==
Genčić was born in the village of Veliki Izvor near Zaječar in 1861 to a rich family. After finishing high school studies in Zaječar and Belgrade, he studied economics in Vienna and later he went to Russia after being invited by Mikhail Chernyayev to study military sciences. After a few years, he was made a Russian guard officer, and during his service in the Russian Army, he was promoted to the rank of captain.

Upon his return, he worked in Niš as the city administrator (mayor). He was Minister of interior in Vladan Đorđević's government. He was loyal to King Milan Obrenović and King Alexander, he was a staunch opponent of the marriage of King Aleksandar Obrenović to citizen Draga Mašin. Due to public condemnation of this marriage and political debates, Genčić was sentenced to seven years in prison, of which he served one.

He was a very important figure during the conspiracy related to the May Coup. After the formation of the new government under the Karađorđevićs, he was Minister of National Economy, but soon retired.

During the Balkan Wars and World War I, he was a correspondent for Russian newspapers in the Serbian army.

The Nikola Tesla Museum is located in his family home.
