= Dimitrije Cincar-Marković =

Serbian military leader and politician (1849–1903)

Dimitrije Cincar-Marković Димитрије Цинцар-Марковић
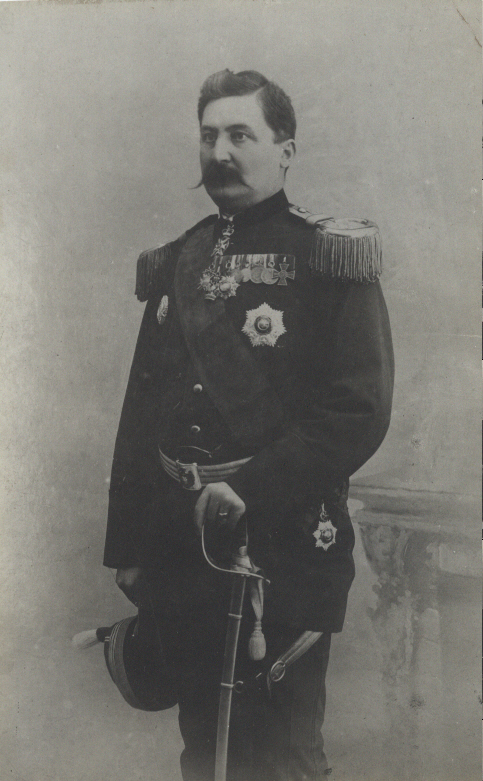

Prime Minister of Serbia
- In office 7 November 1902 – 29 May 1903
- Monarch: Alexander I of Serbia

Personal details
- Born: 25 August 1849 Šabac, Serbia
- Died: 29 May 1903 (aged 53) Belgrade, Serbia

Dimitrije Cincar-Marković (Serbian Cyrillic: Димитрије Цинцар-Марковић; 6 September 1849 – 11 June 1903) was a Serbian politician serving as the Prime Minister of the Kingdom of Serbia, army general, Chief of General Staff, professor of war history and strategy.

As one of the closest associates of king Milan from 1897 to 1900, he made a significant contribution to the great reform, enlargement, and promotion of the army of the Kingdom of Serbia, which enabled its success in the Balkan wars. General Dimitrije Cincar-Marković took steps to combat the revolutionaries of the Bulgarian Exarchate who were terrorizing the Serbian population in Old Serbia and Macedonia. He brought the assassins of Grigoriy Schterbina to justice. He was killed in the May Coup of 11 June 1903.

He was awarded Order of Miloš the Great, Order of the White Eagle, Order of the Cross of Takovo, Knight's Cross of the Order of Franz Joseph, Order of Osmanieh, Order of the Medjidie, Commander of the Legion of Honour, Order of the Iron Crown, Serbian Golden and Silver Medal for bravery and other decorations and medals.

== Selected works ==
- Uput za manevrovanje trupa, Belgrade, 1885.
- Uput za manevrovanje trupa, Belgrade, 1897.
- Vođenje trupa i služba po štabovima, Belgrade, 1886.
- Francuska stručna ocena nemačke konjice, Belgrade, 1882, pp. 323.

Government offices
Preceded by Petar Velimirović	Prime Minister of Serbia; 1902–1903	Succeeded by Jovan Avakumović
Preceded by Jovan Atanacković	Chief of the Serbian General Staff; 1901–1902	Succeeded by Svetozar T. Nešić
