= Order of Miloš the Great =

Order of Miloš the Great Орден Милоша Великог
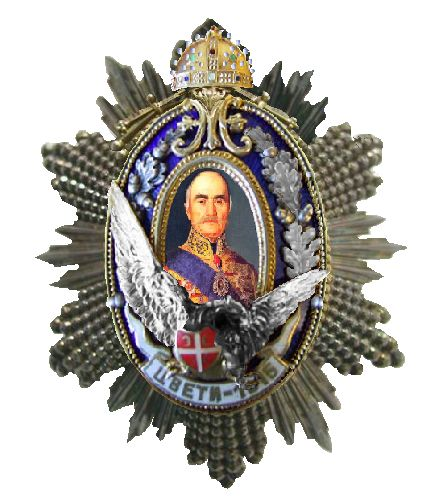
- Star of the order
- Type: Dynastic order
- Presented by: Kingdom of Serbia
- Status: Abolished in 1903
- Established: 11 December 1898
- Ribbon of the order

Precedence
- Next (higher): Order of St. Prince Lazar
- Next (lower): Order of the White Eagle
- Related: Order of Karađorđe's Star

The Order of Miloš the Great (Serbian: Орден Милоша Великог, romanized: Orden Miloša Velikog) was an Order of the Kingdom of Serbia. Founded in 1898 by King Alexander I of Serbia, the order was named in honor of Miloš Obrenović, the leader of the Second Serbian Uprising, and founder of the house of Obrenović. The order was suppressed in 1903 by King Peter I of Serbia, a member of the competing house of Karađorđević.
