= Lazar Petrović =

Serbian general (1855-1903)

Lazar Petrović Лазар Петровић
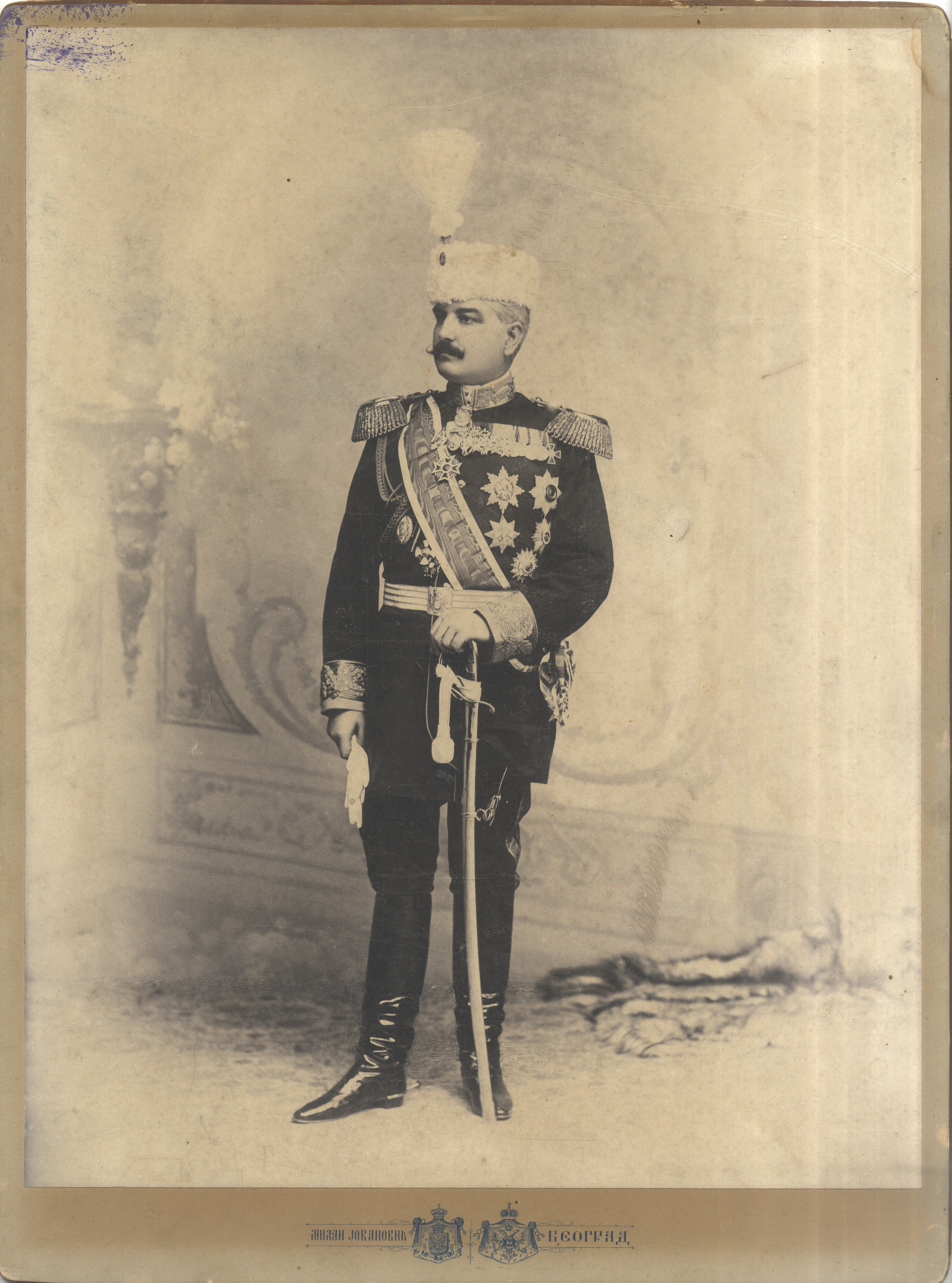
- Born: 10 March 1855; Bašino Selo near Veles, Ottoman Empire
- Died: 11 June 1903 (aged 48); Belgrade, Kingdom of Serbia
- Military career
- Allegiance: Principality of Serbia; Kingdom of Serbia
- Service years: 1875–1887; 1889–1903
- Rank: General
- Conflicts: Serbian-Ottoman War

Lazar Petrović (Serbian Cyrillic: Лазар Петровић; 10 March 1855 – 11 June 1903), also known as Lepi Laza ("Handsome Lazar"), was a Serbian general, adjutant of King Aleksandar I Obrenović and professor at Belgrade Military Academy. He was killed while attempting to defend the king in the 1903 May Coup.

== Early life ==
Petrović was born in Bašino Selo in Macedonia. Early in his life his family moved to Serbia where after five years at high school in Kragujevac and Belgrade he enrolled in 1871 at the Serbian Military Academy. Petrović graduated as part of the class of 1875, and was commissioned with the rank of second lieutenant.

== Military career ==
During the Serbian-Turkish Wars (1876-1878) Petrović served first as the orderly officer of West Morava division (1876), then as a commander of a company. After the war he became the adjutant of the 1st Infantry Regiment. In 1881 Petrović became aide to Prince Milan of Serbia becoming closely identified to the Obrenović dynasty. Most of his successes were to be attributed to his loyalty to the cause of King Milan and later his son, Aleksandar.

In 1885 Petrović became the commander of the 19th Infantry Battalion and as such served in the Serbo-Bulgarian War the same year. In 1887 he resigned from his post to become the head of Negotin County. He was reappointed to the army two years later and appointed to command the 7th Infantry Battalion. It was rumored that his temporary retirement into civilian life was only taken since Petrović could not pass the exam for promotion to major but that he received that rank when he returned to the army as a high state official. In 1892 he became the Head of the Infantry Non Commissioned Officers’ School.

Petrović closely supported the young king Aleksandar when on April 1, 1893, he overthrew the regency and took control of the kingdom.

In 1895 Petrović was promoted to the post of Commander of the Danube Infantry Regiment. However, in 1896 he was downgraded to the rank of commander of the 7th battalion again. From 1894 to 1896 he also taught tactics at Belgrade's Military Academy.

== Adjutant and death ==
In 1897-1898 he served as the adjutant of King Aleksandar Obrenović. After that he was sent as the Serbian military attaché to Constantinople. He returned to the position of King's Adjutant in 1901 and served as such until his death.

Petrović was on duty on the night when a military coup took place (see "May Overthrow"). A group of army officers formed a conspiracy and during the night of 10–11 June 1903 entered the royal palace in Belgrade with the intention of overthrowing the unpopular King Aleksandar and Queen Draga. After about two hours of confusion in the blacked-out building the royal couple were found in hiding and killed. Petrović and other officers loyal to Aleksandar either died in exchanges of fire with the attackers or were shot after surrender.

Petrović's nickname in Belgrade was Lepi Laza (“Handsome Laza”).

He was the recipient of high Serbian decorations of Serbia, as well as decorations from France, Austria-Hungary, Romania and Hawaii.
