= Dragutin Dimitrijević =

Serbian army officer and conspirator

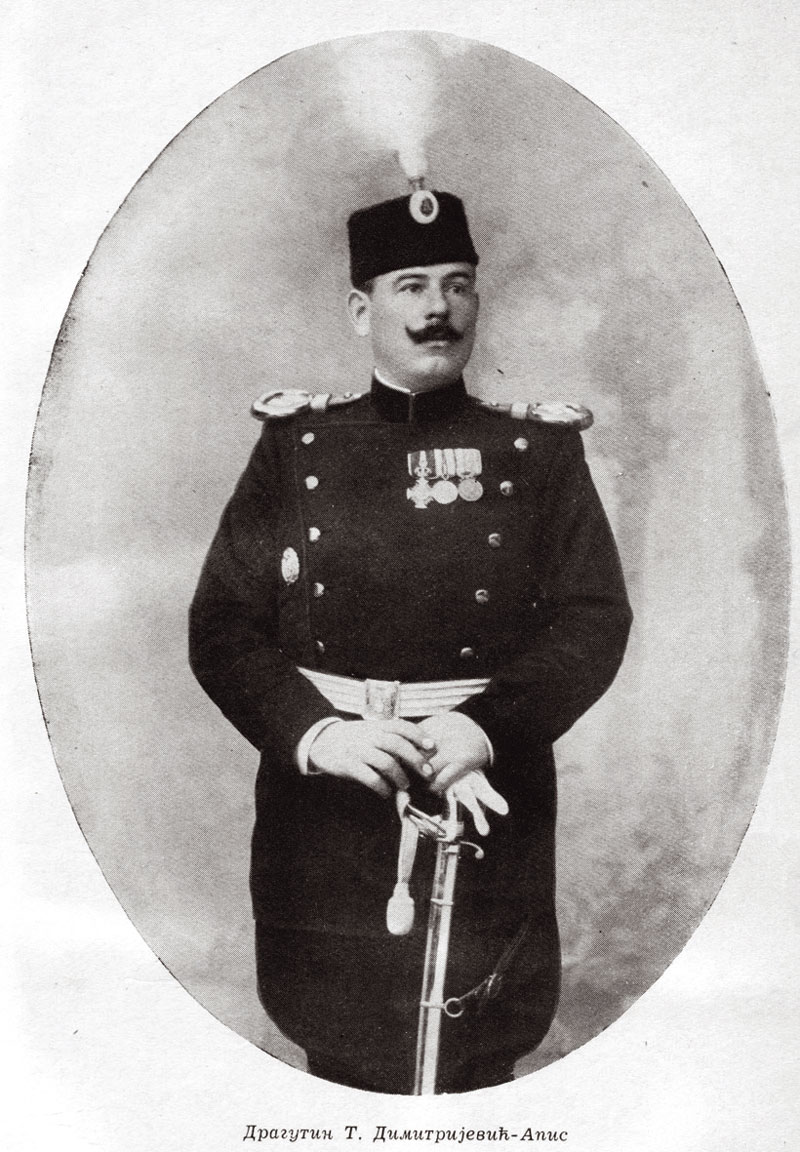
- Dimitrijević, c. 1900
- Born: 17 August 1876; Belgrade, Serbia
- Died: 26 June 1917 (aged 40); Thessaloniki, Greece
- Cause of death: Execution by firing squad
- Resting place: Zeitenlik
- Other name: Apis

Dragutin Dimitrijević (Serbian Cyrillic: Драгутин Димитријевић; 17 August 1876 – 26 June 1917), better known by his nickname Apis (Апис), was a Serbian army officer who was the main leader of the Black Hand, a paramilitary secret society devoted to South Slav irredentism that organized the 1903 overthrow of the Serbian government and assassination of King Alexander I of Serbia and Queen Draga. Many scholars believe that he also sanctioned and helped organize the assassination of Archduke Franz Ferdinand on 28 June 1914. This led directly to the July Crisis and the outbreak of World War I.

In 1916, the government in exile of Serbian prime minister Nikola Pašić, who considered Dimitrijević's refusal to compromise on South Slav irredentism to represent a serious threat to the secret peace negotiations taking place with Vienna during the Sixtus Affair, filed charges of high treason against the leadership of Unification or Death. Dimitrijević was tried in Thessaloniki before a Serbian Army court martial. He was found guilty of conspiring to assassinate both the Archduke and Prince Regent Alexander Karađorđević and executed by firing squad, along with two senior associates, on 26 June 1917.

== Early life ==
Dragutin Dimitrijević was born in Belgrade, Principality of Serbia, on 19 August 1876 to an Aromanian family. His father and two brothers were often away working as tinsmiths and he grew up with his two older sisters in Niš. At the age of nine, his father died. After Dimitrijević's oldest sister married, the family moved back to Belgrade where, at the age of 16, Dimitrijević attended the Lyceum of the Principality of Serbia followed the Belgrade Military Academy as a cadet in 1892. Dimitrijević finished the academy's lower school as sixth in his class in 1896. Two years later, he enrolled in the higher school. A brilliant student, upon graduation, he was assigned to the General staff of the Serbian Army, an indication that his superiors held him in high regard.

== May Coup ==
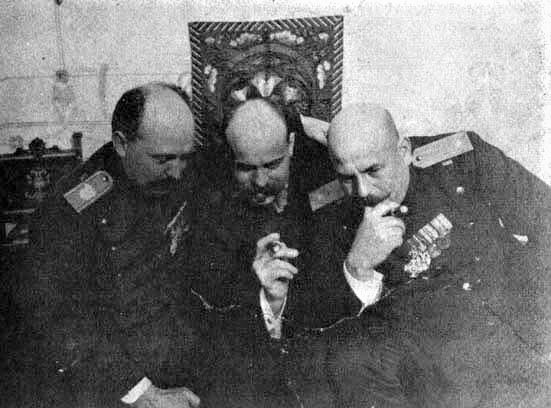
Dragutin Dimitrijević (right) and his associates

In 1901, Dimitrijević participated in the organisation of the first failed attempt to murder the unpopular and pro-détente with Austria-Hungary King Alexander. On 11 June 1903 the plotters succeeded when Dimitrijević and a group of junior officers stormed the royal palace and killed King Alexander, his wife, Queen Draga and three others. During the attack, Dimitrijević was shot three times, and the bullets were never removed from his body.

Following the regicide, the Serbian Parliament described Dimitrijević as "the saviour of the fatherland". In his memoirs, former Imperial Russian Foreign Office official Dmitri Abrikosov traced the inception of the Russo-Serbian military alliance that helped cause the First World War to the immediate aftermath of the 1903 palace coup and regicide. The new anti-Habsburg government of Serbia, as had been desired by Dimitrijević, dispatched a very clever diplomat to St Petersburg, where he successfully "wooed the Slavophiles" within the last Tsar's government.

After various commands and staff positions he taught tactics at the Belgrade Military Academy. Around 1906 Dimitrijević visited Russia and Germany, where he learned the language and studied the latest military programs. In 1911 he helped founding Ujedinjenje ili Smrt (Unification or Death), commonly known as the Black Hand, a conspiratorial network supporting the formation of a Greater Serbia state. Dimitrijević, who used the code name Apis, became the leader of the Black Hand.

Dimitrijević's main objective was the liberation and unification of all Serb populated regions under Ottoman or Austro-Hungarian rule, this became more urgent after the monarchy annexed Bosnia and Herzegovina in 1908 provoking the Bosnian Crisis. Austrian officials regarded the aspirations of Pan-Serbs as a significant threat to the Hapsburg Empire. During the Balkan Wars in 1912 and 1913, Dimitrijević took no part in the fighting. Dimitrijević had his men disguise as Albanians and commit political murders. In 1913 Dimitrijević was appointed chief of general staff intelligence in the Serbian army.

== Assassination of Archduke Franz Ferdinand ==
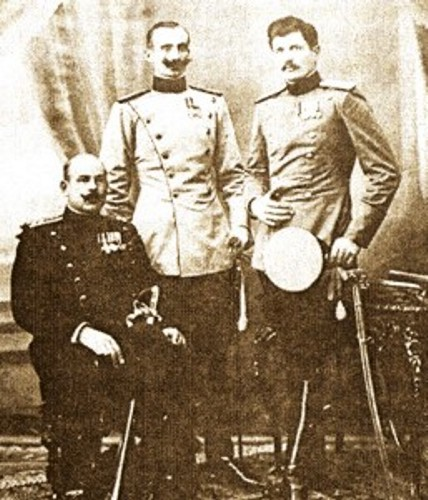
Dragutin Dimitrijević (left), Dušan Glišić and Antonije Antić

In 1911, Dimitrijević organized an attempt to assassinate the Austrian emperor Franz Joseph I. In early 1914, after finding out that three young Bosnian Serb students, led by nineteen-year-old Gavrilo Princip, were plotting to assassinate Franz Joseph's heir, Archduke Franz Ferdinand, during his upcoming visit to Sarajevo, the Black Hand provided the conspirators with weapons and training in Belgrade. The support came from railway employee Milan Ciganović, a member of the Black Hand, with the presumed approval of Dimitrijević.

According to historian Christopher Clark, it is possible that Ciganović informed Serbian prime minister Nikola Pašić about the plot, but this speculation rests on indirect evidence. It is believed, however, that after being warned of the presence of Bosnian assassins in Serbia, Pašić gave instructions for the arrest of young Bosnians who attempted to cross back into Bosnia. However, his orders were not implemented, and the three men arrived in what was then known as the Condominium of Bosnia and Herzegovina, where they joined forces with fellow conspirators recruited by Princip's former roommate Danilo Ilić, Veljko and Vaso Čubrilović, Muhamed Mehmedbašić, Cvjetko Popović and Miško Jovanović. On 28 June 1914 Princip mortally wounded Franz Ferdinand and his wife Sophie, Duchess of Hohenberg.

Surviving conspirator Vaso Čubrilović stated that the pistols and bombs used in the assassination were supplied to fellow Black Hand member Gavrilo Princip by Dimitrijević in Belgrade and then smuggled across the border, along with cyanide capsules for the conspirators to use to commit suicide in the event of capture. The failure of these cyanide capsules to work properly allowed the conspirators, who had received absolutely no training in how to withstand interrogation, to be easily tricked by Austrian police detectives and investigative magistrates into confessing and revealing the Colonel's involvement.

On 23 July 1914, the Austro-Hungarian government sent its July Ultimatum to the Serbian government with a list of ten demands. In his response on 25 July 1914, Pašić accepted all the points of the ultimatum except the sixth, which demanded that Serbia allow an Austrian delegation to participate in a criminal investigation against those participants in the conspiracy that were in Serbia. Three days later, Austria-Hungary declared war on Serbia. In 1916, Dimitrijević was promoted to colonel shortly before his arrest on the charge of high treason.

== Execution ==
While engaged in secret peace negotiations with Emperor Charles I of Austria-Hungary during the Sixtus Affair that hinged upon showing that he was committed to preventing post-war outbreaks of state terrorism in the name of Yugoslavism or creating a Greater Serbia, Pašić decided that Col. Apis represented far too serious of a threat to Serbia's chances of regaining its independence.

The Prince Regent and the Prime Minister both set out to get rid of him and the most prominent leaders, even though the Black Hand had officially disbanded. Dimitrijević and several of his military colleagues were arrested in December 1916 and court-martialed for both the murder of the Archduke and the attempted assassination of Prince Regent Alexander I of Yugoslavia in September 1916. On 23 May 1917, during the Salonika Trial, Dimitrijević and three of his fellow defendants, Ljuba Vulović, Rade Malobabić, and Muhamed Mehmedbašić, confessed their roles in the assassination of the Archduke. Col. Dimitrijević was accordingly found guilty of high treason and sentenced to death.

In justifying the use of the death penalty, Prime Minister Pašić wrote to his envoy in London: "...Dimitrijević (Apis) besides everything else admitted he had ordered Franz Ferdinand to be killed. And now who could reprieve them?" A month later, on 26 June 1917, Dimitrijević was executed by Royal Serbian Army firing squad. His last words were, "Long live Yugoslavia!" In 1953, Dimitrijević and his codefendants were all posthumously retried by the Supreme Court of Serbia and found not guilty because there was no proof of their alleged participation in an assassination plot against the Prince Regent.

All three men are buried at the Serbian Military Graveyard in the Zeitenlik Allied military cemetery.
