= Alexander I of Serbia =

King of Serbia from 1889 to 1903

Alexander I Александар I Обреновић
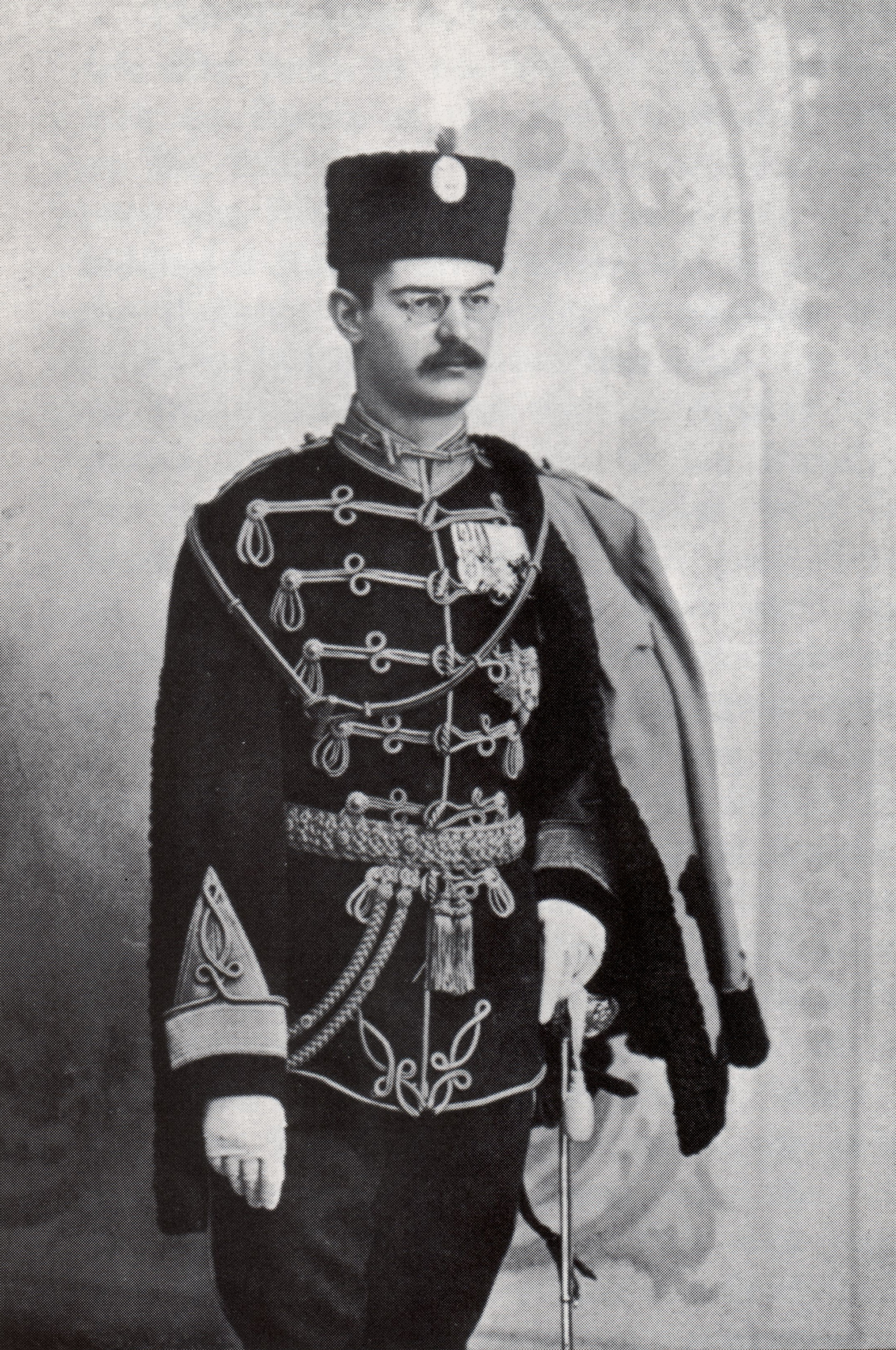
- Alexander in 1900

King of Serbia
- Reign: 6 March 1889 – 11 June 1903
- Coronation: 2 July 1889
- Predecessor: Milan I
- Successor: Peter I
- Born: 14 August 1876; Belgrade, Serbia
- Died: 11 June 1903 (aged 26); Belgrade, Serbia
- Burial: St. Mark's Church, Belgrade
- Spouse: Draga Mašin (m. 1900)
- House: Obrenović
- Father: Milan I of Serbia
- Mother: Natalija Keşco
- Religion: Serbian Orthodox

Styles of Alexander I of Serbia
- Reference style: His Majesty
- Spoken style: Your Majesty

Alexander I (Serbian Cyrillic: Александар Обреновић, romanized: Aleksandar Obrenović; 14 August 1876 – 11 June 1903) reigned as the king of Serbia from 1889 to 1903 when he and his wife, Draga Mašin, were assassinated by a group of Royal Serbian Army officers, led by Captain Dragutin Dimitrijević.

== Accession ==
Alexander was born on 14 August 1876 to King Milan and Queen Natalie of Serbia. He belonged to the Obrenović dynasty.

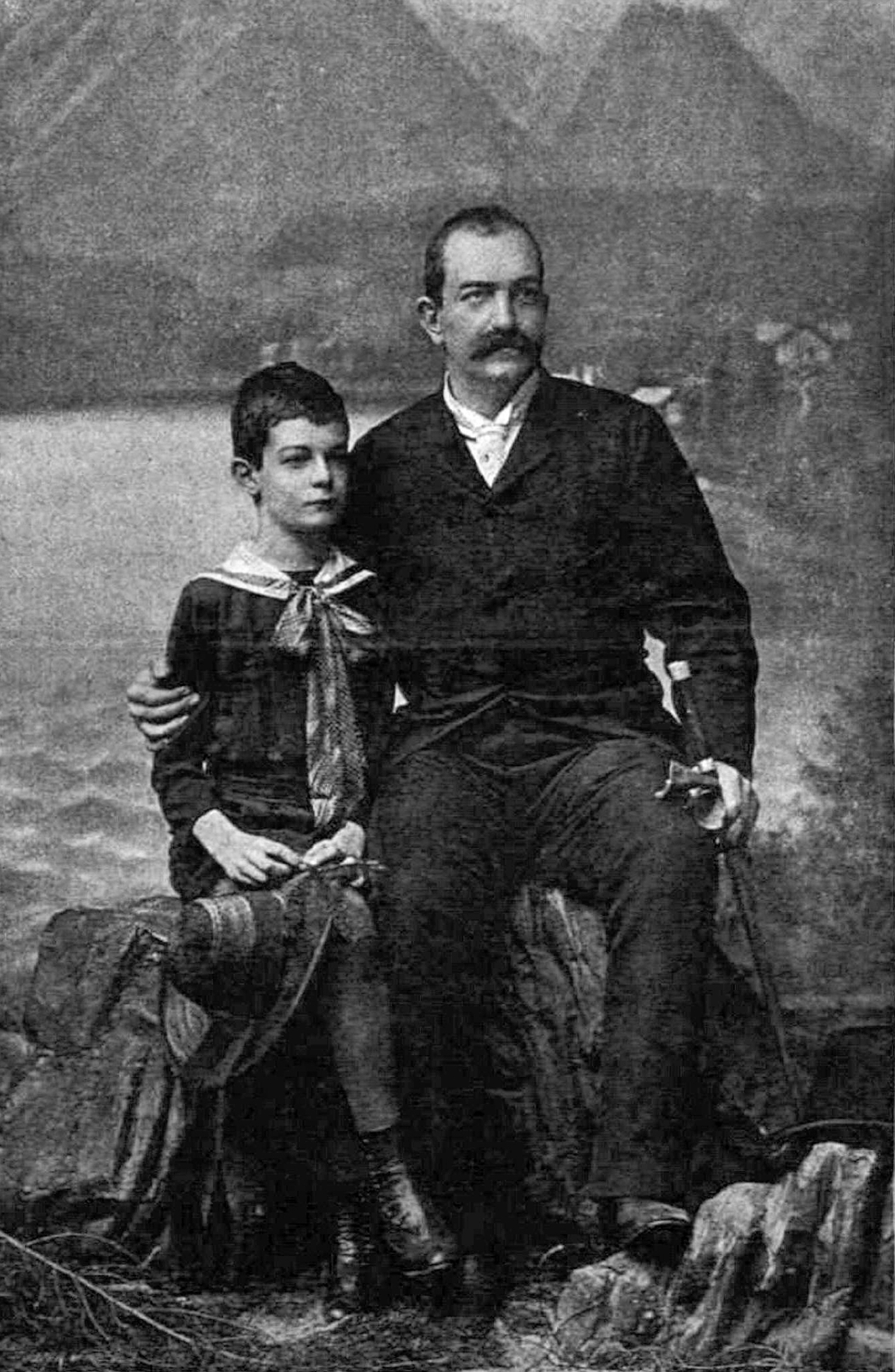
Young Alexander with his father King Milan in 1888 less than a year before Milan abdicated the throne in favour of his underage son

In 1889, King Milan unexpectedly abdicated and withdrew to private life, proclaiming Alexander king of Serbia. Since the king was only thirteen, three regents were appointed, head among them Jovan Ristich. His mother also became his regent.

Alexander ordered the arrest of the regents on April 13, 1893, proclaiming himself of age and dissolving national assembly. On May 21, he abolished his father's liberal constitution of 1889 and restored the previous one. In 1894, the young King brought his father, Milan, back to Serbia and, in 1898, appointed him commander-in-chief of the army. During that time, Milan was regarded as the de facto ruler of the country. In 1898 penalties were brought down upon the Radical and the Russophil parties, which the court sought to tie to an attempted assassination of the former King Milan.

Alexander's attitude during the Greco-Turkish War (1897) was one of strict neutrality.

== Marriage ==
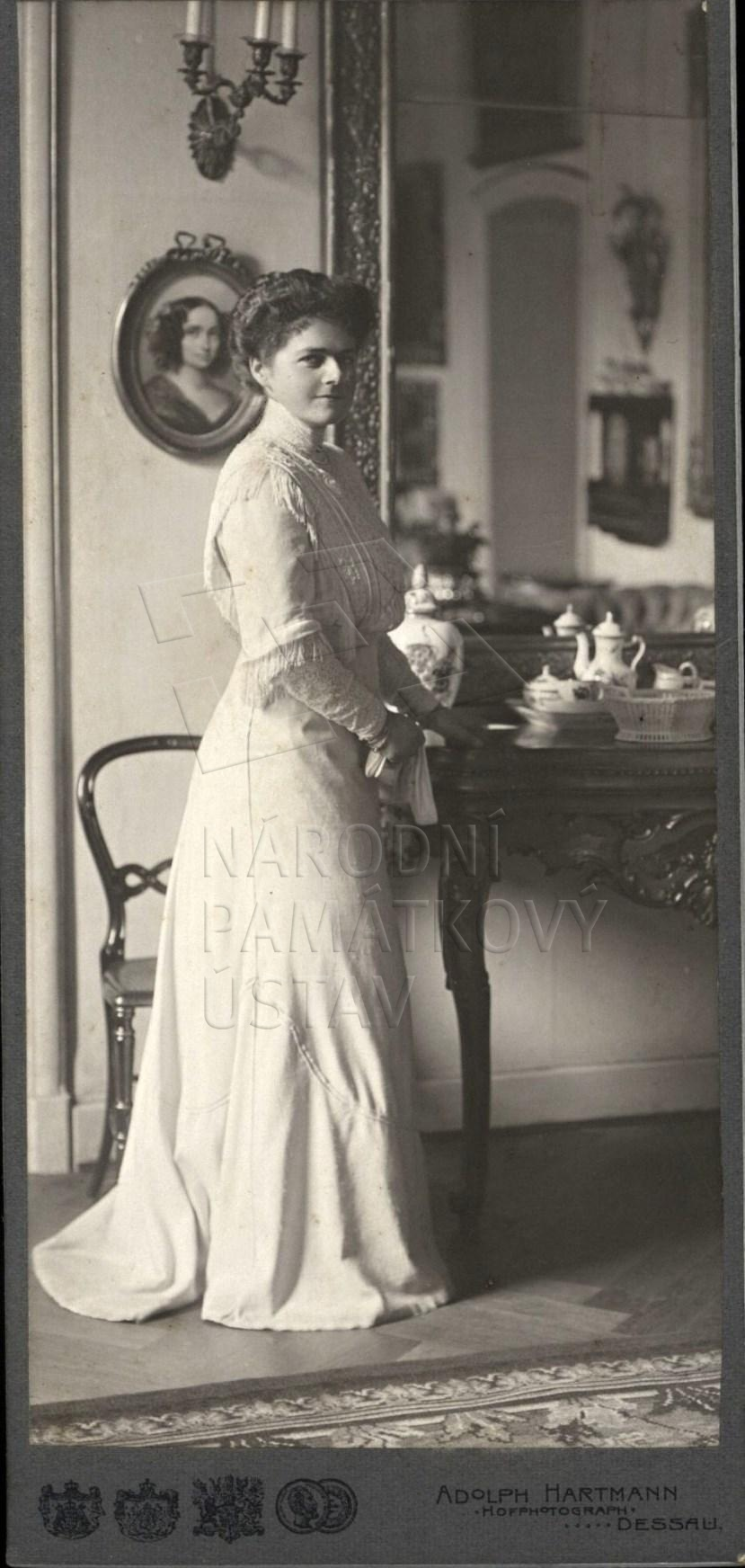
Princess Alexandra Karoline of Schaumburg-Lippe, intended bride for Alexander

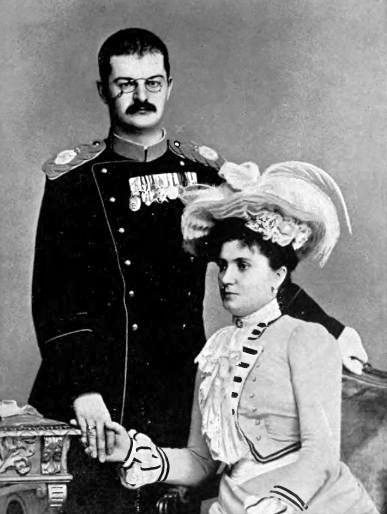
King Alexander and Queen Draga

Portrait of King Alexander by Vlaho Bukovac, 1900

In the summer of 1900, King Alexander suddenly announced his engagement to Draga Mašin, a disreputable widow of an obscure engineer. Alexander had met Draga in 1897 when she was serving as a maid of honor to his mother. Draga was nine years older than the king, unpopular with Belgrade society, well known for her allegedly numerous sexual liaisons, and widely believed to be infertile. Since Alexander was an only child, it was imperative to secure the succession by producing an heir. So intense was the opposition to Mašin among the political classes that the king found it impossible for a time to recruit suitable candidates for senior posts.

Before making the announcement of his intended engagement, Alexander did not consult with his father, who had been on vacation in Karlsbad and making arrangements to secure the hand of the suitable German royal, Princess Alexandra Karoline of Schaumburg-Lippe, member of an old House of Lippe, sister of the Queen of Württemberg, for his son, or his Prime Minister Dr. Vladan Đorđević, who was visiting the Universal Exhibition in Paris at the time of the announcement. Both immediately resigned, and Alexander had difficulty in forming a new cabinet. Alexander's mother also opposed the marriage and was subsequently banished from the kingdom.

Opposition to the union seemed to subside somewhat for a time upon the publication of congratulations of Nicholas II of Russia to the king on his engagement and of his agreement to act as the principal witness at the wedding. The marriage duly took place in August 1900. Even so, the unpopularity of the union weakened the king's position in the eyes of the army and the country at large.

== Politics and the constitution ==
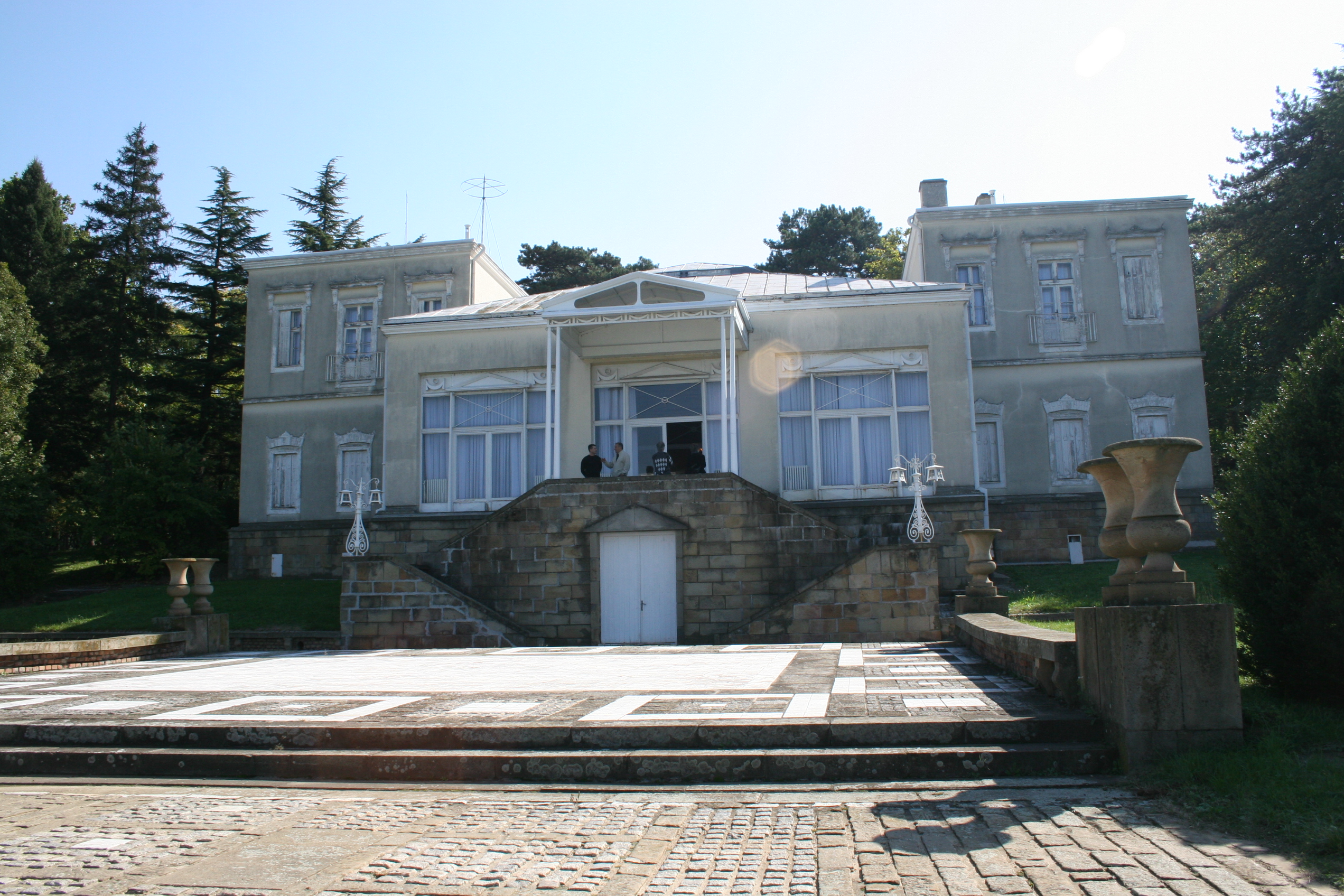
The Obrenović Villa, summer residence of King Alexander in Smederevo

King Alexander tried to reconcile political parties by unveiling a liberal constitution of his own initiative in 1901, introducing for the first time in the constitutional history of Serbia the system of two chambers (skupština and senate). This reconciled the political parties, but did not placate the army which, already dissatisfied with the king's marriage, became still more so at the rumours that one of the two unpopular brothers of Queen Draga, Lieutenant Nikodije, was to be proclaimed heir presumptive to the throne.

Alexander's good relations and the country's growing dependence on Austria-Hungary were detested by the Serbian public. Two million Serbs lived in Austria-Hungary, with another million in the Ottoman Empire, although many migrated to Serbia.

Meanwhile, the independence of the senate and of the council of state caused increasing irritation to King Alexander. In March 1903, the king suspended the constitution for half an hour, time enough to publish decrees dismissing and replacing the old senators and councillors of state. This arbitrary act increased dissatisfaction in the country.

Attempting to appease the opposition, King Alexander granted an amnesty to the persecuted Radicals, and in 1901 issued a moderately liberal constitution. A Council of State and a second chamber to parliament were instituted.

In 1902 Alexander's rival Peter Кarađorđević was proclaimed king by followers at Šabac, and Alexander responded by organizing a military cabinet and suspending the constitution. Radicals began to plot the King's assassination.

== Assassination ==
The general impression was that, as much as the senate was packed with men devoted to the royal couple and the government obtained a large majority at the general elections, King Alexander would not hesitate any longer to proclaim Queen Draga's brother as the heir presumptive to the throne. In spite of this, it had been agreed with the Serbian government that Prince Mirko of Montenegro, who was married to Natalija Konstantinović, the granddaughter of Princess Anka Obrenović, an aunt of King Milan, would be proclaimed heir presumptive in the event that the marriage of King Alexander and Queen Draga was childless.

Apparently to prevent Queen Draga's brother being named heir presumptive, but in reality, to replace Alexander Obrenović with Peter Karađorđević, a conspiracy was organized by a group of army officers headed by Captain Dragutin Dimitrijević, also known as "Apis", and Novak Perišić, a young Serbian Orthodox militant who was in the pay of the Russian Empire, as well as the leader of the Black Hand secret society which would assassinate Archduke Franz Ferdinand in 1914. Several politicians were also members of the conspiracy and allegedly included former Prime Minister Nikola Pašić. The royal couple's palace was invaded and they hid in a wardrobe in the queen's bedroom. (There is another possibility, used in a Serbian TV history series The End of the Obrenović Dynasty in which the royal couple was in a secret safe room hidden behind the mirror in a common bedroom. The room contained an entrance to a secret passage leading out of the palace, but the entrance was inaccessible due to the placement of the queen's wardrobe over it after the wedding.)

The conspirators searched the palace and eventually discovered the royal couple and murdered them in the early morning of 11 June 1903. They were shot and their bodies mutilated and disembowelled, after which, according to eyewitness accounts, they were thrown from a second-floor window of the palace onto piles of garden manure. King Alexander and Queen Draga were buried in the crypt of St. Mark's Church, Belgrade.

== Honours ==
- Kingdom of Serbia:
  - Founder of the Order of St. Prince Lazar, 28 June 1889
  - Founder of the Order of Miloš the Great, 1898
- Austria-Hungary: Grand Cross of the Order of St. Stephen, 1891
- Baden:
  - Knight of the House Order of Fidelity, 1894
  - Knight of the Order of Berthold the First, 1894
- Kingdom of Italy: Knight of the Order of the Annunciation, 25 November 1896
- Kingdom of Portugal: Grand Cross of the Sash of the Three Orders, 5 August 1893
- Russian Empire: Knight of the Order of St. Andrew
- Spain: Grand Cross of the Order of Charles III, with Collar, 24 September 1897

== Notes ==
Alexander I of Serbia House of Obrenović Born: 24 August 1876 Died: 11 June 1903
Regnal titles
Preceded by Milan I	King of Serbia; 6 March 1889 – 11 June 1903	Succeeded by Peter I
