= List of Serbian royal consorts =

This is a list of consorts of Serbian monarchs from the early 11th century until the kingdom was abolished in 1945.

== Middle Ages ==
=== Princesses and Queens consort of Duklja (10th–12th century) ===
Picture	Name	Father	Birth	Marriage	Became Princess	Ceased to be Princess	Death	Spouse
	Theodora Kosara	Samuel of Bulgaria (Cometopuli)		c. 1000		1016 husband's death		Jovan Vladimir
	Neda	niece of Samuel of Bulgaria (Cometopuli)				1043 husband's death	1046	Stefan Vojislav
	Monomachina	niece of Constantine IX Monomachos (Monomachos)				1081 (husband's death)		Mihailo I Vojislavljević
	Jaquinta of Bari	Argyritzos				1101 (husband's death)	1118	Konstantin Bodin Vojislavljević
	Desislava	Undetermined				1186 (husband's death)	after 1189	Mihailo III Vojislavljević

=== Grand Princesses consort of Serbia (1091–1217) ===
Picture	Name	Father	Birth	Marriage	Became Princess	Ceased to be Princess	Death	Spouse
	Anna Diogenissa	Constantine Diogenes II (Diogenes)	before 1075		c. 1112	1145 (husband's abdication)		Uroš I Vukanović
	Anastasija	Undetermined				1196 (husband's abdication)	1200	Stefan Nemanja
	Eudokia Angelina	Alexios III Angelos (Angelos)	1173	c. 1190	1196	after 1198 or 1201–02 (divorce)	c. 1211	Stefan Nemanjić

=== Queens consort of Serbia and Syrmia ===
==== Nemanjić dynasty (1217–1346) ====
Image	Name	Ancestry	Lifespan	Marriage	Term	Spouse
	Anna Dandolo	Raniero Dandolo (Dandolo)	?–1258	1217	1217–1228	Stefan Nemanjić
	Anna Angelina Komnene Doukaina	Theodore Komnenos Doukas (Angelos)		1219/1220	1228–1234	Stefan Radoslav
	Beloslava of Bulgaria	Ivan Asen II (Asen dynasty)			1234–1243	Stefan Vladislav
	Saint Helen of Serbia	Undetermined	1235–8 February 1314	1245–1250	1245–1276	Stefan Uroš I
	Catherine of Hungary	Stephen V of Hungary (Árpád)	1256–after 1314	c. 1268	1276–1314	Stefan Dragutin
	Helena Doukaina Angelina	John Doukas, Sebastokratōr (Angelos)		1273–1276	1282–1283	Stefan Milutin
	Elizabeth of Hungary	Stephen V of Hungary (Árpád)	c. 1255–c. 1322	1283	1283–1284	Stefan Milutin
	Ana Terter	George I of Bulgaria (Terter)	?–after 1304	1284	1284–1299	Stefan Milutin
	Simonis Palaiologina	Andronikos II Palaiologos (Palaiologos)	c. 1294–after 1345	1299	1299–1321	Stefan Milutin
	Constanza Morosini	granddaughter of Albertino Morosini (Morosini)	1275–1324		1316–1324	Stefan Vladislav II
	Teodora of Bulgaria	Smilets of Bulgaria (Smilets)	?–1322	1296	1321–1322	Stefan Dečanski
	Maria Palaiologina	John Palaiologos (Palaiologos)	?–1355	1324	1324 – 8 September 1331	Stefan Dečanski
	Helena of Bulgaria	Sratsimir (Sratsimir)	c. 1315–1374	1332	1332–1346	Stefan Dušan

=== Empresses consort of the Serbian Empire ===
==== Nemanjić dynasty (1346–73) ====
Picture	Name	Father	Birth	Marriage	Became Consort	Ceased to be Consort	Death	Spouse
	Helena of Bulgaria	Sratsimir (Sratsimir)	c. 1315	1332	1346 became Empress	1355 husband's death	1374	Stefan Dušan
	Anna of Wallachia	Nicholas Alexander of Wallachia (Basarab)		1360		1371 husband's death		Stefan Uroš V
	Thomais Orsini	John II Orsini (Orsini)	c. 1330		1359	1370 husband's death		Simeon Uroš
	Unnamed daughter of Radoslav Hlapen	Radoslav Hlapen (Hlapenović)			1370	1373 husband's abdication		John Uroš

=== Magnate era ===
==== Hlapenović and Bagaš noble family of the Lordship of Voden (1371–85) ====
Picture	Name	Father	Birth	Marriage	Became Consort	Ceased to be Consort	Death	Spouse
	Irina	Stefan Dušan (Nemanjić dynasty)		1356	1371	1375; Byzantine conquest		Radoslav Hlapen
	Unnamed daughter of Radoslav Hlapen	Radoslav Hlapen (Hlapenović)		1366–7	1375	1385; Ottoman conquest		Nikola Bagaš

==== Mrnjavčević family of the Lordship of Prilep (1371–95) ====
Picture	Name	Father	Birth	Marriage	Became Consort	Ceased to be Consort	Death	Spouse
	Jelena	Radoslav Hlapen (Hlapenović)			1371	1395 husband's death		Marko Mrnjavčević

==== Lazarević dynasty of Moravian Serbia (1371–1402) ====
Picture	Name	Father	Birth	Marriage	Became Consort	Ceased to be Consort	Death	Spouse
	Princess Milica of Serbia	Vratko Nemanjić (Nemanjić)	1335		1371 husband's accession	1389 husband's death	1405	Lazar of Serbia

==== Dejanović noble family of the Principality of Velbazhd (1371–95) ====
Picture	Name	Father	Birth	Marriage	Became Consort	Ceased to be Consort	Death	Spouse
	Eudokia of Trebizond	Alexios III of Trebizond (Komnenos)		1387		1395 husband's death	after 1395	Konstantin Dejanović

==== Žarković family of the Principality of Valona (1396–1417) ====
Picture	Name	Father	Birth	Marriage	Became Consort	Ceased to be Consort	Death	Spouse
	Ruđina Balšić	Balša II (Balšić)		1391	1396	1414 husband's death	1420	Mrkša Žarković

==== Preljubović family of the Despotate of Epirus (1366–85) ====
Picture	Name	Father	Birth	Marriage	Became Consort	Ceased to be Consort	Death	Spouse
	Maria Angelina Doukaina Palaiologina	Simeon Uroš (Nemanjić)	1349	1361	1366	1384 husband's death	1394	Thomas Preljubović

==== Branković dynasty of the District of Branković (1371–1412) ====
Picture	Name	Father	Birth	Marriage	Became Consort	Ceased to be Consort	Death	Spouse
	Mara Lazarević	Lazar of Serbia (Lazarević)			1371	1396 husband's imprisonment	1426	Vuk Branković
	Elena of Trebizond	Alexios IV of Trebizond (Komnenos)	c. 1395			1410		Đurađ Branković

==== Balšić noble family of Zeta (1371–1421) ====
Picture	Name	Father	Birth	Marriage	Became Consort	Ceased to be Consort	Death	Spouse
	Teodora Dejanović	Despot Dejan (Dejanović)		after 1371		1378 husband's death		Đurađ I Balšić
	Comita Muzaka	Andrea II Muzaka (Muzaka)		1372	1378	1385 husband's death	1396	Balša II
	Jelena Lazarević	Lazar of Serbia (Lazarević)	1365/66	1386/87		1403 husband's death	1443	Đurađ II Balšić
	Mara Thopia	Niketa Thopia (Thopia)		1407		1412 divorce		Balša III
	Boglia Zaharia	Koja Zaharia (Zaharia)		1412/13		1421 husband's death		Balša III

==== Crnojević noble family of Zeta (1451–96) ====
Picture	Name	Father	Birth	Marriage	Became Consort	Ceased to be Consort	Death	Spouse
	Mara Kastrioti	Gjon Kastrioti (Kastrioti)			1451	1465 husband's death		Stefan Crnojević
	Voisava Arianiti	Gjergj Arianiti (Arianiti)	c. 1429	c. 1460	1465	before July 1469		Ivan Crnojević
	Mara Kosača	Stjepan Vukčić Kosača (Kosača)		1469		1490 husband's death		Ivan Crnojević
	Elisabetta Erizzo	Antonio Erizzo (Erizzo)		1490		1496; Ottoman conquest	1522	Đurađ Crnojević

=== Despotess consort of the Serbian Despotate ===
==== Lazarević dynasty (1402–27) ====
Picture	Name	Father	Birth	Marriage	Became Consort	Ceased to be Consort	Death	Spouse
	Helena Gattilusio	Francesco II Gattilusio (Gattilusio)	-	1405		19 July 1427 husband's death	-	Stefan Lazarević

==== Branković dynasty (1427–59) ====
Picture	Name	Father	Birth	Marriage	Became Consort	Ceased to be Consort	Death	Spouse
	Irene Kantakouzene	Theodore Kantakouzenos (Kantakouzenos)	1400	26 December 1414	1427 husband's accession	24 December 1456 husband's death	2 May/3 May 1457	Đurađ Branković
	Helena Palaiologina, Despotess of Serbia	Thomas Palaiologos (Palaiologos)	1430	1446	24 December 1456 husband's accession	20 January 1458 husband's death	7 November 1473	Lazar Branković

==== Kotromanić dynasty (1459) ====
Picture	Name	Father	Birth	Marriage	Became Consort	Ceased to be Consort	Death	Spouse
	Helena-Maria of Serbia	Lazar Branković (Branković)	1447	1 April 1459		20 June 1459; Ottoman conquest	1498	Stephen Tomašević of Bosnia

=== Despotesses consort (in exile) ===
==== Branković dynasty (1471–1502) ====
Picture	Name	Father	Birth	Marriage	Became Consort	Ceased to be Consort	Death	Spouse
	Barbara Frankopan	Sigismund Frankopan (Frankopan)	-	1482		16 April 1485 husband's death	1508	Vuk Grgurević Branković
	Isabella del Balzo	Agilberto del Balzo, Duke of Nardò (del Balzo)	-	1486		1497 husband's retirement	-	Đorđe Branković
	Jelena Jakšić	Stefan Jakšić (Jakšić)	-	-		10 December 1502 husband's death	after 1536	Jovan Branković

==== Berislavić family (1504–35) ====
Picture	Name	Father	Birth	Marriage	Became Consort	Ceased to be Consort	Death	Spouse
	Jelena Jakšić	Stefan Jakšić (Jakšić)	-	May 1504		1514 husband's death	after 1536	Ivaniš Berislavić
	Catherine Batthyány	Boldizsár Batthyány, Ban of Jajce (Batthyány)	-	-		1535 husband's death	after 1542	Stjepan Berislavić

==== Bakić family (1537) ====
Picture	Name	Father	Birth	Marriage	Became Consort	Ceased to be Consort	Death	Spouse
	Teodora	a nobleman from medieval Bosnia			1537 husband's accession	1537 husband's death	after 1540	Pavle Bakić

== Modern ==
=== Consort of the Grand Leader of the Revolutionary Serbia ===
==== Karađorđević dynasty (1804–13) ====
Picture	Name	Father	Birth	Marriage	Became Consort	Ceased to be Consort	Death	Spouse
	Jelena Jovanović	Nikola Jovanović, Obor-knez of Jasenica (Jovanović)	1765 or 1771	1785	15 February 1804	21 September 1813	9 February 1842	Karađorđe Petrović

=== Princesses consort of the Principality of Serbia ===
==== Obrenović dynasty (1815–42) ====
Picture	Name	Father	Birth	Marriage	Became Consort	Ceased to be Consort	Death	Spouse
	Ljubica Vukomanović	Radosav Vukomanović (Vukomanović)	September 1788	1805	6 November 1817 husband's election	25 June 1839 husband's abdication	26 May 1843	Miloš Obrenović I

==== Karađorđević dynasty (1842–58) ====
Picture	Name	Father	Birth	Marriage	Became Consort	Ceased to be Consort	Death	Spouse
	Persida Nenadović	Voivode Jevrem Nenadović (Nenadović)	15 February 1813	1 June 1830	14 September 1842 husband's election	24 October 1858 husband's abdication	29 March 1873	Alexander Karađorđević

==== Obrenović dynasty (1858–82) ====
Picture	Name	Father	Birth	Marriage	Became Consort	Ceased to be Consort	Death	Spouse
	Júlia Hunyady de Kéthely	Count Ferenc Hunyady de Kéthely (Hunyady de Kéthely)	26 August 1831	1 August 1853	26 September 1860 husband's accession	10 June 1868 husband's assassination	19 February 1919	Michael Obrenović III
	Natalia Keshko	Peter Keshko (Keshko)	15 May 1859	17 October 1875		6 March 1882 became queen of Serbia	8 May 1941	Milan Obrenović IV

== Queens consort of the Kingdom of Serbia ==
=== Obrenović dynasty (1882–1903) ===
Picture	Name	Father	Birth	Marriage	Became Consort	Ceased to be Consort	Death	Spouse
	Natalia Keshko	Peter Keshko (Keshko)	15 May 1859	17 October 1875	6 March 1882 became queen of Serbia	24 October 1888 controversial divorce	8 May 1941	Milan I
	Draga Mašin	Pantelija Lunjevica Milićević (Lunjevica)	23 September 1861	5 August 1900		11 June 1903		Alexander I

== Queens consort of Yugoslavia ==
=== Karađorđević dynasty (1918–45) ===
Picture	Name	Father	Birth	Marriage	Became Consort	Ceased to be Consort	Death	Spouse
	Maria of Romania	Ferdinand I of Romania (Hohenzollern-Sigmaringen)	6 January 1900	8 June 1922		9 October 1934 husband's death	22 June 1961	Alexander I
	Alexandra of Greece and Denmark	Alexander of Greece (Glücksburg)	25 March 1921	20 March 1944		29 November 1945 kingdom abolished	30 January 1993	Peter II

== See also ==
- List of princesses of Serbia

== Sources ==
- Ivić, Aleksa (1928). Родословне таблице српских династија и властеле. Novi Sad: Matica Srpska.
- Laskaris, Mihailo (1926). Vizantiske princeze u srednjevekovnoj Srbiji [Byzantine princesses in medieval Serbia]. Belgrade: Knj. Franja Baha.
- Nikolić, Dejan (1996). Svi vladari Srbije. Resavska škola.
- Purković, Miodrag (1996). Принцезе из куће Немањића. Belgrade.
- Veselinović, Andrija; Ljušić, Radoš (2002). Rodoslovi srpskih dinastija. Platoneum. ISBN 9788683639021.
