= 1891 Belgrade riot =

Riots in 1891 in Belgrade, Kingdom of Serbia

- The expulsion of Queen Mother Natalie from Belgrade (by the sketch of a Belgrade-based artist V. Tittelbach, Illustrirte Zeitung, 1891)
- Date: 18 May 1891
- Location: city centre of Belgrade, Kingdom of Serbia
- Caused by: Royal marriage and political crisis
- Goals: blocking the expulsion of Natalie of Serbia from the country
- Result: Police and military suppression

Parties
Natalie of Serbia loyalists	Government of Serbia Police: Serbian Royal Gendarmerie; Armed forces: Royal Serbian Army; Royal Guard Cavalry

Casualties
- Death: at least 2
- Injuries: several

The 1891 Belgrade riot, was a riot following the forced expulsion of Natalie, Queen mother of the Kingdom of Serbia, from Belgrade on 18 May 1891 as a escalation of long-term marriage and political crisis between Natalie and her former husband, Milan, King of Serbia. The event is marked as the first known case of the Serbian law enforcement shooting to their own citizens since the modern-era country's history.

== Prelude ==
In the mid 1880s, after thirteen years of marriage, Serbian royal couple struggeled in their relationship, following not just many affairs of the King with other women, but even political differences between King and Queen. While Milan pursued a pro-Austro-Hungarian foreign policy, Russian-born and slavophile Queen kept her political orientation focused on the Russian Empire, widely supported by Serbian public. The relationship reached a critical level in 1887, when Natalie left the country with their son and heir Alexander, staying temporatily abroad for the two following years.

On 6 March 1889, as consequence of the surprising abdication of her (former) husband, Natalie's thirteen-year old Alexander I became the king of Serbia. Until 1893, when Alexander assumed government himself, he was put under a regency council led by former Prime Minister Jovan Ristic. Tensions between the parens continued: while Milan secured the educational rights for his son for himself and attempted to unable the contact between Alexander and his mother, Natalie overcame this pressure and visited king Alexander on regular basis. In July 1890, the Synod of the Serbian Orthodox church declared the divorce between Milan and Natalie to be legal.

In April 1891, ex-king Milan, after several interferences in government affairs, announced his intention to leave Serbia until his son should be old enough to take over the rule. The parliament instructed the government to ask Queen Mother Natalie to act accordingly, but the Queen refused that. On 15 May she was visited by the Serbian Prime Minister Pašić and Interior Minister Đaja, where she defended her constitutional right to stay. Both officials then ordered Queen's forced deportation by police escort in a next few days.

== Riots ==
Telegram from Belgrade - 20 May: She is stil here. (Austrian satirical magazine Kikeriki, 17 May 1891)

At Wednesday of 18 May 1891 at 3 p.m., preparations were initiated for the Queen mother's escortatiton. The streets leading to her residence at Stari dvor are blocked off by the gendarmerie, same as the access road to the city railway station. A horse-drawn carriage with gendarmerie escort reached Natalie's residence and present police prefect, tried to persuade her to leave voluntarily once again. Meanwhile, crowds of Queen mother's supporters were gathering on the railway station street.

About 4:30 p.m, Natalie accompanied by two ladies of her staff left the palace in her own carriage under heavy gendarmerie escort to be taken to the Danube port, where she was about to board the steamship Deligrad taking her out of the country. Even as she was leaving the palace, several individuals confronted the carriage, preventing it from proceeding. The escort cleared the way; but the number of Queen mother's loyalists caused this scene to be repeated. When the collumn reached the square in front of the Saint Archangel Michael's Cathedral, a group of demonstrators, including students, threw themselves in front of the procession, threatening the escort and block the way in that direction. Meanwhile, new crowds gathered at the port pier with the same intention.

The students rescuing the Queen from the gendarmes (The Illustrated London News, 1891)

The escort then decided to take a route through the Belgrade Fortress. As demonstrators realized this intention, men started to pull the gendarmes from their horses, drove them off with stones, unharnessed the carriage horses, and, amid shouts of outrage, led the king's mother back to the palace. For the next hours, the palace was virtually besieged by thousands of people, enabling the police forces to enter and eventually intends to accompany Natalie to the royal castle. Natalie also spoke from the balcony, cherrished by endless applauses.

Around 6 p.m., the Royal Guard Cavalry supported by the infantry emerged from both Konak and the Ristic Palace directions, attempting to clear the streets. The crowds retreat from the advancing guards on Natalie's palace level. After repeated call of moving out of their way, cavalry riders charged the crowd with their sabers. Loyalists defended themselves by throwing stones. As many of the guardsmen were wounded and one even killed, the guard commander ordered to use fire weapons, resulting in death of two from the crowd and several wounded. All the windows of the nearest buildings were smashed. Between 9 and 10 p.m., military finally pushed the people out of the streets.

== Aftermath ==
On the situation (Kikeriki, 24 May 1891)

On the morning of 19 May, Natalie was taken to the Belgrade train station under a heavy escort and departed for Zemun by the express train. At the very same day, so-called Stupichtina Decree came into effect prohibiting Natalie to enter Serbia before his son's adulthood. In the following days Natalie travelled to the Kingdom of Romania.

In January 1893, the exiled royals Milan and Natalija reconciled and asked the Serbian government to revoke their divorce. The Metropolite and the synod declared the divorce act of 1888 illegal and the royal marriage still in force in March 1893. Shortly afterwards their son King Alexander declared himself mature and deposed the regency council in April 1893.

== See also ==
- Natalie of Serbia
- History of Belgrade
- List of riots
