= Natalie of Serbia =

Princess/Queen of Serbia from 1875 to 1889

- Cabinet photo of Natalie as princess consort

Queen consort of Serbia
- Tenure: 6 March 1882 – 6 March 1889

Princess consort of Serbia
- Tenure: 17 October 1875 – 6 March 1882
- Born: 15 May 1859; Florence, Grand Duchy of Tuscany
- Died: 8 May 1941 (aged 81); Saint-Denis, German-occupied France
- Burial: Old Cemetery of Lardy, Essonne
- Spouse: Milan I of Serbia
- Issue: Alexander I of Serbia; Prince Sergei
Names
- Natalija Obrenović
- House: Keșco (by birth); Obrenović (by marriage)
- Father: Colonel Petre Cheșcu
- Mother: Princess Pulcheria Sturdza

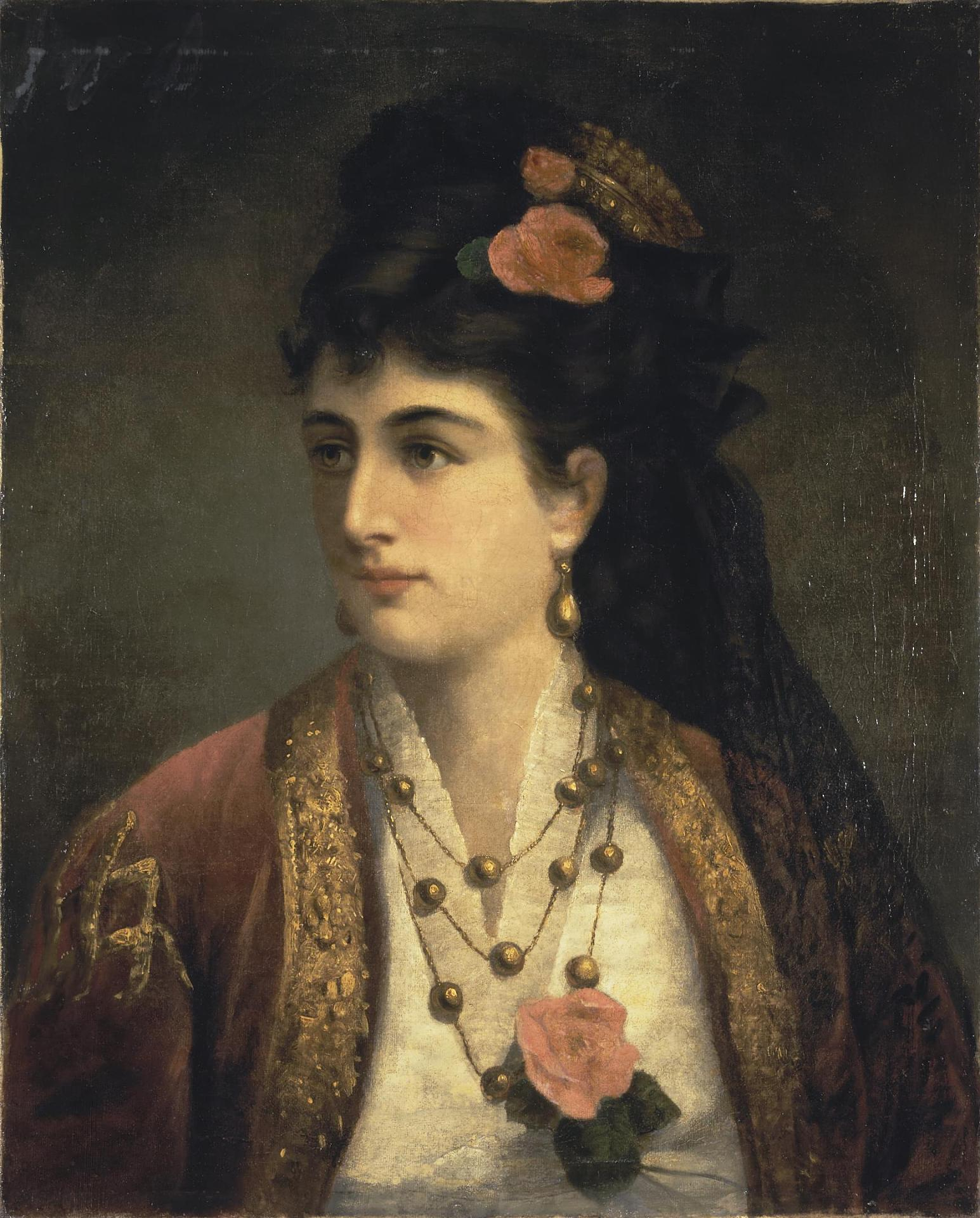
Portrait of Queen Natalie by Adèle Riché, 1875

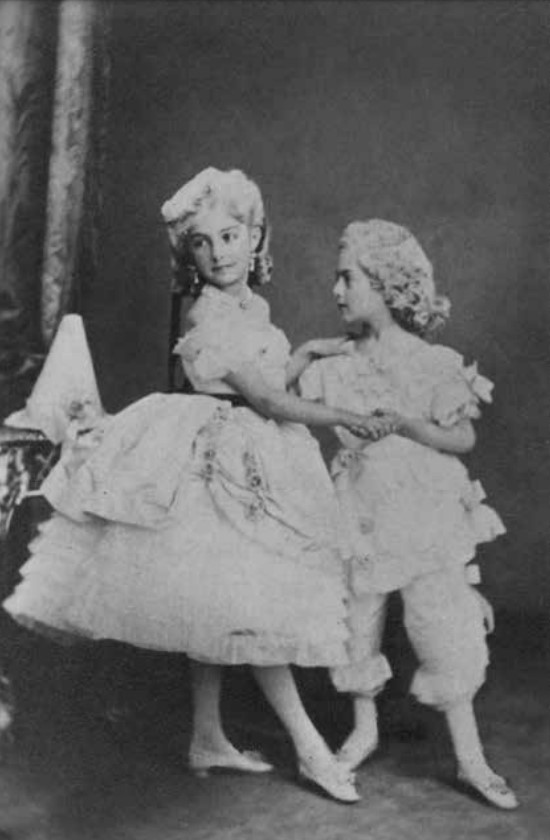
Natalie and her brother Ioan at a costume ball

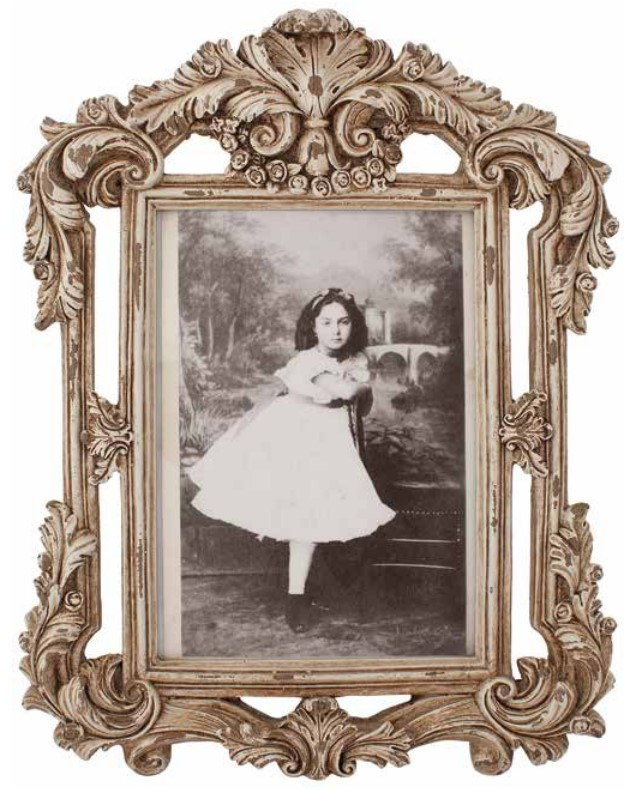
Natalie as a girl

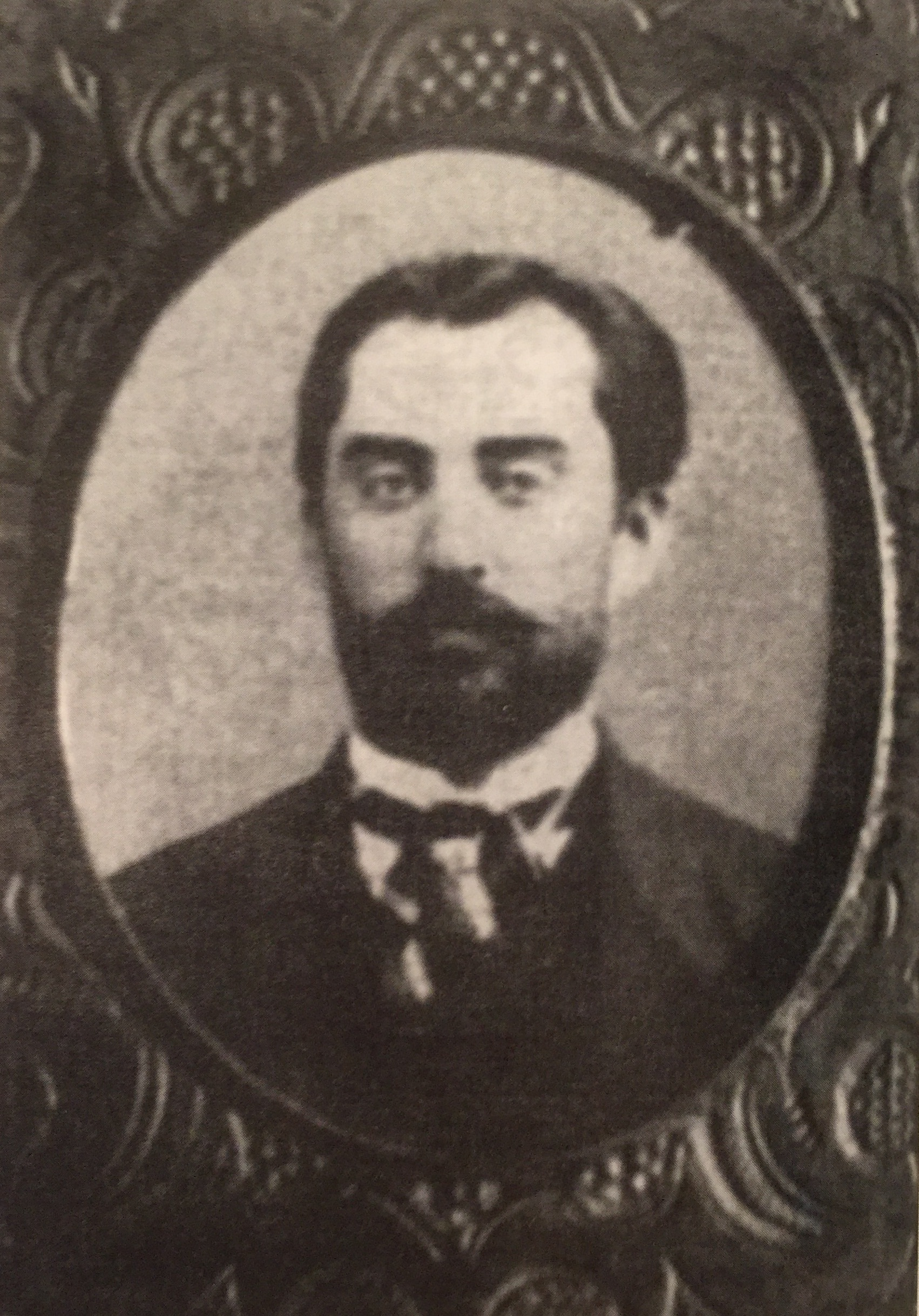
Colonel Peter Keshko, father of Queen Natalie

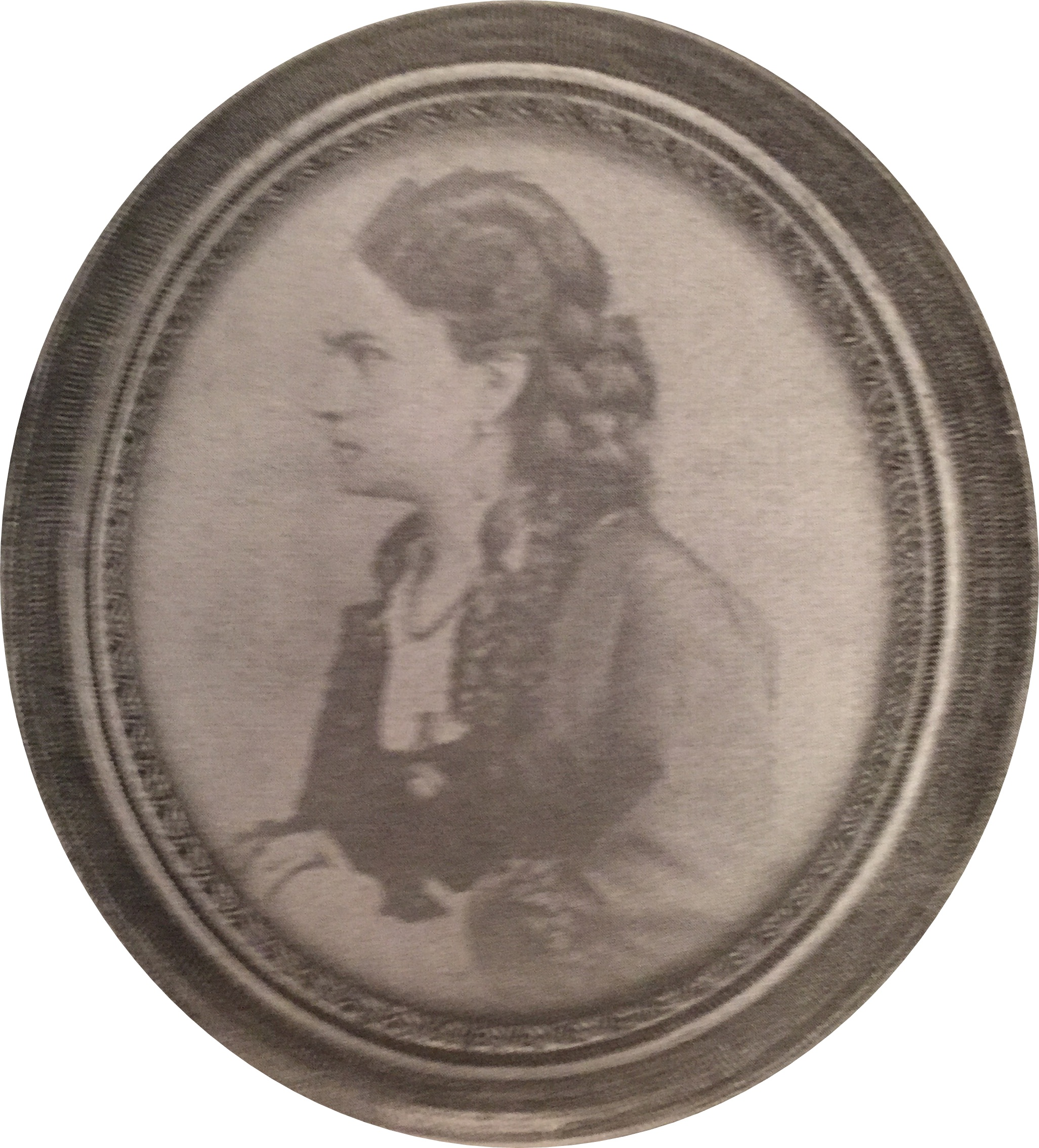
Princess Pulcheria Sturdza, Natalie's mother

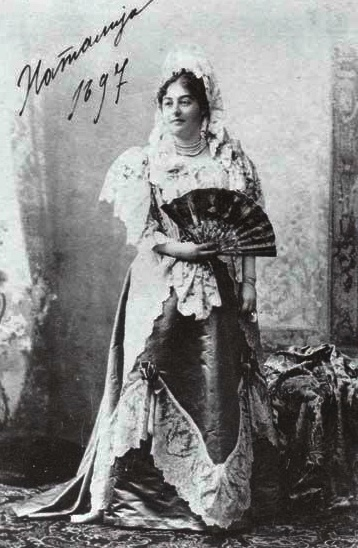
Queen Natalie in 1897

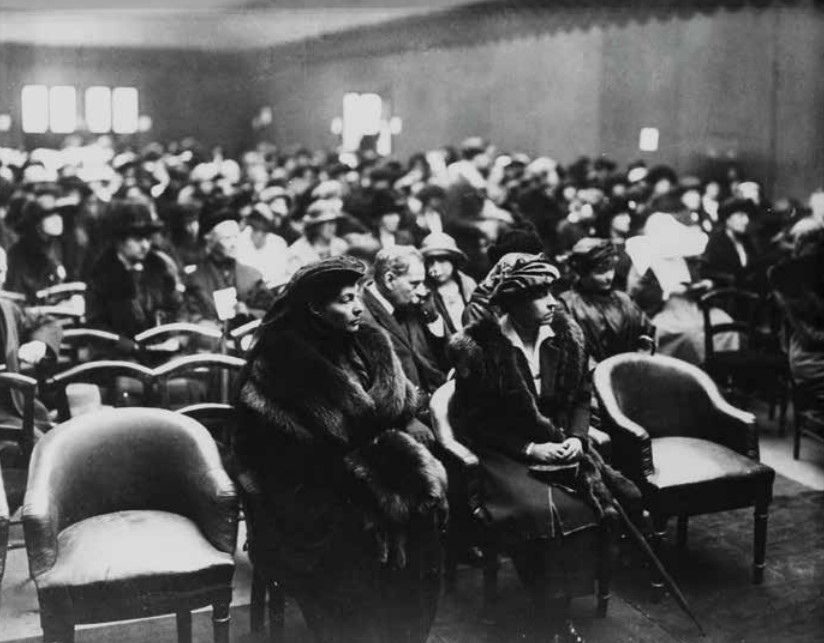
Queen Nathalie with Ružica Ruža Orešković, her lady-in-waiting and best friend, a relative of the poet Mira Alečković, Paris, beginning of 20th century

Natalija Obrenović (Serbian Cyrillic: Наталија Обреновић; 15 May 1859 – 8 May 1941), née Keshko (Romanian: Natalia Cheșcu; Russian: Наталья Кешко), known as Natalie of Serbia, was Princess of Serbia from 1875 to 1882 and then Queen of Serbia from 1882 to 1889 as the wife of Milan I of Serbia, born into the ancient Moldavian Keșco noble family.

A celebrated beauty during her youth, she was later regarded as one of the most beautiful queens in Europe.

== Early life and ancestry ==
She was born in 1859 in Florence, Grand Duchy of Tuscany (now Italy), into an old noble House of Keshko, as the first child of Russian colonel Petre Keșco of Bessarabia and his wife, Moldavian Princess Pulcheria Sturdza. Her father was the son of Ioan Keșco, a Marshal of Nobility of Bessarabia, and Romanian noblewoman Natalia Balș, daughter of Iordache Balș, Grand treasurer of Moldavia and Princess Ruxandra Sturdza. Maternally, she was granddaughter of Prince Nicolae Sturdza and Princess Maria Ghika. When her grandfather died, her grandmother Maria remarried to Prince Nicolae George Rosetti. Natalie's great-grandfather was Ioan Sandu Sturdza, the ruling Prince of Moldavia. She grew up in Dănuțeni, Bessarabia, Odessa, then part of the Russian Empire and Iași, United Romania.

She had two sisters and one brother:

- Marieta (Maria), who married on 13 April 1886 Prince Grigore Ghika-Brigadier.
- Ecaterina (Catherine), who married on 5 February 1883 their relative Prince Eugen Ghika-Comănești.
- Ioniță (John), only brother; he was the fourth and last child.

After being orphaned she was taken into the care by Prince Ivan Manucbey and raised along with his children. The other guardian was her eldest maternal aunt, Princess Ecaterina Sturdza, second wife of Prince Constantin Moruzi, Chamberlain at the Imperial Court of Russia.

== Princess and queen ==
Before the marriage, her second cousin, Prince Ivan Mikhailovich Obolensky, member of the Rurikid princely Obolensky family, made a proposal, but she declined. There were also hopes she would marry the Moldavian knyaz Grigore 'Grisha' Manukbey (1855–1902), a childhood friend who was enchanted by her. Eventually, she married Prince Milan Obrenović IV of Serbia on 17 October 1875, whom she previously met at a ball in Vienna, despite initial objections from both Muruzi and Manukbey families. They were second cousins, as her grandmother Nathalia was sister of Milan's grandmother Smaranda Balș, whose Balș family, although noble, dubiously claimed descent from an old medieval House of Balšić. A delegation from Romania, which included members of the Romanian noble families Moruzi and Catargiu (Milan's maternal family to whom Natalia was related), attended her wedding ceremony. She had two sons with him, the future King Alexander, born 1876, whose godfather was Tsar Alexander II of Russia, and his younger brother Sergei (Sergej), who, prematurely born, died just a four days after his birth in 1878.

When Prince Milan proclaimed the Kingdom of Serbia in 1882 after securing international recognition, Princess Natalie assumed the title and rank of a Queen.

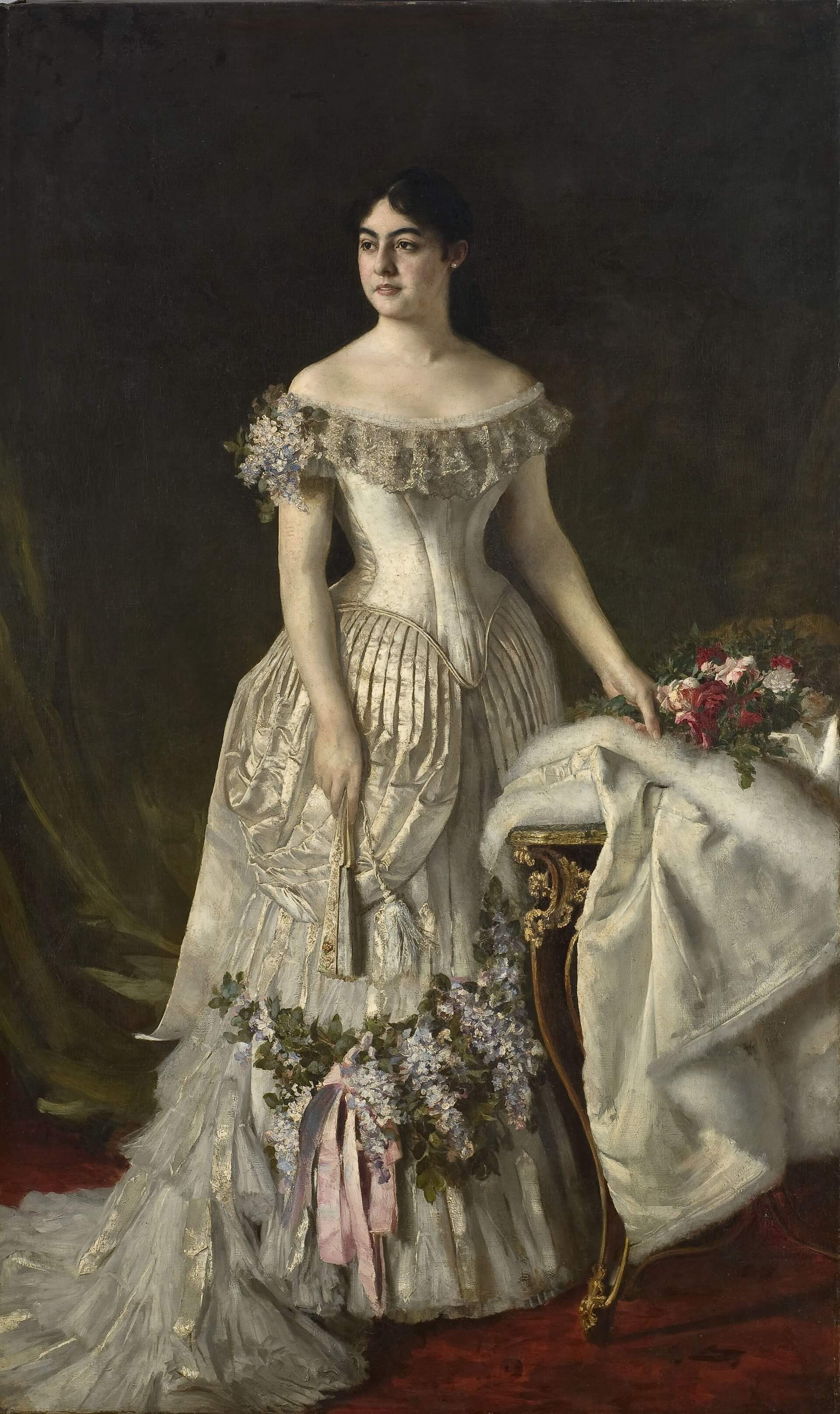
Portrait of Queen Natalie by Vlaho Bukovac, 1882

At the Easter reception of 1886, Queen Natalie publicly slapped the wife of the Greek ambassador. The Greek woman was rumored to have an affair with King Milan.

== Royal conflict and divorce ==
The relationship of the royal couple reached a critical level in 1887, following not only many affairs of the King with other women, but even political differences between King and Queen. The King pursued a pro-Austrian foreign policy which the Russian-born and slavophile Queen would not tolerate.

These conflict developed into a public scandal when the Queen – accompanied by her child, the eleven-year-old Crown Prince Alexander –left Serbia and settled in the Russian Crimea in May 1887. Slavophile public in Russia honoured the Serbian Queen demonstratively. Rumours spread about a royal divorce in the near future, and there was public talk about the King's abdication in favour of his son. These rumours proved to be premature - the divorce occurred one year later, the abdication followed in 1889. In July 1887, the Queen and her son returned to Belgrade, in August the Queen left her country again for Austria-Hungary. In October, the King and Queen met in Budapest for a formal reconciliation, and with the King's approval the Queen and the Crown Prince left for another foreign travel to Italy until November.

In 1888, Queen Natalie and her son left for another long foreign stay in Wiesbaden, without intention to return to Belgrade. The scandal turned into politics when the King used the German police in July 1888 to bring the young Crown Prince back to his kingdom.

Soon afterwards King Milan opened the ecclesiastical procedures of divorce. Even the development of these procedures put a shadow on the royal reputation. The Holy Synod of the Serbian Orthodox Church met in Belgrade and declared itself incompetent in the royal divorce. When the consistorium of Belgrade took over the case the Queen rejected the King's wish for divorce and advocated the several attempts to reconcile the couple according to ecclesiastical law. When the King managed to get his divorce by a single decision of the Metropolite of the Serbian church, the Queen rejected that decision in public and demanded a return to Belgrade.

An immediate political consequence of these dynastic conflicts was the new right of succession to the throne proclaimed during the parliamentary sessions regarding the new constitution of Serbia. The new constitution declared Crown Prince Alexander and his future children (that were never born) to be single legal heirs of the Serbian crown. Possible children of a second marriage of King Milan should be excluded from succession even in the case that King Alexander's line should become extinct. A clear votum of mistrust for the former king in the handling of his family affairs that foreshadowed his following abdication in March 1889.

== Conflicts with the Regency and private reconciliation ==
On 6 March 1889, as consequence of the surprising abdication of her (former) husband, Natalie's son Alexander I became King of Serbia. Until 1893, when Alexander assumed government himself, he was put under a regency council led by former prime minister Jovan Ristic. The former King Milan secured the educational rights for his son for himself and ordered the regency council not to allow the Queen Mother a permanent stay in Serbia during the minority of King Alexander. Short meetings between mother and son in foreign countries should be possible with permission of the regency.

Queen Natalie did not accept these restricted conditions. In August 1889, she announced publicly to visit her son in the royal palace in Belgrade. She demanded to see her son every Sunday and holiday, but was offered to see him twice a year instead with King Milan regulating. When the Queen Mother arrived in Belgrade on 29 August 1889, she was enthusiastically welcomed by the population.

But the regency denied her royal style (she should be announced just as Mme Keshko) and - after she insisted to be still the ex-king's wife and rightful Queen of Serbia - any meeting with her son. In October 1889 the ex-king and the regents allowed meetings between mother and son every 14 days - but strictly outside the royal palace.

In July 1890, the Synod of the Serbian Orthodox church declared the divorce between Milan and Natalie to be legal.

In April 1891, ex-king Milan –after several interferences in government affairs – announced his intention to leave Serbia until his son should be old enough to take over the rule. The parliament instructed the government to ask Queen Mother Natalie to act accordingly. When the Queen refused to leave the country, the police attempted to expel her by force on 18 May 1891. However, a massive crowd of civilians gathered in the streets and fought the gendarmerie and the military, managing to stop the carriage and accompany the Queen back to the palace. Following gendarmerie and military purge action resulted in two being killed and several wounded. The next day the whole force of the garrison was used to send her into exile.

In January 1893, the exiled royals Milan and Natalija reconciled and asked the Serbian government to revoke their divorce. The Metropolite and the synod declared the divorce act of 1888 illegal and the royal marriage still in force in March 1893.

Shortly afterwards their son King Alexander declared himself mature and deposed the regency council in April 1893.

== Return, second exile and death ==
After ex-king Milan had returned to Serbia in January 1894 and took the position as deputy of his son and commander-in-chief of the army, King Alexander ordered the complete rehabilitation of his parents and the restoration of their royal prerogatives in April 1894 - despite the protests of the radical opposition. Natalie, who lived mainly in France, returned to Belgrade not before May 1895 but kept her habit of frequent foreign travels.

When King Alexander affianced himself with Draga Mašin, a court lady of Queen Natalie, in 1900, his parents rejected the future queen as an improper and impossible choice. His parents had previously arranged a marriage to a suitable German Princess Alexandra Karoline of Schaumburg-Lippe, sister of the Queen of Württemberg, which never took place. After that, ex-king Milan resigned as army commander and left Serbia for the rest of his life; he died in Vienna a year later, in 1901. Even the relationship between Natalie and Alexander was broken up. Because the Queen Mother was a strong opponent of her son's marriage to Draga, Natalie was banished from Serbia by her son.

King Alexander and his wife Draga were killed in 1903 during a military coup. This left Natalie the sole member of the Obrenović dynasty. She donated the inheritance to the University of Belgrade and various churches and monasteries around Serbia. The same year, Queen Natalie became a member of the Roman Catholic Church and a nun, converting from Serbian Orthodoxy.

Queen Natalie spent the remaining years of her life in exile in France under the name Comtesse de Roudnik (Countess of Rudnik), which stood in her diplomatic passport, opting to officially hide her true identity. Throughout her exile, she received her regular stipend via the Rothschild family, a financial arrangement that continued both before and after the passing of her husband and son.

The last winter before she died in 1941, she spent with her French friend, Jehanne Henriette Emilie Vivaux, née Piarron de Mondesir (1886-1966), niece of General Jean Frédéric Lucien Piarron de Mondésir in Lardy, Essonne, a small town near Paris, where she was buried at the local cemetery. There is still a dispute where exactly she died, some sources say it was in Saint-Denis, France, while other sources indicate Paris. Her memoirs were kept in the Vatican, but were published in Belgrade in 1999.

== Gallery ==
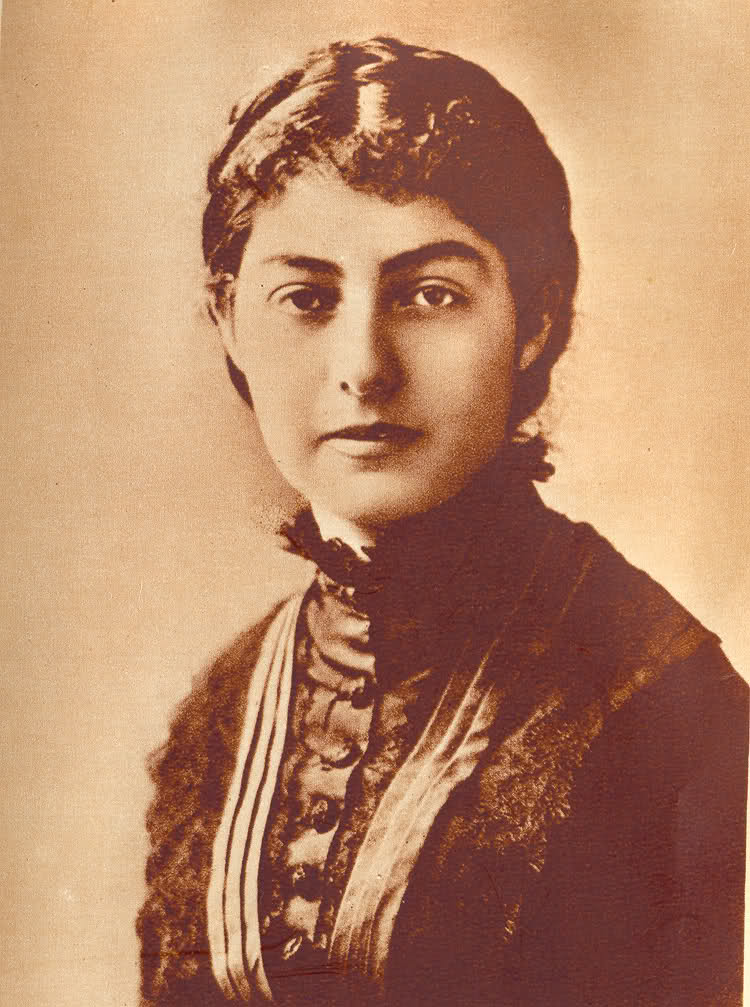
Queen Natalie c.1875–1889

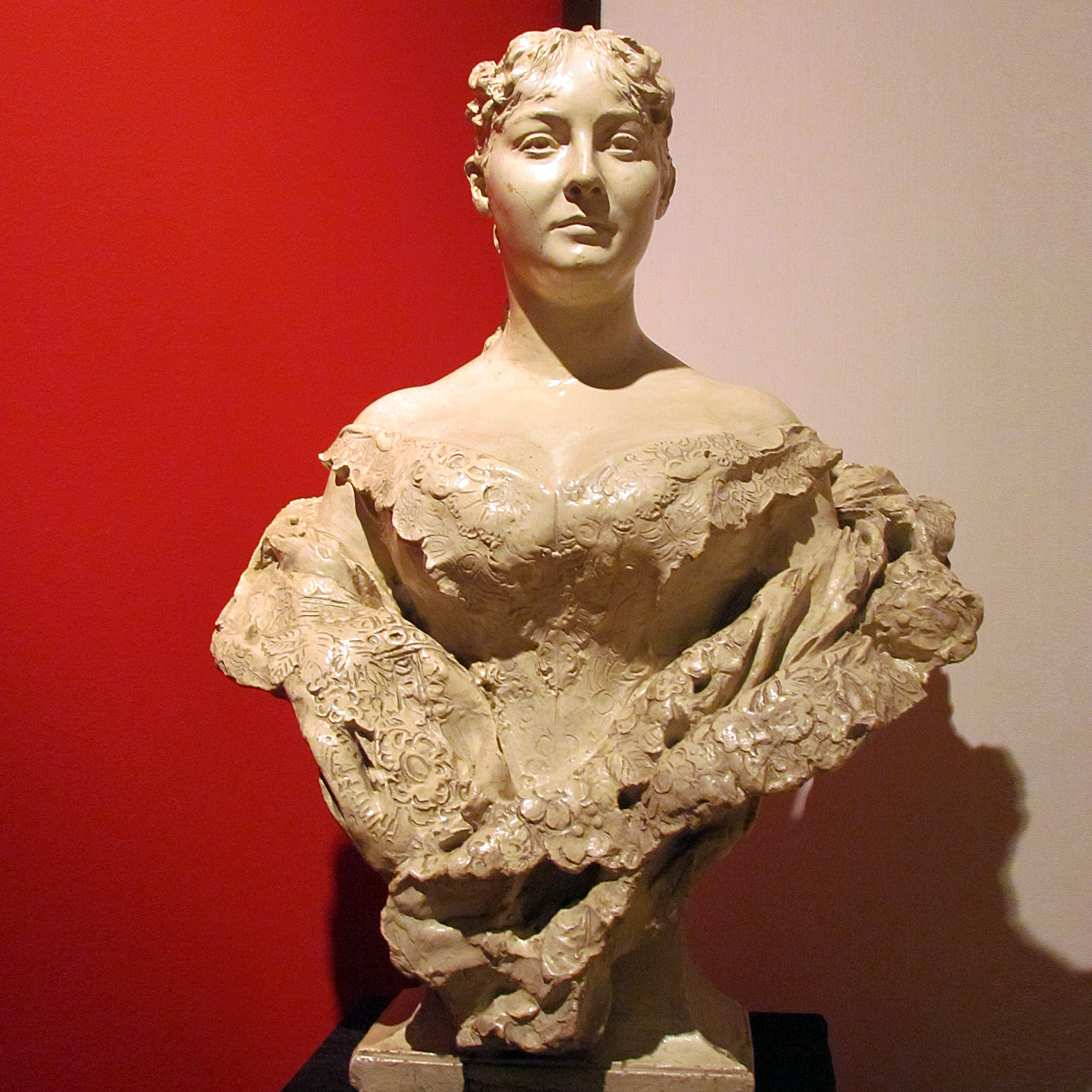
Bust of Natalija Obrenović Queen of Serbia by Alajos Stróbl, Historical Museum of Serbia

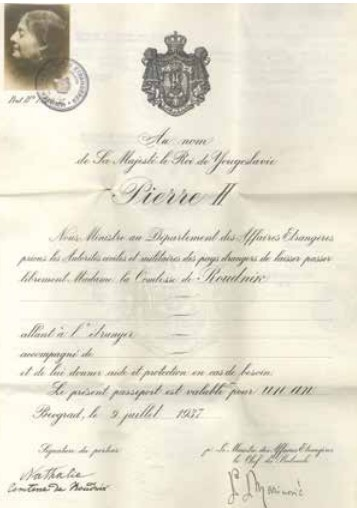
Diplomatic passport of Queen Natalie, issued in 1937 under the name Comtesse de Roudnik by King Peter II of Yugoslavia

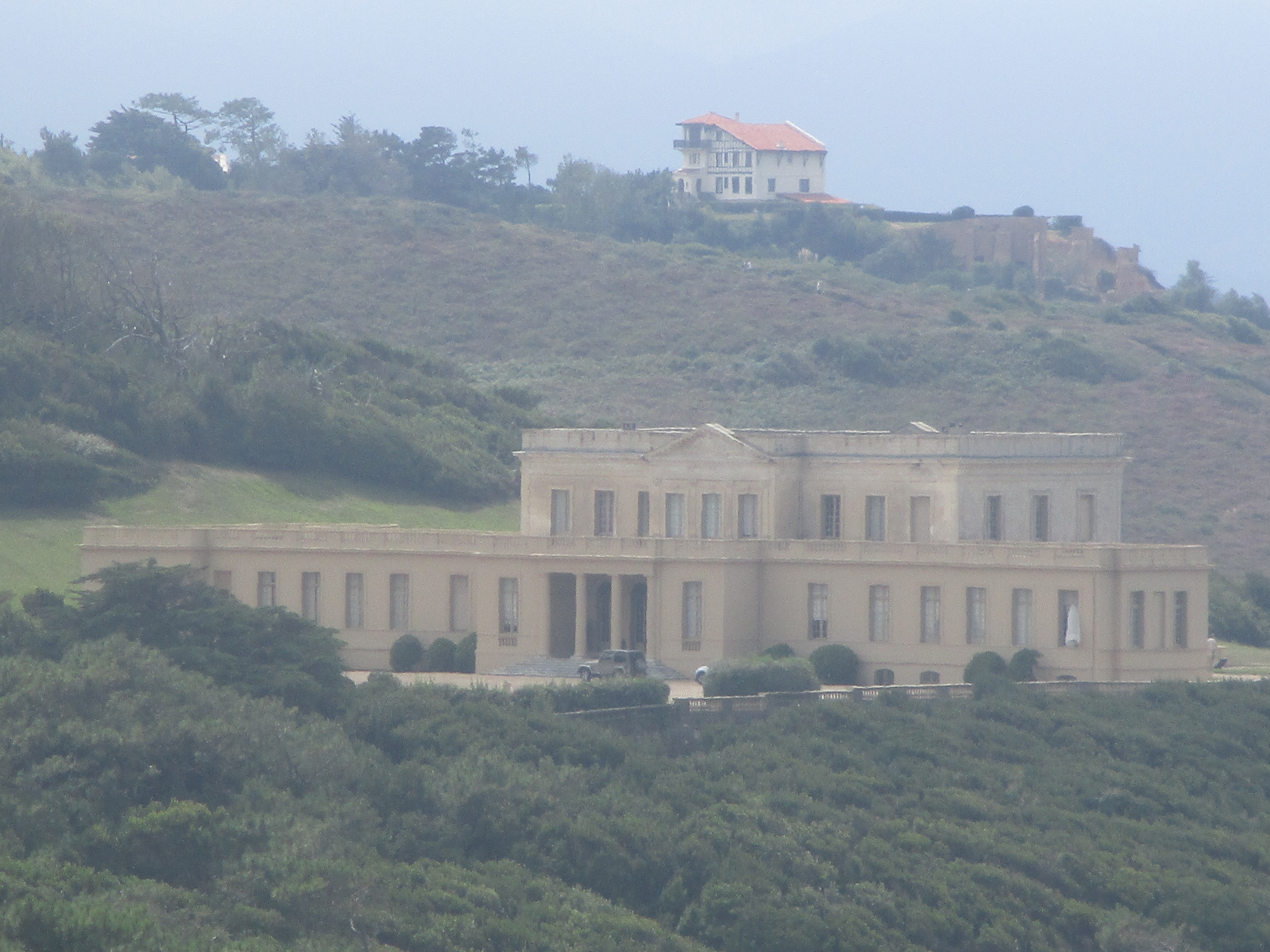
Villa Sacchino in Biarritz, France, the exile home of Queen Natalie, named after her son, King Alexander I of Serbia

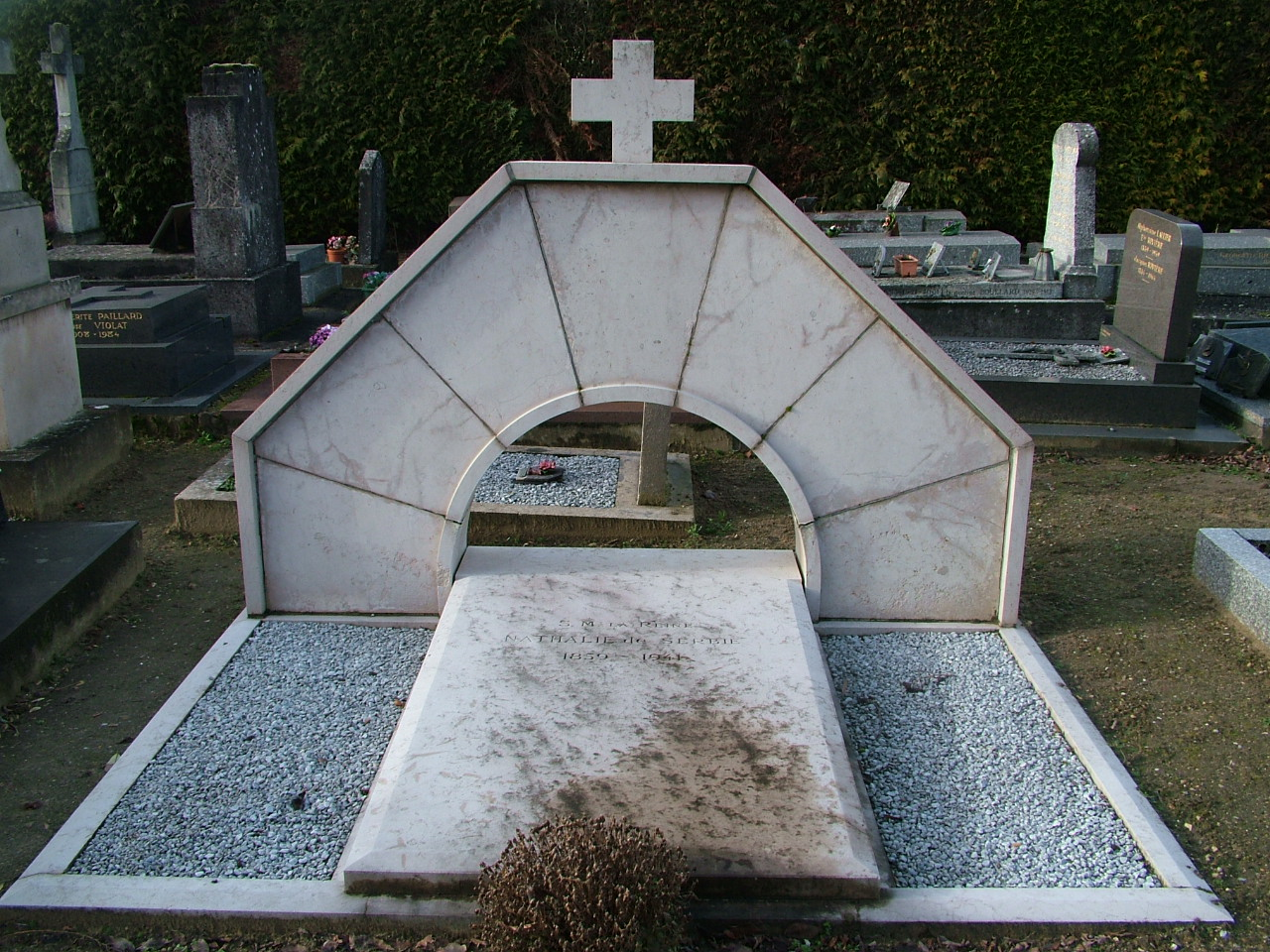
Grave of Queen Natalie in Lardy

== Sources ==
- Vulpe, Viorica (2012). "Momente și personalități ale dinastiei Keșco". Curaj.
- Mitican, Ion (2008). "Regina Serbiei, în vizită la bunica de la Iaşi". Ziarul Lumina.

Royal titles
Preceded by Júlia Hunyady von Kéthely	Princess consort of Serbia; 17 October 1875 – 6 March 1882	Succeeded by Herself as Queen consort
Preceded by Herself as Princess consort	Queen consort of Serbia; 6 March 1882 – 6 March 1889	Succeeded by Draga Mašin
