= Keșco =

Moldavian noble family

Family arms (17th century)

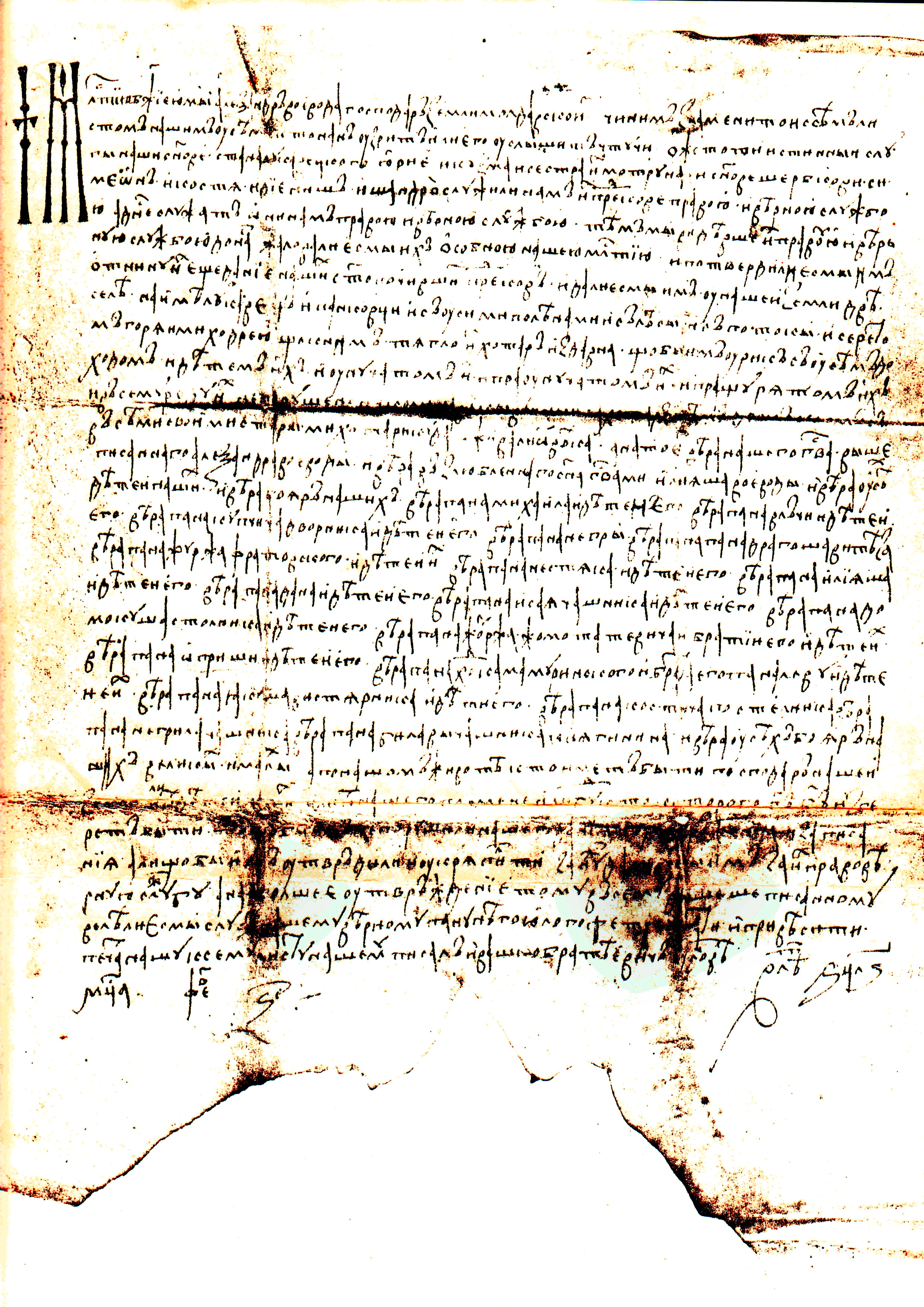
Family certificate from Feb. 16, 1428 confirming their hereditary nobility and their estates issued by Alexander I "the Good"

The House of Keșco or Cheșco/Keșcu/Cheșcu (Russian: Кешко; English: Keshko, Romanian: Cheșcu), was an ancient Moldavian boyar (noble) family whose members held significant positions in Moldavia and later in the Russian Empire and Romania. Most notable member was Natalia Keshko, who became the first modern Queen of Serbia.

== History ==
According to historian Johann Svoboda, the family had its roots in Kievan Rus, where members of the family appeared in 1097 as Knyazen in the Principality of Kiev. According to him, the family has descended from the Rurik dynasty, in particular from the Wassilko, Prince of Rostov (1209–1238).

== In Moldavia ==
Historically, the family was established even before the Principality of Moldova was founded in 1350. They owned the forest on the left bank of the Sereth river, Panka region, Mihodra river valley and founded Lucavăţ, which was all owned by Luca, member of the family. The family is said to be, along with the House of Dragoș, the oldest in this region. Luca's sons Stan and Șerbco were knights at the court of Prince Alexander I of Moldavia. He officially confirmed their family possessions of Lucavăţ, Panka with Mihodra with hereditary rights for their descendants by the document of February 16, 1428.

The church of Lucavăţ became first seat of Bishopric of Rădăuți, with its pastor, by proclamation of Prince Stephen the Great of Moldavia became its first Bishop on March 15, 1490. Prince Alexandru Lăpușneanu of Moldavia, grandson of Prince Alexander "the Good", not only confirmed the legality of the certificate issued by his grandfather on May 7, 1565, but also subsequently transferred to the family the co-ownership of a large number of villages in northern Moldova which expanded the land they owned. Later, during 17th century, brothers Vasile, Nicolae and Constantin Căzăcescul were again officially confirmed ownership of all their expanded possessions by Prince Illias III of Moldavia on March 12, 1667.

== Wassilko von Serecki ==
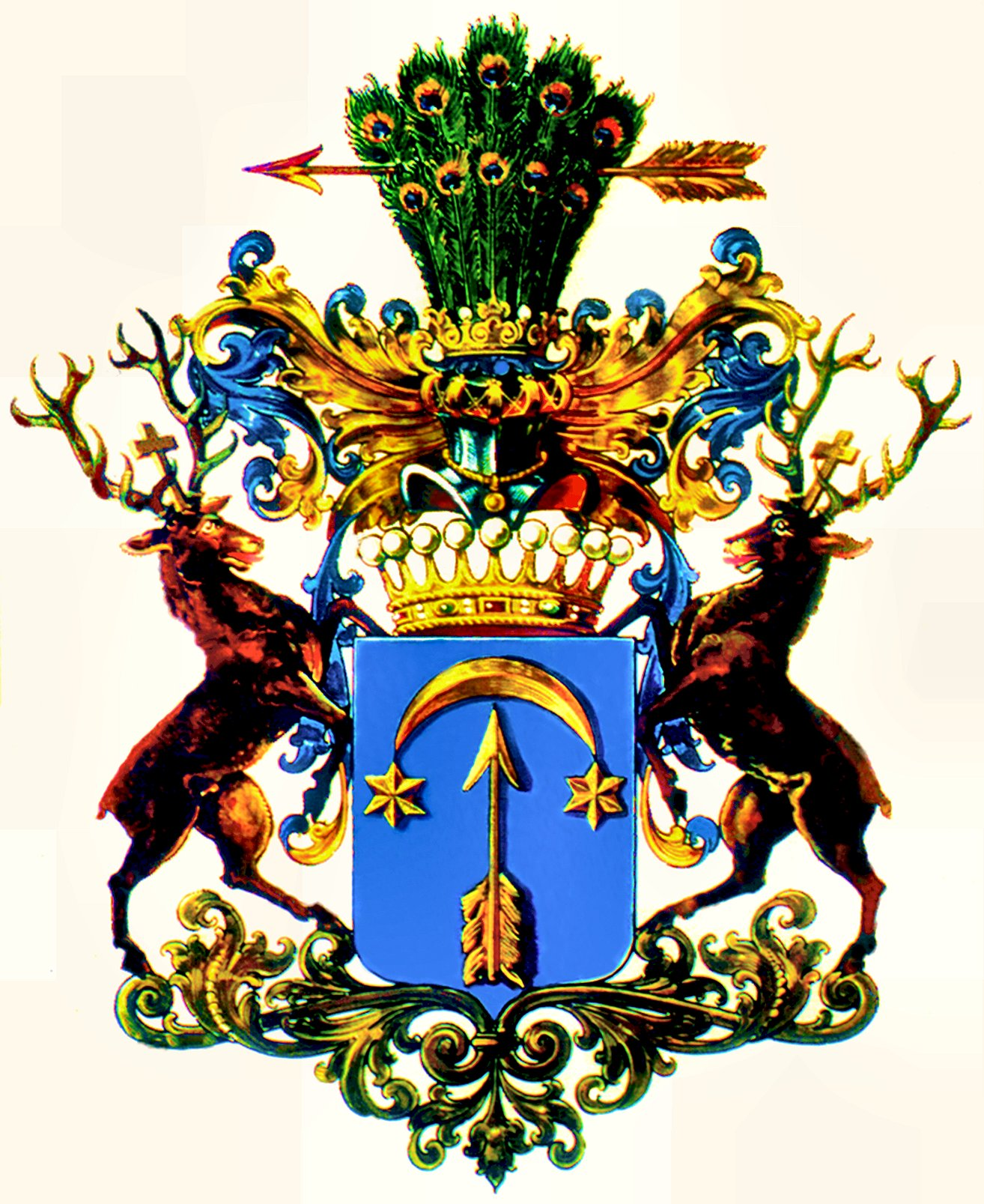
Coat of arms of Counts Wassilko von Serecki

Vasile (Basilius) (1631–1701), the eldest of the above mentioned brothers, married in 1654 Candachia Cocoranul (1635–1688), the daughter of the Boyar Isac Cocoranul. He was, as historian Teodor Bălan wrote, the ancestor of the Counts Wassilko von Serecki, who were later one of the largest landowners in Austro-Hungarian Empire and the only family of ethnic Romanian origin to acquire the title of Count throughout the Empire.

== Keshko family name ==
It was first mentioned as such in the 17th century. Constantin the Căzăcescul, younger brother of the above mentioned Vasile (Basilius) (1631–1701) and Nicolae, got confirmed in 1667 his noble status and his possessions in the Principality of Moldova by ruling Prince Illias III. His descendants kept using his nickname as their family name, making him an ancestor of the Keshko (Keșco/Keșcu/Cheșco/Cheșcu) family, which in turn made them collateral branch of Counts Wassilko von Serecki.

== In the Russian Empire ==
Members of the Keshko family served the Russian Empire. As such, they were granted the title of Marshals of Nobility of the Bessarabia Governorate (1812–1917) where they held large properties. Throughout the years they were also incorporated into the Russian nobility, apart from already belonging to Romanian and Moldavian nobility.

== Family tree ==
- Constantin Căzăcescul, whose descendants adopted and used Keșco version of his nickname as their official surname, married Irina Ţica, daughter of Eni Ţica, Great Pitar of Moldavia
  - Gheorghe Keșco, married Ilinca Stârcea, daughter of Ioan Stârcea
    - Peter Keșco (died in 1790), married firstly Balasa Vârnav; married secondly Ecaterina Kogălniceanu
      - Maria Keșco, married Şeptilici
      - daughter, married Gheorghe, a Captain in Moldavian army
      - Ioniță Keșco (died in 1817), married Tsaritsa Costache (Costaki) (born in 1785), daughter of Manolache Costaki and Princess Ileana Rosetti
        - Ioan Keșco (1809–1863), Great Vornic of Moldavia, Russian Marshal of Nobility in Bessarabia, married firstly Romanian noblewoman Natalia Balș (1812–1830), daughter of Iordache Balș, Grand treasurer of Moldova and Princess Ruxandra Sturdza (1785–1844), married secondly Zamfira Calmuțchi (Kalmuțki) (1819-1881), daughter of Gheorghe Calmuțchi
          - Petre Keșco (1830–1865), Colonel in Russian Imperial Army, married his relative Princess Pulcheria Sturdza of Moldavia (1831–1874)
            - Natalie Keșco, Queen consort of Serbia (1859–1941) married her second cousin, King Milan I of Serbia.
            - Ioniță (Ioann) Keșco (1860-1877), the only brother of the Keșco family
            - Maria Keșco (1861–1935), who married on 13 April 1886 Prince Grigor Ghica-Brigadier (1847–1913).
            - Ioana Ecaterina Keșco (1864-1954), who married on 5 February 1883 her relative Prince Eugen Ghica-Comănești (1840–1912).
          - Viktoria Keșco (1835-1856), after capturing the heart of Archduke Ferdinand Maximilian in Vienna, her father forcefully married her off to her brothers comrade and her longtime admirer, Bessarabian nobleman of Greek descent Alexander Dimitrievich Inglezi (1826-1903), son of Dimitri Spiridonovich Inglezi (1771-1846).
        - Viktoria Keșco (born in 1802), who married Belarusian nobleman Felix Wakar, Korwin Coat of Arms (1792-1865).
        - Gheorghe Keșco (born in 1813)
      - Mihalche Keșco
        - Constantin Keşco
        - Ilinca Keşco
        - Nastasia Keşco, married Ilie Crâste, awarded the title of Baron in 1787, Ispravnic and Șătrar
  - Mihail Keșco (died in 1727)

== Family members ==
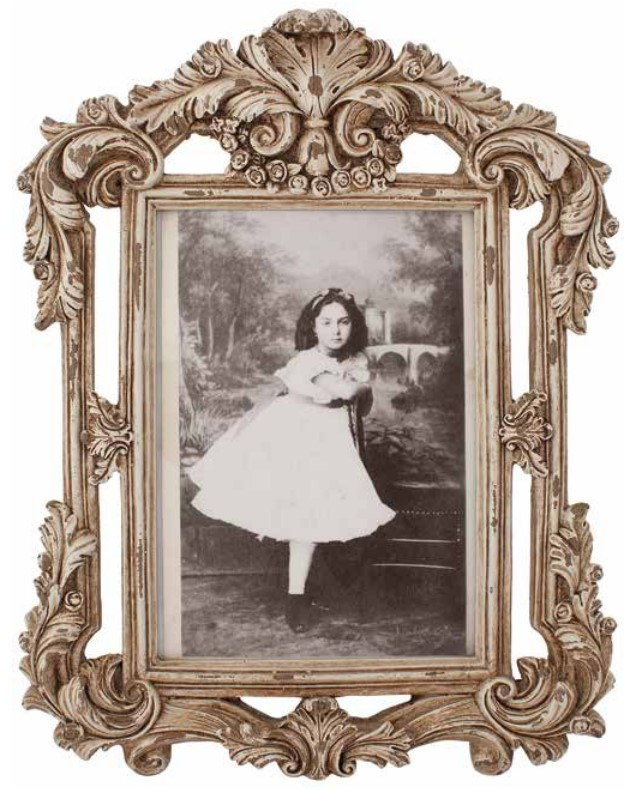
Natalie as a ten year old girl, photo taken in 1869

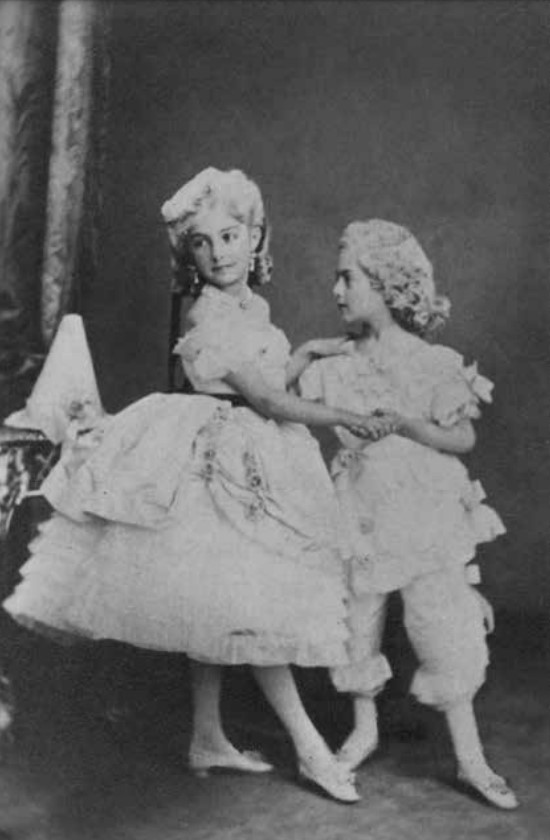
Natalie and her brother Ioan Keshko at a costume ball

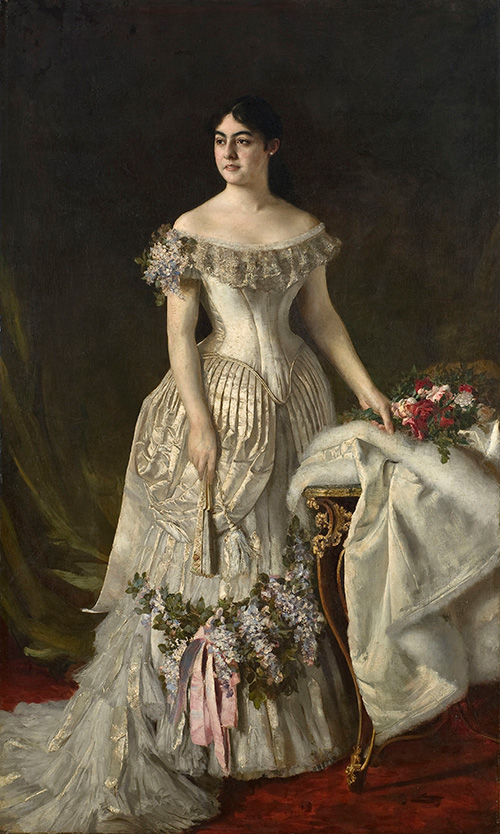
Portrait Natalie Keshko, Queen of Serbia, currently displayed in National Museum of Serbia

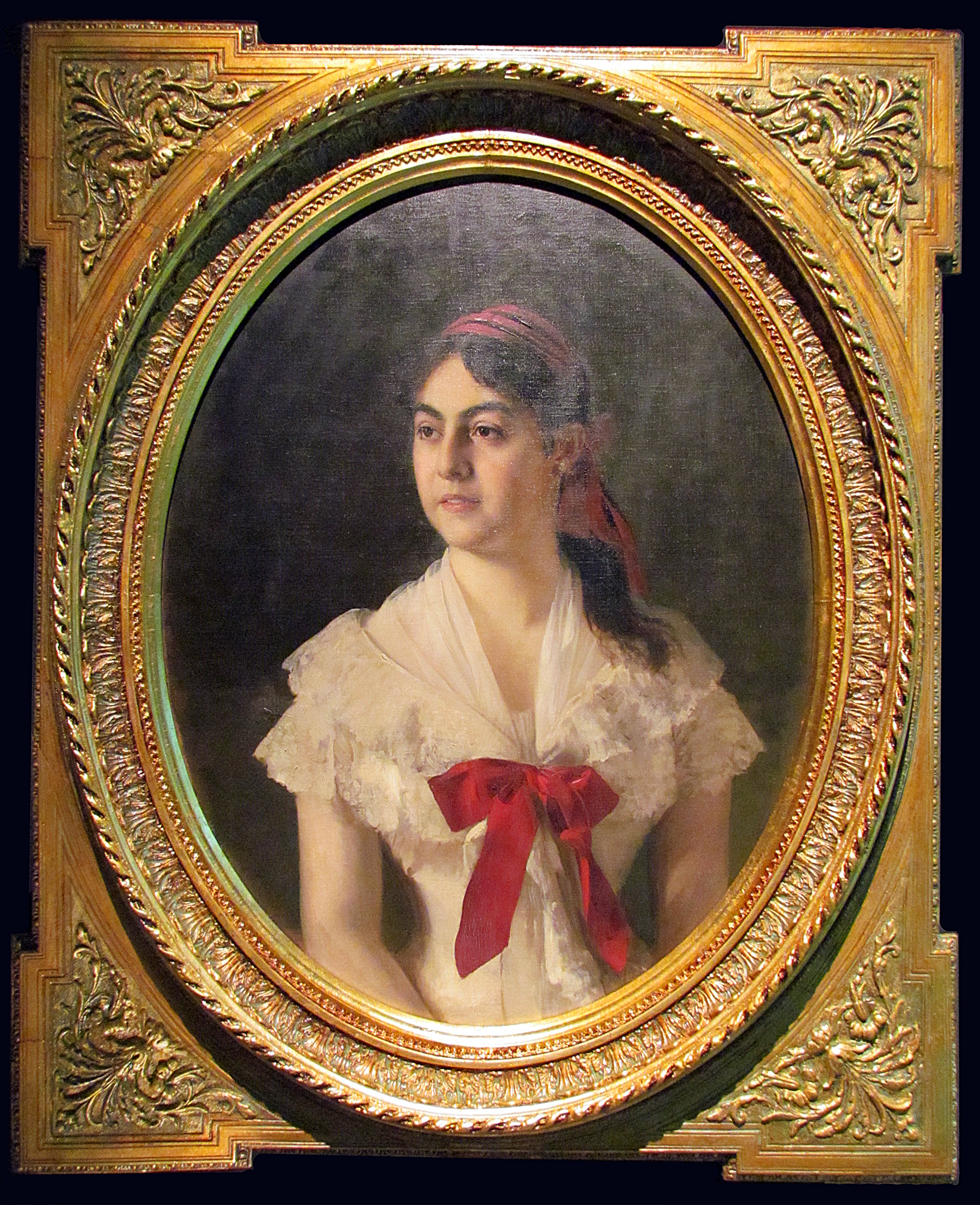
Another portrait of Queen Natalie by painter Vlaho Bukovac

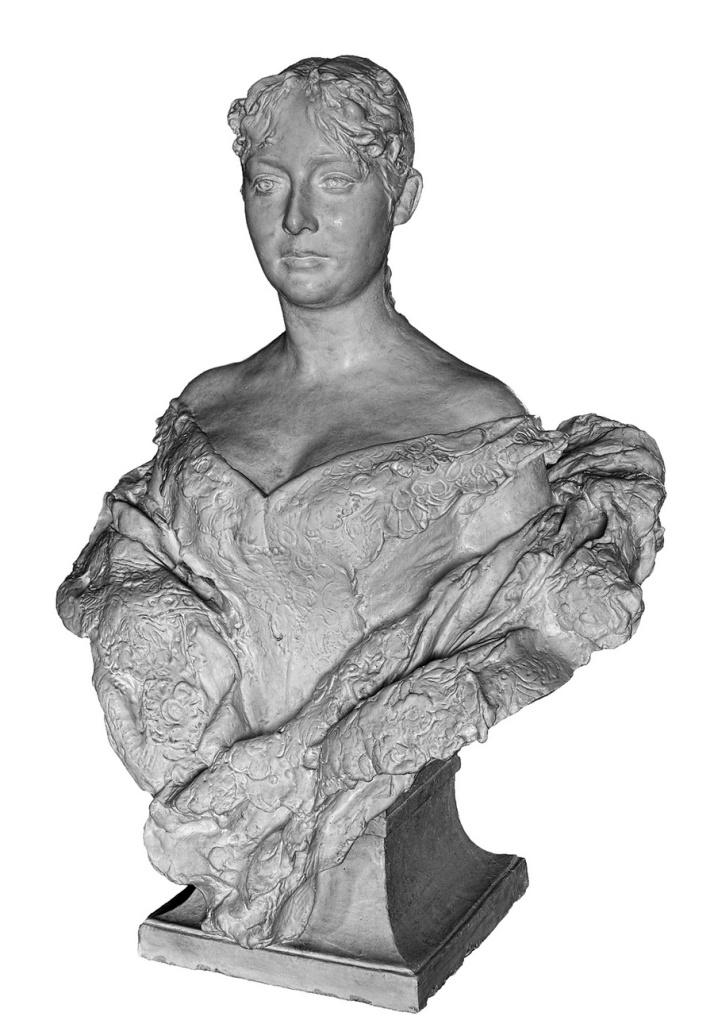
Bust of Queen Natalie by Hungarian sculptor and artist Alajos Stróbl

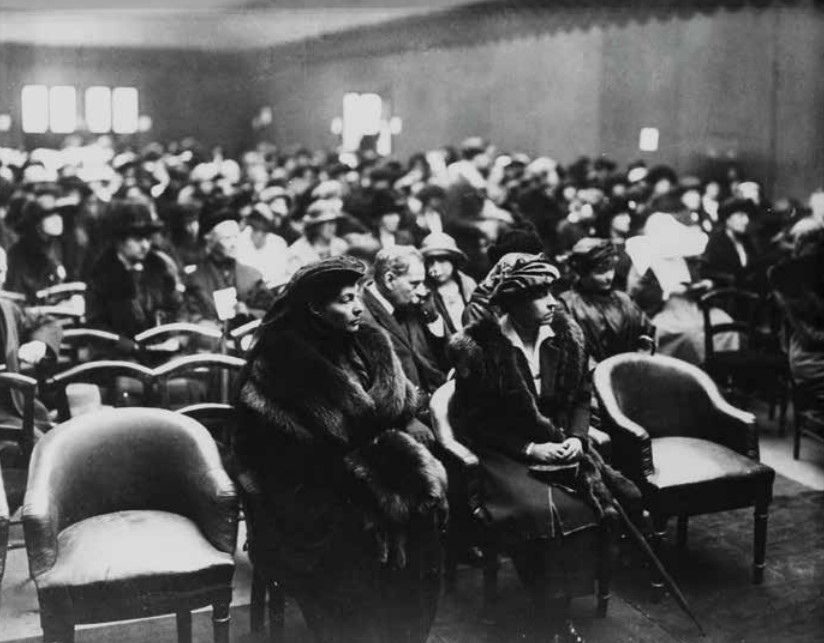
Queen Natalie during her exile in Paris with her lady in waiting

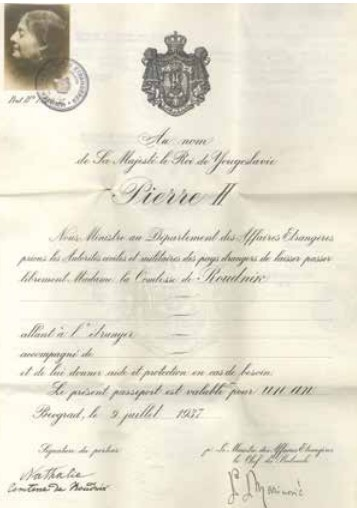
Diplomatic passport of Queen Natalie issued on 9 July 1937, at the Royal Yugoslav Consulate in Paris, in the name of Nathalie, Countess of Rudnik stating that she was born in 1859 in Florence, as Nathalie Keshko. The document was signed by King Peter II of Yugoslavia

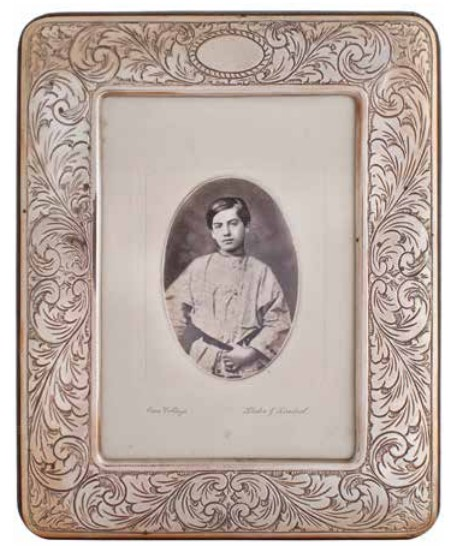
Ioan Keshko (1860-1877), brother of Queen Natalie,photo taken in 1873

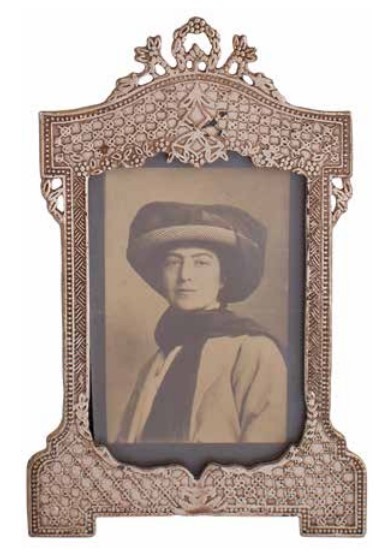
Ioana Ecaterina Keshko (1864-1954), later Princess Ghica, sister of Queen Natalie, photo taken in 1905

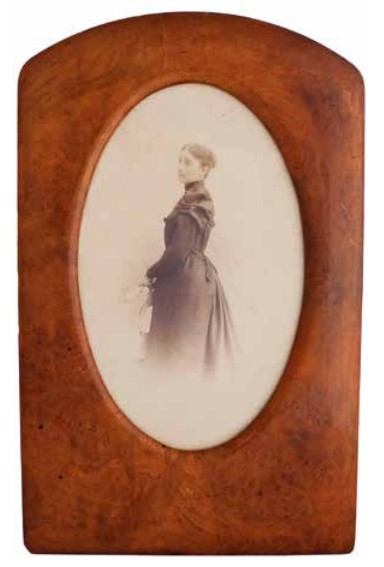
Marieta Keshko (1861-1935), later Princess Ghica, sister of Queen Natalie, photo taken in 1905

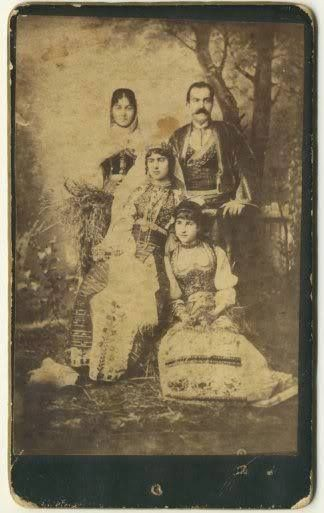
Natalie, Marieta and Ioana Ecaterina Keshko with Milan I of Serbia

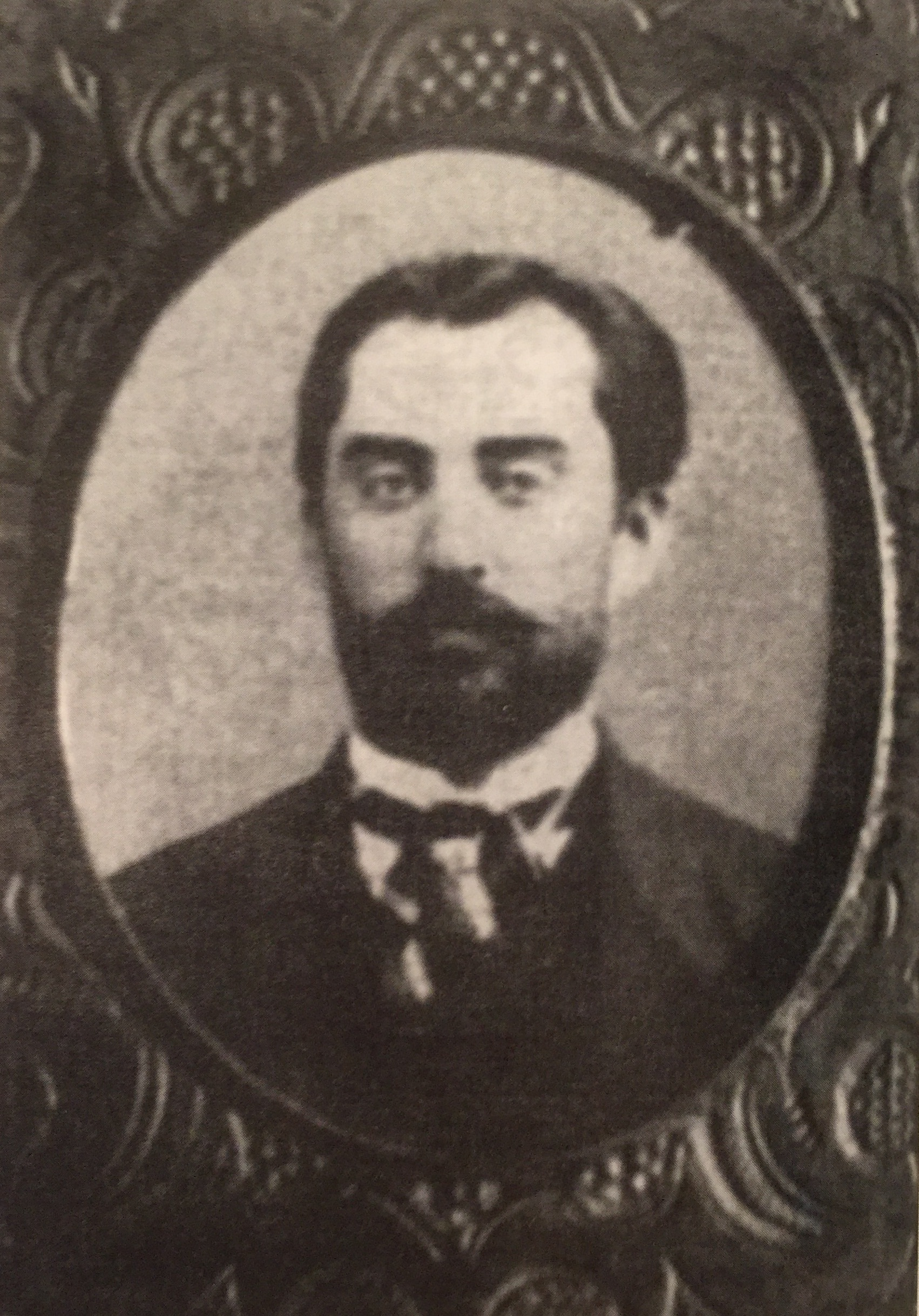
Peter Keshko (1830-1865), father of Queen Natalie

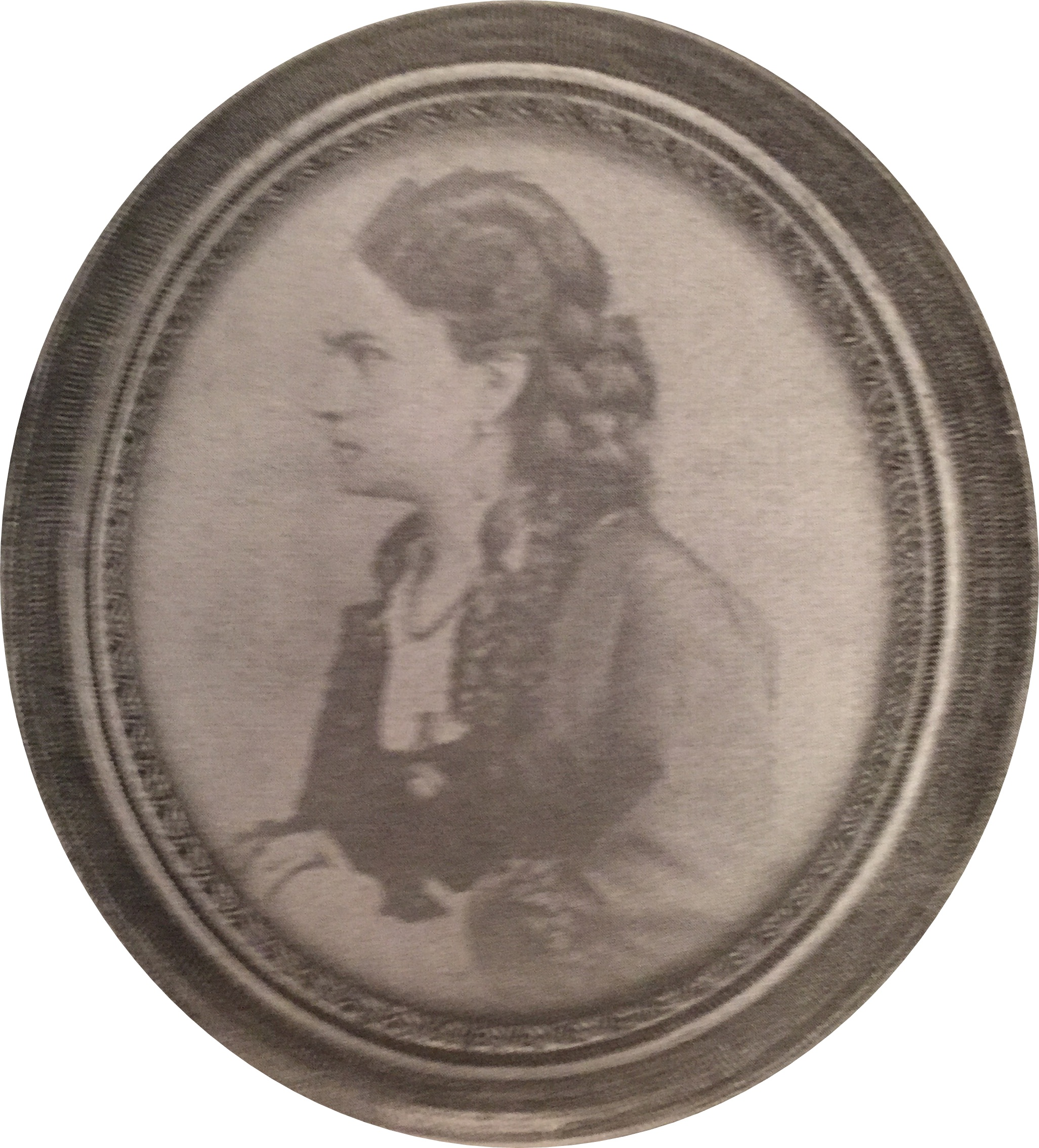
Pulcheria Keshko (1831-1874), mother of Queen Natalie

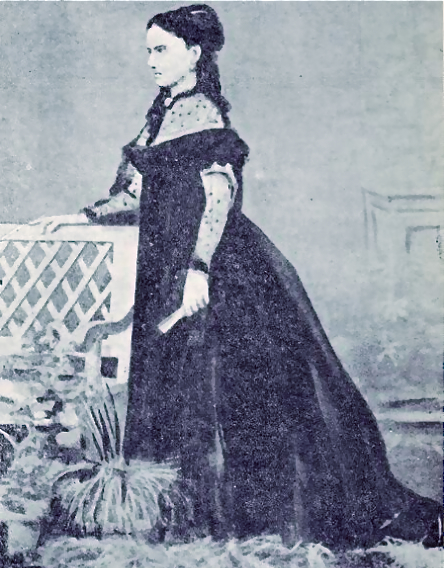
Pulcheria Keshko, née Princess Sturdza (1831-1874)

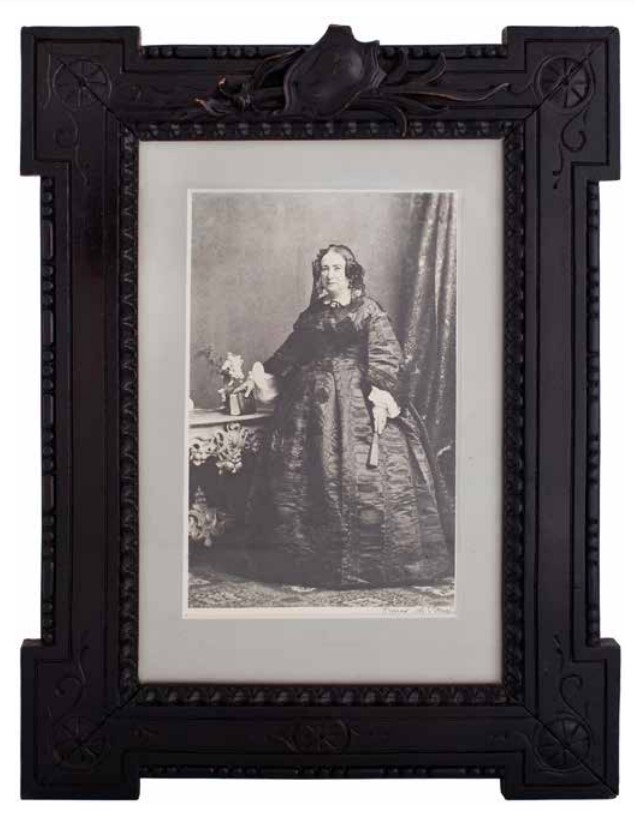
Princess Maria Rosetti (1805-1887), mother of Pulcheria Keshko (1831-1874) and grandmother of Queen Natalie, photo taken around 1875

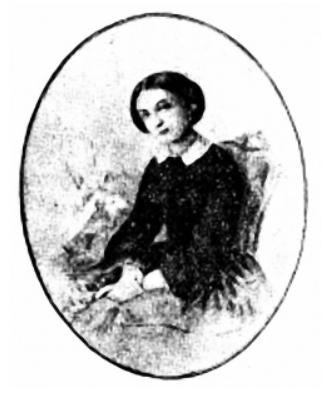
Viktoria Keshko (1835–1856), aunt of Queen Natalie and first love of Maximilian I of Mexico

== Properties ==
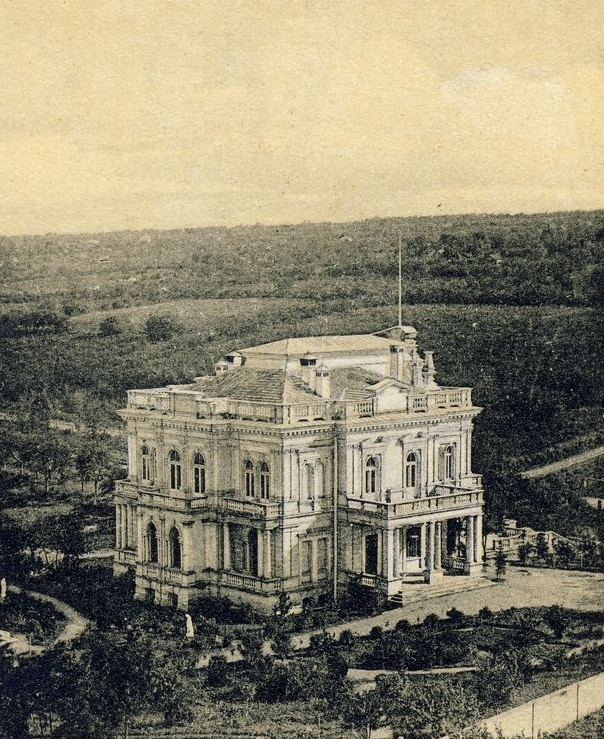
Villa in Kishinev, built for Queen Natalie Obrenovic, Dowager Queen of Serbia, later owned by Russian merchant Gheorghii Pronin

== Sources ==
- Lecca, Octav-George; Caragiale, Mateiu I. (2000) [1899]. Familiile boierești române: istorie și genealogie : după izvoare autentice. Libra. ISBN 978-973-99914-4-5.
