= Vukomanović =

Vukomanović (Cyrillic script: Вукомановић) is a surname from former Yugoslavia notably seen in Serbia, Bosnia-Herzegovina, and Croatia. Vukomanović is derived from “vuk” meaning ”wolf.” Notable people with the surname include:

- Marin Vukomanović (born 1999), Croatian footballer
- Dejan Vukomanović (born 1990), Bosnian footballer
- Branislav Vukomanović (born 1981), Serbian footballer
- Ivan Vukomanović (born 1977), Serbian footballer and head coach of Kerala Blasters
- Leontina Vukomanović (born 1970), female singer from Serbia
- Mladen Vukomanović, vice-president of IPMA Croatia
- Ljubica Vukomanović (1788–1843), Serbian royal consort
- Mirjana Vukomanović (born 1967), Serbian film, television and theater director
