= Milan I of Serbia =

Monarch of Serbia from 1868 to 1889

Milan I Милан I Обреновић
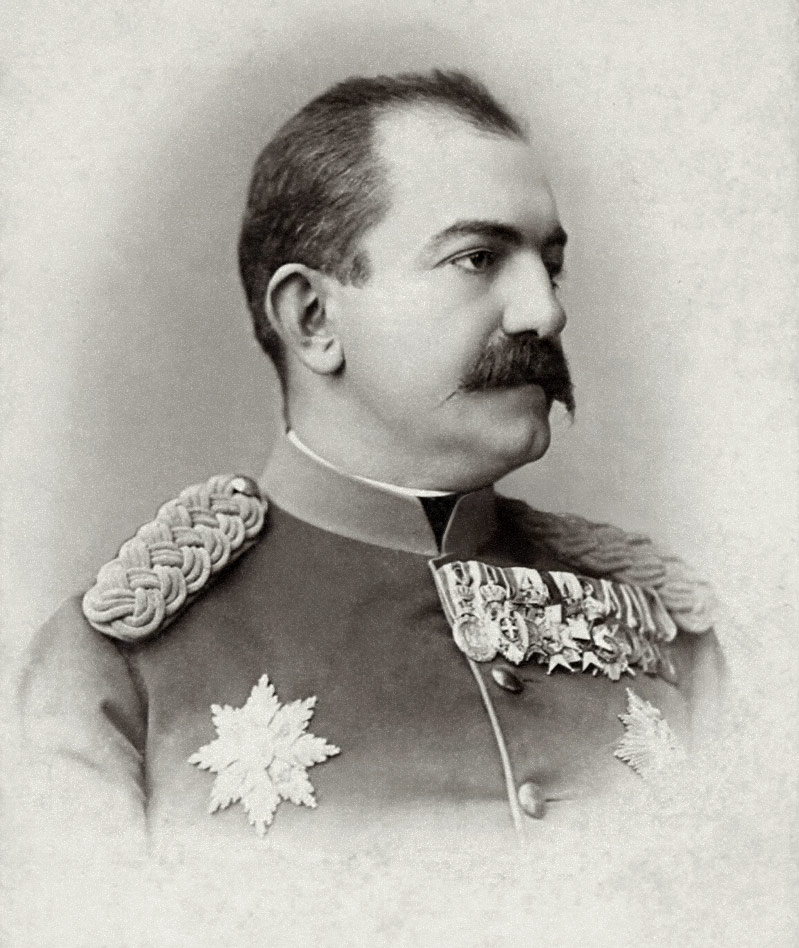

King of Serbia
- Reign: 6 March 1882 – 6 March 1889
- Predecessor: Himself as Prince of Serbia
- Successor: Alexander I
- Prime Ministers: See list: Milan Piroćanac; Nikola Hristić; Milutin Garašanin; Jovan Ristić; Sava Grujić; Kosta Protić; Milivoje Petrović Blaznavac; Aćim Čumić; Danilo Stefanović; Stevča Mihailović; Ljubomir Kaljević

Prince of Serbia
- Reign: 10 June 1868 – 6 March 1882
- Predecessor: Mihailo Obrenović III
- Successor: Himself as King of Serbia
- Born: 22 August 1854; Mărășești, Moldavia, Romania
- Died: 11 February 1901 (aged 46); Vienna, Austria-Hungary
- Burial: Krušedol Monastery, Serbia
- Spouse: Natalia Keșco
- Issue: Alexander I Prince Sergei; George Obrenovic (illegitimate)
- House: Obrenović
- Father: Miloš J. Obrenović
- Mother: Marija Obrenović
- Religion: Serbian Orthodox
- Military career
- Allegiance: Kingdom of Serbia
- Branch: Royal Serbian Army
- Service years: 1900–1901
- Rank: Army general

Styles of Milan I of Serbia
- Reference style: His Majesty
- Spoken style: Your Majesty

Milan Obrenović IV (Serbian Cyrillic: Милан Обреновић, romanized: Milan Obrenović; 22 August 1854 – 11 February 1901) reigned as the Prince of Serbia from 10 June 1868 until 1882, and then King of Serbia, a title he held until his abdication on 6 March 1889. Most important events during Milan's reign was the First and Second Serbian–Ottoman War and the Serbo-Bulgarian War. At the beginning of his reign, the Principality of Serbia was still de jure part of the Ottoman Empire, but became fully independent in 1878 with the Treaty of Berlin (1878). In 1882, the Principality was elevated to the status of a kingdom, and Milan became a king.

Milan abdicated the throne in 1889 and left Serbia, after which his son, Alexander I, became the second King of Serbia. After a few years, Milan returned to Serbia and in 1897 his son appointed him the commander-in-chief of the Royal Serbian Army. Milan did not approve his son's marriage to Queen Draga, so he left Serbia again in 1900 and died in exile in 1901.

== Early years ==
=== Birth and infancy in exile ===
Milan Obrenović was born in 1854 in Mărășești in Moldavia, where his family had lived in exile ever since the return of the rival House of Karađorđević to the Serbian throne in 1842 when they managed to depose Milan's cousin Prince Mihailo Obrenović III.

Milan was the son of Miloš Obrenović (1829–1860) and of his Moldavian wife Marija Obrenović, née Elena Maria Catargiu. Milan's paternal grandfather (Miloš's father) was Jevrem Obrenović (1790–1856), brother of Miloš Obrenović I, Prince of Serbia from 1815 to 1839 and from 1858 to 1860. Milan was therefore Prince Miloš's grandnephew. He had only one sibling — his older sister Tomanija.

In 1855, shortly after Milan's birth, his parents divorced. When Milan was aged 7, his father Miloš died on 20 November 1860 (or 1861) while fighting the Turks near Bucharest as a foreign mercenary in the Romanian Army, meaning that his mother Marija got legal custody. Marija, however, lived a lavish aristocratic lifestyle, soon becoming Romanian ruler Alexandru Ioan Cuza's mistress and bearing him two sons — Alexandru Al. Ioan Cuza (nicknamed Sașa) and Dimitrie. As a result, she showed little interest in her children from her previous marriage with Miloš. Therefore, an agreement was reached for young Milan to be legally adopted by his cousin Mihailo Obrenović, who in the meantime, following the 1858 expulsion of the House of Karađorđević, had returned to Serbia and had become the ruling prince in 1860.

=== Arriving in Serbia ===
Milan was brought to Kragujevac by Prince Mihailo Obrenović III who also arranged for a governess to raise the youngster. Decades later, once Milan became a king, details of his mother's personal life were often used by his political opponents, notably People's Radical Party (NRS) leader Stojan Protić who went as far as making an untrue accusation in his paper Samouprava that King Milan's father was actually Alexandru Ioan Cuza, referring to King Milan pejoratively as Kuzić instead of Obrenović.

After bringing his nephew to Serbia, Prince Mihailo also took care of the youngster's education, sending him to Lycée Louis-le-Grand in Paris where young Milan reportedly displayed considerable maturity.

== Prince of Serbia (1868–1882) ==
Portrait of Prince Milan by Stevan Todorović, 1881

On 10 June 1868, when Milan was only fourteen years of age, Prince Mihailo Obrenović III was assassinated. As the late prince did not have any male heirs, the question of who was to succeed him on the Serbian throne became a pressing one. In the post-assassination chaos and the resulting power vacuum, influential senior statesman Ilija Garašanin re-emerged in Serbian political life, despite only eight months earlier being removed by the late prince from the post of Prime Minister of Serbia and replaced with Jovan Ristić. While consolidating forces within the state to prevent the conspirators from taking over the power, Garašanin also reportedly contemplated solving the throne issue by starting a third royal dynasty. General political consensus was that the new ruler should be selected by the Visoka narodna skupština (Grand National Assembly). However, cabinet minister Milivoje Petrović Blaznavac was rapidly increasing his power and influence. He had managed to consolidate his control over the army and stage a coup d'état. So when Blaznavac suggested the young Milan as the successor to Prince Mihailo, Garašanin had no choice but to yield to the more powerful authority.

=== Regency of Milivoje Petrović Blaznavac ===
As Milan was still underage to rule on his own, a regency was established to rule in Milan's name. The three-man council was headed by Blaznavac. Statesman and historian Jovan Ristić and Jovan Gavrilović, a politician and historian from a wealthy merchant family rounded out the trio.

Young Milan was brought back to Serbia from Paris and enthroned in front of the Topčider assembly while the Blaznavac-controlled army surrounded the building just in case. Furthermore, a prominent Serb nobleman from Dubrovnik, Medo Pucić, was brought to Belgrade to serve as a teacher and adviser to the prince.

Under Blaznavac's tutelage, both personally and politically, the prince deferred to the head of the regency council in all matters of state. Prince Milan did not benefit from a large inheritance from his wealthy family as all of Prince Mihailo's vast property went to Mihailo's sisters (Prince Miloš's daughters) Petrija's and Savka's children. The only property young Prince Milan did inherit was his late father's compound in Mărășești that had an overwhelming amount of debt associated with it.

On 2 January 1869, the third Serbian constitution, mostly Ristić's creation, was promulgated.

In 1871, the prince faced two separate incidents although it is unclear as to whether these were genuine attempts on his life. In May as he exited the National Theatre building, a bomb exploded a couple of hundred metres away on Terazije. Buried under a footpath, the exploded device didn't cause anyone injuries. At the time and there was speculation in Serbia that it was Blaznavac who had organised the explosion in order to scare and confuse the young prince who was nearing his age of majority into remaining reliant on Blaznavac. The event became known as the Terazijska bomba (Terazije Bomb) in the Serbian historiography.

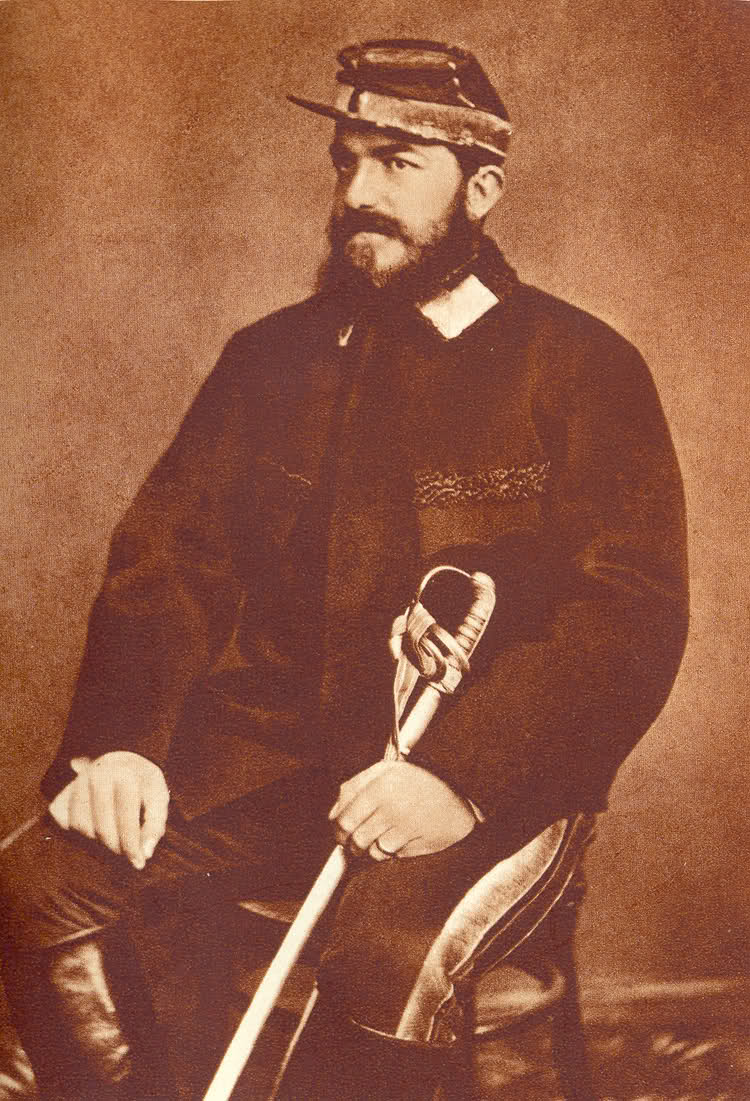
Milan Obrenovic IV in the uniform of the Serbian Army during the Serbian–Turkish Wars (1876–1878)

Several months later, on 6 October, Prince Milan was involved in another incident, this time during a visit to Smederevo. At some point, he went to an outhouse to relieve himself and while above the pit toilet, the wooden floor caved in under his weight and he fell into the pit. As he was armed at the time, the prince began shooting from his pistol in order get the attention of his entourage who rescued him. Historical accounts of the nature of this event differ. Historian Slobodan Jovanović thinks the occurrence was "likely coincidental". On the other hand, historian Leontije Pavlović in his book Smederevo u XIX veku (Smederevo in the Nineteenth Century) states the conspirators doused the wooden floor with nitric acid that ate away at the planks. However, these claims couldn't be confirmed as he based them on an item from the historical archives that has since disappeared. The entire episode is known as the Smederevski nameštaj (double meaning: The Smederevo Furniture or the Smederevo Setup).

=== Prince reaches the age of majority ===
On 22 August 1872, Milan was declared of age, and he took government into his own hands. Eugene Schuyler, who observed him about this time, found him to be a very remarkable, singularly intelligent and well-informed young man. The Principality of Serbia was still a de jure part of the Ottoman Empire though in reality it already had long functioned as a semi-independent state whose politics and economy was much more dependent on other Great Powers, particularly Austria-Hungary and the Russian Empire, than on its formal ruler, the declining Ottomans. Milan carefully maneuvred between the Austrian and Russian geopolitical interests in Serbia, with a judicious leaning towards the former.

When Serbs from the neighbouring Bosnia Vilayet (also part of the Ottoman Empire, though more integrated and loyal due to its large Muslim population) began an uprising in July 1875 on the outskirts of Nevesinje, protesting the tax system as well as harsh treatment under local beys and aghas, Prince Milan condemned the uprising and refused to take part in it. The rival House of Karađorđević, whose members lived in exile across Europe, had a different approach, taking part in organising and implementing the uprising. Their actions included the 31-year-old Petar Karađorđević going to the Herzegovina region in order to fight under the pseudonym Petar Mrkonjić. As the uprising grew, spreading to the rest of Herzegovina and soon engulfing the entire Bosnia Vilayet, domestic pressure in the Serbian principality increased on young Prince Milan to help his Serb brethren.

=== Marriage ===
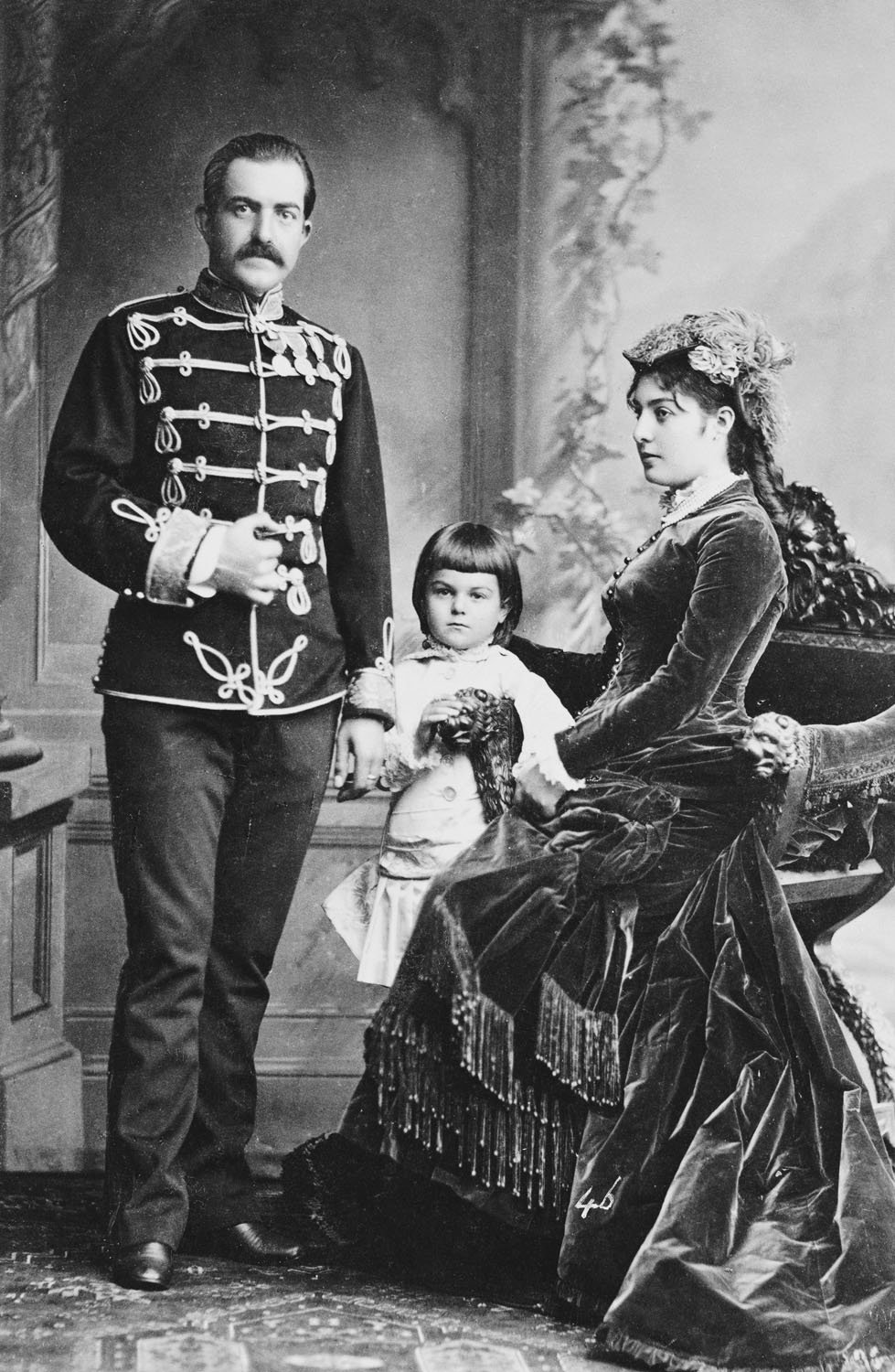
King Milan and Queen Natalie of Serbia with Prince Alexander

Milan married Natalie Keshko on 17 October [O.S. 5 October] 1875 at the St. Michael's Cathedral, Belgrade, Serbia. Natalie, sixteen years of age, was the daughter of Bessarabian nobleman Petre Ivanovich Keschko, who served as a colonel in Imperial Russian Army. Natalie's mother, Pulcheria, was by birth Princess Sturdza, meaning that the couple were fairly close second cousins because Milan's mother Elena and Natalie's father Petre were the children of two sisters, meaning that Milan and Natalija shared a set of great-grandparents. This relation meant that their marriage had to be specifically approved by the church, namely Metropolitan Mihailo Jovanović, the Metropolitan of Belgrade, however, this wasn't done.

A son, Alexander, was born to Natalija and Milan in 1876, but their relationship showed signs of friction right from the start.

=== Serbian–Ottoman Wars ===
It was under Milan's reign that the First Serbian–Ottoman War broke out, against his own personal preference, out of deference to public opinion. Meanwhile, the Karađorđević pretender, Peter, fought for the Serbs as a volunteer. The Serbian effort to invade Turkish territory was stopped to the east of Zaječar, while Turkish troops destroyed the strategic Serbian post of Knjaževac. Retreating Serbian troops were then defeated at Aleksinac. As the Serbian military situation became desperate Prince Milan asked for the Great Powers to intervene, and an armistice was granted by the Ottomans, but it fell apart in the wake of the Deligrad Event.

The resumed fighting went in favor of the Ottomans, and after the fall of Đunis, Ottoman troops began their march to Belgrade. It was at this point that the government of the Russian Empire intervened offering an ultimatum to the Porte to grant both Serbia and Montenegro an armistice within 48 hours or face Russian intervention. Such an armistice to last for two months was granted on November 1, 1876, and subsequently extended until March 1, 1877, when a definitive peace treaty was signed between the Ottoman Empire and the Kingdom of Serbia. The treaty preserved the status quo ante bellum. Serbia gained no territory, but was not forced to cede anything either or pay a war indemnity.

At the end of the Second Serbian–Ottoman War (1876–78), where Serbia was victorious, Europe's powers induced the Sublime Porte to acknowledge Serbian independence at the Treaty of Berlin.

== King of Serbia (1882–1889) ==
On 6 March 1882, the Principality of Serbia was declared a kingdom and Milan was proclaimed King of Serbia.

Acting under Austro-Hungarian influence, King Milan devoted all his energies to the improvement of the means of communication and the development of natural resources. However, the cost of this, unduly increased by reckless extravagance, led to disproportionately heavy taxation. This, coupled with increased military service, rendered King Milan and the Austrian party unpopular.

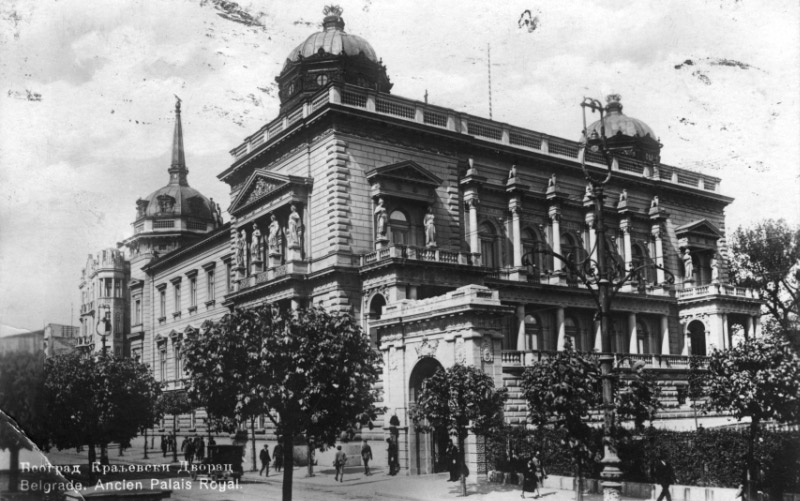
Stari dvor in Belgrade, built by Milan I

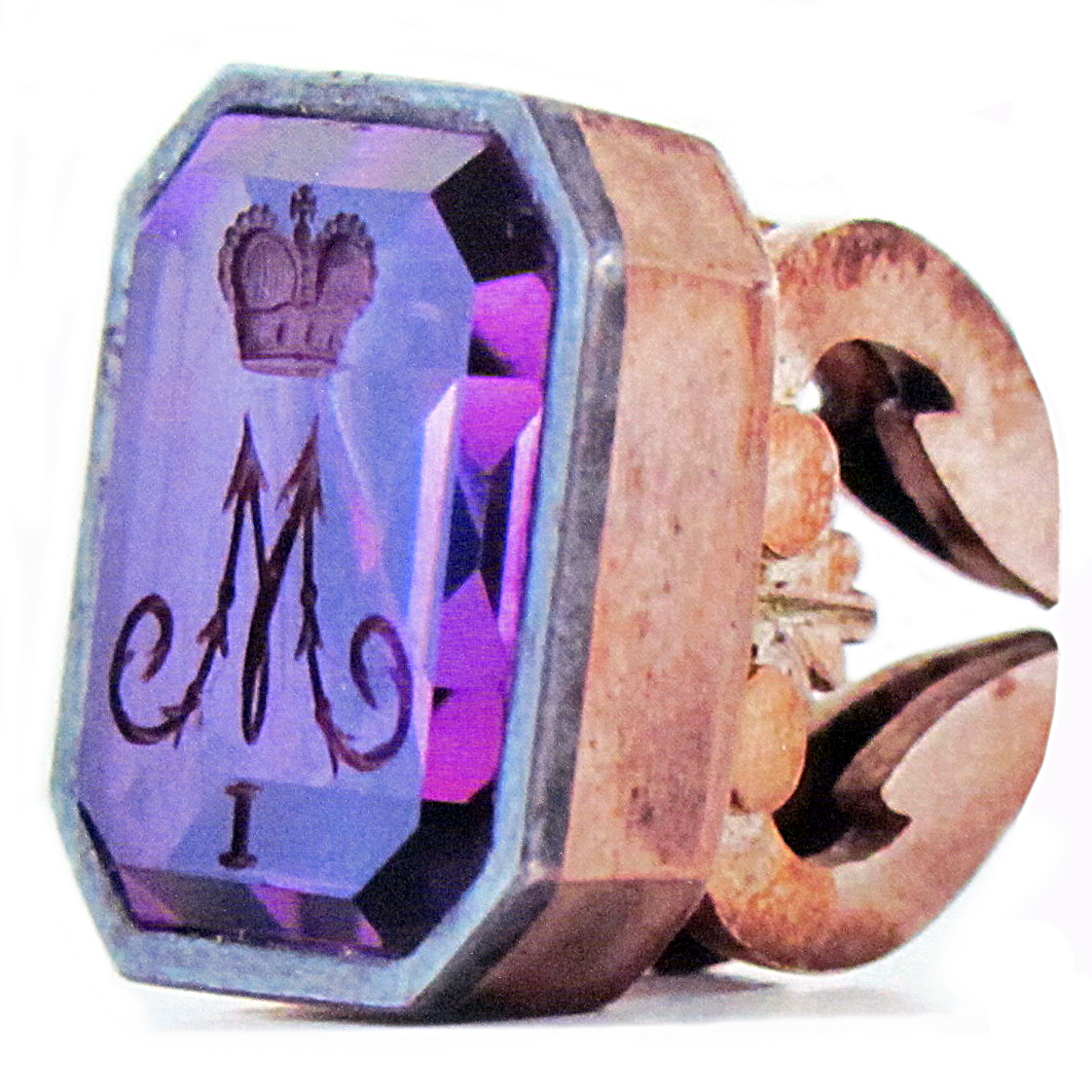
Seal of King Milan I

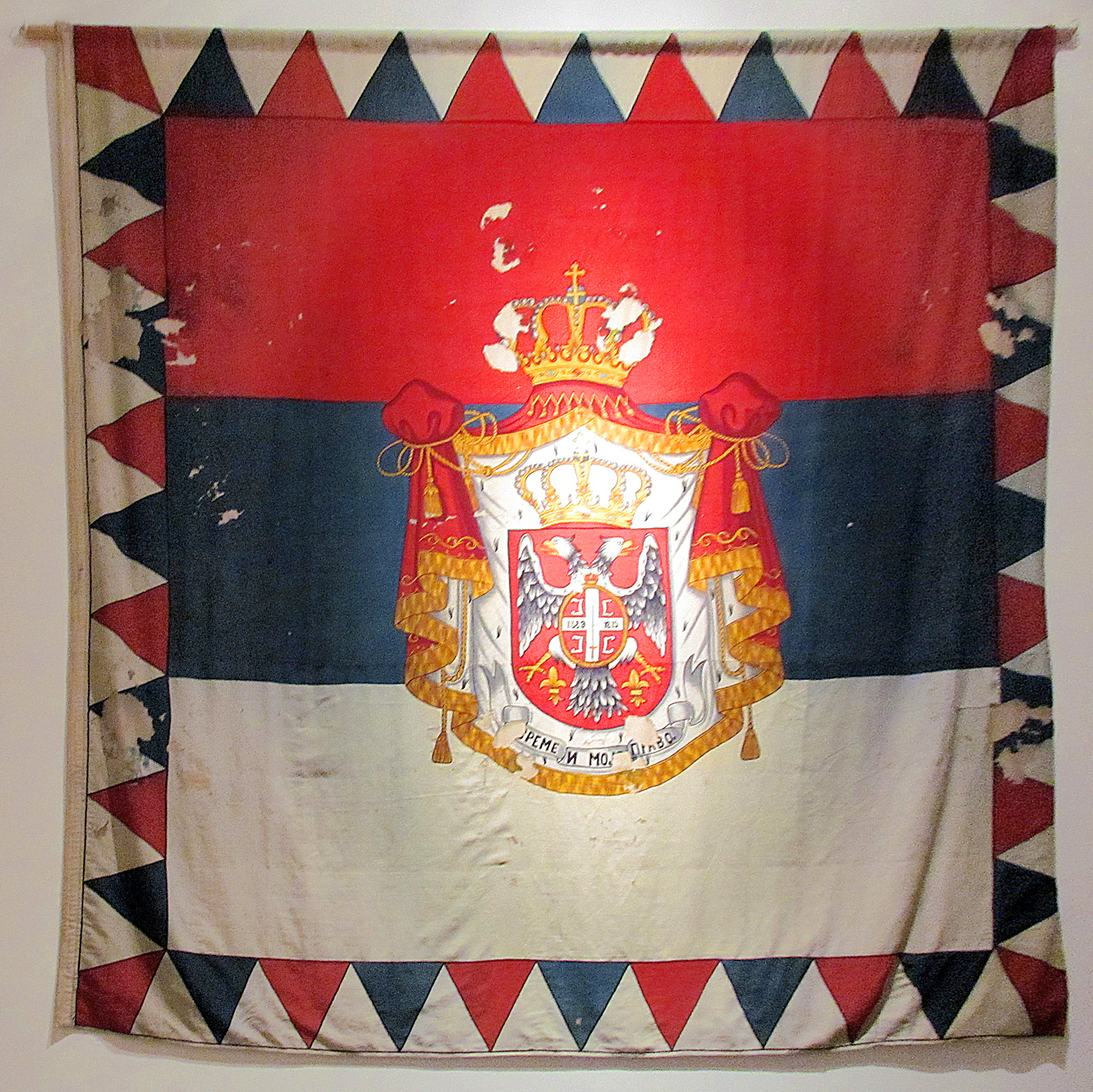
Standard of King Milan I

Milan's political troubles were further increased by the defeat of the Serbians in the war against Bulgaria in 1885–1886. In September 1885, the union of Eastern Rumelia and Bulgaria caused widespread agitation in Serbia. Milan promptly declared war upon the new Bulgarian state on 15 November. After a short, decisive campaign, the Serbs were utterly routed at the Battle of Slivnitsa and at the Battle of Pirot. Milan's throne was only saved by the direct intervention of Austria-Hungary. Domestic difficulties now arose which rapidly assumed political significance.

In his personal life, Milan was anything but a faithful husband, having an affair with most notably Jennie Jerome (wife of Lord Randolph Churchill and mother to Winston Churchill) among others, while Queen Natalija was greatly influenced by Russian sympathies. In 1886, the couple, mismatched both personally and politically, separated after eleven years of marriage.

Natalija withdrew from the kingdom, taking with her the ten-year-old Prince Alexander (later King Alexander I). While she was residing at Wiesbaden in 1888, King Milan succeeded in recovering the crown prince, whom he undertook to educate. In reply to the queen's remonstrances, Milan exerted considerable pressure upon the Metropolitan of Belgrade, and procured a divorce, which was afterwards annulled as illegal. King Milan now seemed master of the situation.

On 3 January 1889, Milan adopted a new constitution much more liberal than the existing one of 1869. Two months later, on 6 March, thirty-four-year-old Milan suddenly abdicated the throne, handing it over to his twelve-year-old son. No satisfactory reason was assigned for this step. Milan settled in Paris as a private individual.

In 2020, a number of letters written in French by King Milan were discovered. In the letters, Milan advised his son how to rule and gave critical comments on political figures of his time, such as PM Nikola Pašić.

== Post-monarchical role ==
In February 1891, a Radical ministry was formed. Queen Natalija and the ex-Metropolitan Mihailo returned to Belgrade, and Austrian influence began to give way to Russian. Fear of a revolution and King Milan's return led to a compromise, by which, in May 1891, the queen was expelled, and Milan was allowed a million francs from the civil list, on condition of not returning to Serbia during his son's minority.

In March 1892, Milan renounced all his rights and even his Serbian nationality. The situation altered dramatically, however, after the young Alexander I had effected his coup d'etat and taken the government into his own hands in April 1893. Serbian politics began to grow more complicated, and Russian influence was rife. In January 1894, Milan suddenly appeared in Belgrade, and his son gladly welcomed his experience and advice.

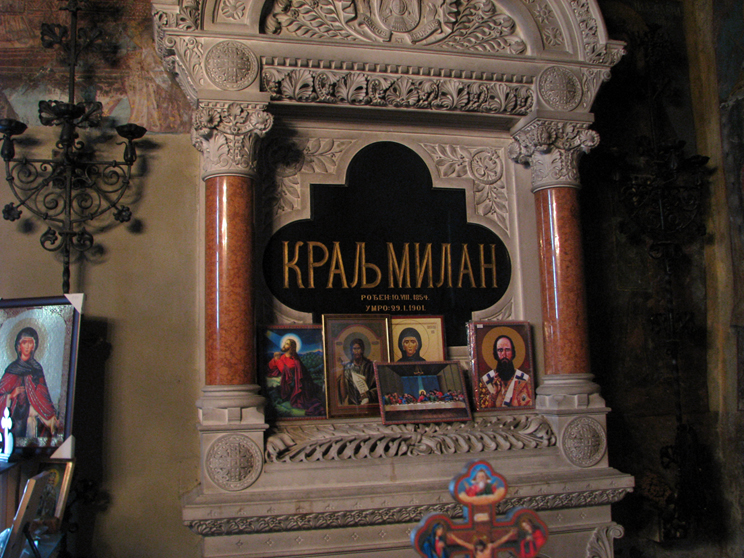
Tomb of Milan I, at Krušedol monastery

On 29 April, a royal decree reinstated Milan and Natalija, who in the meantime had become ostensibly reconciled, in their positions as members of the royal family. On 21 May, the constitution of 1869 was restored, and Milan continued to exercise considerable influence over his son. The queen, who had been residing chiefly at Biarritz, returned to Belgrade in May 1895, after four years of absence, and was greeted by the populace with great enthusiasm. At this, the ex-king Milan again left the country.

After reconciliation with his son, Milan returned to Serbia in 1897, to be appointed as commander-in-chief of the Royal Serbian Army. In this capacity, he did some of the best work of his life, and his success in improving the Serbian military system was very marked. His relations with the young king also remained good for a time. The Serbian pro-Democratic opposition blamed him for the increasingly authoritarian rule of the young King, and a member of the Radical Party attempted to kill him on 6 July [O.S. 24 June] 1899, on the Orthodox holiday of Ivanjdan.

The good relations between father and son were interrupted, however, by the latter's marriage to Draga Mašin in July 1900. Milan opposed the match to the point that he resigned his post as commander-in-chief. Alexander subsequently banished Milan from Serbia. Milan left Serbia to Karlsbad, then to Timișoara and finally retired to Vienna. On 11 February 1901, Milan died unexpectedly. He was buried in Krušedol monastery, next to his grandaunt Princess Ljubica, Prince Miloš's wife.

== Honours ==
He received the following orders and decorations:

- Order of the Cross of Takovo, Serbia
- Order of the Cross of Takovo, with Swords, Serbia
- Order of the White Eagle, Serbia
- Order of St. Sava, Serbia
- Military Merit medal, Serbia
- Commemorative medal of the Serbo-Bulgarian War, Serbia
- Order of St. Andrew, Russia
- Order of St. Stanislaus, Russia
- Order of St. Alexander Nevsky, Russia
- Order of St. Anna, Russia
- Imperial Order of the White Eagle, Russia
- Order of St. George, Russia
- Order of the Seraphim, Sweden
- Order of Saints Maurice and Lazarus, Italy
- Legion of Honour, France
- Royal Order of Kalākaua, Kingdom of Hawaii
- Royal Order of Kamehameha I, Kingdom of Hawaii
- Order of Albert the Bear, Duchy of Anhalt
- Order of St. Stephen, Austria-Hungary
- Order of Franz Joseph, Austria-Hungary
- Imperial Order of Leopold, Austria-Hungary
- Order of St. Hubert, Kingdom of Bavaria
- Order of Leopold, Belgium
- Order of Henry the Lion, Duchy of Brunswick
- Order of St. Alexander, Kingdom of Bulgaria
- Order of Military Merit
- Order of the Elephant, Denmark
- Ludwig Order, Grand Duchy of Hesse
- Order of the Redeemer, Kingdom of Greece
- House Order of the Wendish Crown, Grand Duchy of Mecklenburg-Schwerin
- Order of St. Charles, Monaco
- Order of Prince Danilo I, Principality of Montenegro
- Order of the Netherlands Lion, Netherlands
- House and Merit Order of Peter Frederick Louis, Grand Duchy of Oldenburg
- Order of the Lion and the Sun, Persian Empire
- Sash of the Two Orders, Kingdom of Portugal
- Order of the Black Eagle, Kingdom of Prussia
- Order of the Red Eagle, Kingdom of Prussia
- Order of the Star of Romania, Kingdom of Romania
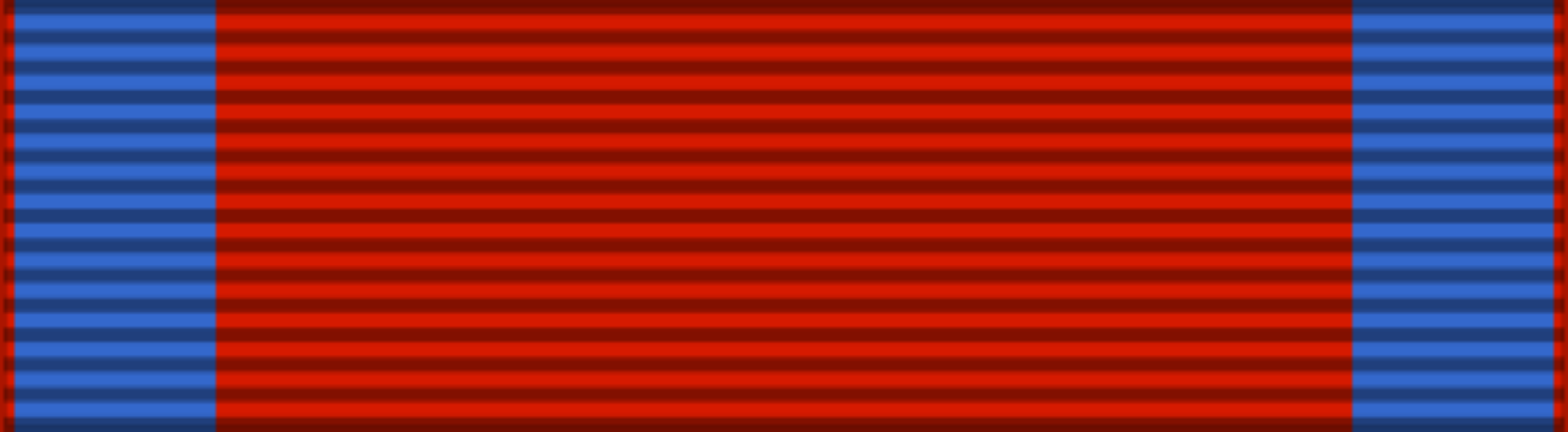
- Ribbon for Military Virtue of Romania, Kingdom of Romania
- Saxe-Ernestine House Order, Saxe-Meiningen
- Order of the White Falcon, Saxe-Weimar-Eisenach
- Order of the Rue Crown, Kingdom of Saxony
- Order of Charles III, Spain
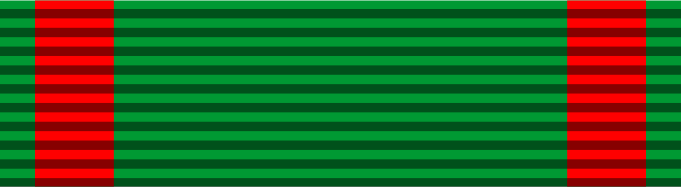
- Order of Osmanieh, Ottoman Empire
- Order of the Württemberg Crown, Württemberg
- Order of the Orthodox Church of Jerusalem

== In popular culture ==
- In 1983 film Timok Rebellion, Milan I was portrayed by actor Danilo Lazović.
- In 1995 TV miniseries The End of Obrenović Dynasty, Milan I was portrayed by actor Aleksandar Berček.
- In 2003 TV film Ilka, Milan I was portrayed by actor Ljubomir Bandović.
- In 2008 TV miniseries The Last Audience, Milan I was portrayed by actor Boris Milojević.
- Albatross, a television film based on the biography of Milan I and directed by Filip Cholovitch, was produced in 2011 by the Serbian broadcasting service RTS.

== Sources ==
- ; the original source for the text of this article
- Armour, Ian D. (2013). ""Like the Lord Lieutenant of a county": the Habsburg monarchy and Milan Obrenović of Serbia 1868–1881". Canadian Slavonic Papers. 55 (3–4): 305–342.
- Armour, Ian D. (2014). ""Put Not Your Trust in Princes": The Habsburg Monarchy and Milan Obrenović of Serbia 1881–1885". Canadian Slavonic Papers. 56 (3–4): 201–237.
- Baranin, Dušan (1977). Milan Obrenović: kralj Srbije. V. Karadžić.
- Jovanović, Slobodan (1927). Vlada Milana Obrenovića: 1878-1889. Izdavačka knjižarnica Gece Kona.
- Nikolajević, Dušan S. (1927). Kralj Milan i Timočka buna. Narodna misao.
- Rastović, Aleksandar (2000). Велика Британија и Србија (1878-1889) [Great Britain and Serbia (1878-1889)]. Istorijski institut. ISBN 978-86-355-0463-6.
- Sretenović, Vukadin (1990). Kralj Milan. NIGP "Glas".
- Terzić, Predrag (2018). "King Milan Obrenović: Among the Political Elite, the Masses and Great Powers". Serbian Political Thought. 18 (2): 141–159.
- Trivanovitch, Vaso (1931). "Serbia, Russia, and Austria during the Rule of Milan Obrenovich, 1868-78". Journal of Modern History. 3 (3): 414–440. Online
- Ward, A.W.; Prothero, G.W.; Leathes, Stanely, eds. (1920). The Cambridge Modern History. Vol. 12. Cambridge University Press.

Milan I of Serbia Obrenović dynasty Born: 22 August 1854 Died: 11 February 1901
Regnal titles
Preceded by Mihailo Obrenović III	Prince of Serbia; 10 June 1868 – 6 March 1882	Became king
New title	King of Serbia; 6 March 1882 – 6 March 1889	Succeeded by Alexander I
