= Miloševac =

Miloševac may refer to:

- Miloševac (Šabac), a village in Serbia
- Miloševac (Velika Plana), a village in Serbia
- Miloševac, Modriča, a village in Bosnia and Herzegovina
- Miloševac, Barilović, a village in Serbia
