= Obrad Stanojević =

Law professor at the University of Belgrade

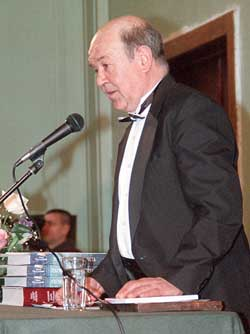
Obrad Stanojević, emeritus professor of law

Obrad Stanojević (Serbian Cyrillic: Обрад Станојевић; March 28, 1934 – November 23, 2011) was an emeritus professor and former dean of the University of Belgrade's Law School, Serbia. He was a renowned expert in Roman law, comparative law, civil law and international law, and has written extensively in these fields. Stanojević was a member of the international advisory board of the Loyola University New Orleans College of Law and has been associated with this law school since 1990, when he visited it as a Fulbright Scholar. He has also taught at the Loyola College of Law as a visiting professor from 1994 to 1996, and he has taught in Loyola's summer programs in Hungary, Mexico, and Russia. He has lectured widely at leading European universities. Together with Professor Sima Avramović, he was the organizer of the prestigious Belgrade Competition in Oratory. Additionally, Stanojević was the only representative from Eastern Europe of the international review Revue internationale des droits de l’Antiquité – Brussels.

== Early life ==
Stanojević was born on March 28, 1934, in Mustapić, Serbia, to father Rev. Slobodan Stanojević (July 22, 1910 – July 19, 1942) and mother Nadežda (Nada) Stanojević (née Marković, b. Sep. 30, 1910 - d. October 30, 2007.). At the time Rev. Slobodan Stanojević was temporarily stationed in Mustapić to perform his first service as a priest of Serbian Orthodox Church. Both parents are by origin from the city of Prokuplje, Serbia where they later continued to live. Stanojević attended elementary school in Prokuplje, where he stayed during German occupation in World War II. Upon arrival of German army, Rev. Slobodan Stanojević became one of the local leaders (Vojvoda) of the Serbian Loyalist movement - Četniks, which successfully organized armed resistance against German troops during occupation. Rev. Slobodan Stanojevic was betrayed by his neighbour, and was assassinated in his home by communist militia on the night of July 19, 1942. Nada and Stanojević remained in Prokuplje until summer of 1947, when they moved to Belgrade. In Belgrade they lived in Dorćol district in Cara Urosa 31 street, where Stanojević attended the First Gymnasium middle school (Prva Muška Gimnazija).

== Professional career ==
Following his interest in sciences and social studies, Stanojević enrolled University of Belgrade School of Law in 1953, where he obtained LL.B. degree in 1957. After graduation Stanojević became a postgraduate student at the Department of Classical Philology (Greek and Latin) of Belgrade University. He also spent several years studying abroad at Institut Universitaire des Etudes Europeennes (Turin, Italy 1960/61) and Institute of Comparative Law, New York University (1964/65). Stanojević obtained his Ph.D. degree in 1964 with the thesis: “Loan and interest, Historical and Comparative Study”. By this time he became fluent in several foreign languages: English, French, Italian, Russian (in all those languages he delivered lectures), with passive knowledge of Latin, Spanish and German.

Stanojević devoted most of his career teaching Roman law and history of law at Belgrade University School of Law, where he was appointed first associate professor of law and later full professor. He also served as associate dean (1980–82) and dean (1991–92). During his professional career Stanojević became one of the world's leading scholars in Roman law and lectured extensively around the globe. He also authored numerous scholarly articles and books that were translated in several languages. He retired from teaching at Belgrade University Law School in 1998, but remained active in the “Forum Romanum” Club, as a chief organizer of the annual student contest in rhetorics. Stanojević also continued extensive teaching activities as a guest lecturer at other universities in the region and around the world.

=== University career summary ===
- Assistant Professor of Law
- Associate Professor of Law
- Full Professor of Law
- Associate Dean (1980–82) and Dean (1991-1993) of the University of Belgrade Law School
- President of the Department for Legal History at the Law School of Belgrade (for more than ten years)
- Founder and President of the Club “Forum Romanum” of the Law School
- President and member of the National Council for Higher Education
- President of the society Dante Alighieri (International association for the promotion of Italian language and culture)
- Vice-president of the Societa' degli amici dell’Universita' per stranieri di Perugia.

=== Lecturing activity ===
- At the University of Belgrade Law School: Roman Law, Rhetoric, Major Legal Systems;
- University of Kragujevac Law School, Serbia History of Political and Legal Institutions
- Loyola University Law School, New Orleans, USA:, Roman Law, Comparative Law, Western Legal Traditions, Property, Family Law and Public International Law.
- At the Center for European studies (together with the University of Nancy, France): History of Europe and European Idea
- at the Summer programs of Loyola: Comparative Law, International Law and Russia
- Summer program of the Law School of Tulane (New Orleans) Countries in transition – example of Yugoslavia.
- Lecturer at the University of London (1985), Edinburgh (1985), Milan (1986), Pisa (1986, 1996), Brussels (1989), Moscow (1989).
- Visiting professor (Fulbright program) at Loyola University, School of Law in New Orleans (1990)
- Professor at Loyola by contract from 1993 to 1995
- Associate director (on two occasions) and professor at the Summer School of Loyola in Mexico (1992, 1995, 1998, 2005, 2006, 2007, 2008, 2009)
- Professor at Loyola summer programs in Moscow and Budapest (1993, 1994, 1996, 2001)
- At the Summer School of Tulane Law School in Greece (1999)
- At the joint summer program of Loyola (New Orleans) and Touro (New York) from 2000 to 2004
- Distinguished Visiting Professor by Loyola University School of Law (March - April 2001)

=== Awards ===
- “Premio Internazionale Vincenzo Arangio-Ruiz” (Naples, 1968) for the book “Loan and Interest (Historical and Comparative Study”)
- Award “The Book of the Year in Legal Literature”, Belgrade, 1986 for the textbook “Roman law”
- The same award for the book “Ars Rhetorica” for year 2002
- Member of Accademia Costantiniana (Perugia, Italy)
- At the first voting of Student Radio Index, “Choosing the most popular professor of Belgrade University” in 1986 won the first place.
- The series “Academia in vivo” (transmitting lectures from Belgrade University on TV has started with Stanojević's lecture “Law and Civilization of Ancient Egypt”.

=== Major publications ===
1. Loan and interest, Historical and Comparative Study, Belgrade, 1966, 325 p.
2. Gaius noster – contribution to the History of Roman Jurisprudence, Belgrade, 1976, 188 p.
3. Latin for Law Students, Belgrade, 1982, 238 p. (several editions)
4. Institutes of Gaius, Latin text, translation and comment, Belgrade, 1982, 330 p. Second edition 2009
5. Roman Law (textbook), Belgrade, 1986 (and twenty five consecutive editions) 460 p.
6. Basic Principles of Common Law, Belgrade, 44 p.
7. Gaius noster – plaidoyer pour Gaius, Amsterdam, 1989, 184 p. (in French)
8. History of Political and Legal Institutions (part I: Near East and Greece), Belgrade, 1988, 120 p.
9. One Hundred and Fifty Years of Law School (1841-1991), Editor-in-chief and author of the first chapter (Licej u Kragujevcu), Beograd, 1991, p. 1 - 28
10. O. Stanojevic & Sima Avramovic, Basic Principles of Rhetoric, Belgrade, 1993, 182 p.
11. Obrad Stanojevic & Sima Avramovic, Ars Rhetorica – Manual of Rhetoric, Belgrade, 2002, 550 p. (second ed. 2003)
12. History of European Civilization and European Idea (lecture notes), Belgrade, 1996, 142 p.
13. Eastern European Countries in Transition, example of Yugoslavia (lecture notes), 2001. 231 p.
14. International Law and Russia (lecture notes) 2003, 327 p.
15. Obrad Stanojevic & Jelena Danilovic Tekstovi iz Rimskog prava (praktikum za vezbe) several editions, 275 p.
16. Western Legal Tradition, Lecture material for the Summer School of Loyola University in Mexico, Cuernavaca

=== Encyclopedias ===
1. Enciclopedia dei popoli d’Europa, Firenze, 1969 (contributions dealing with Yugoslav cultural, political and legal history)
2. Encyclopedia of Private Law, Belgrade, 1981
3. One of seven main redactors of Serbian Encyclopedia by Serbian Academy of Sciences and Matica Srpska (covering: political sciences, law, sociology, economy, trade and commerce – in preparation). Now one of 31 redactors covering Law and Political sciences.

=== Selected articles ===
1. O nekim problemima ugovora o zajmu u na_em gradjanskom pravu, Arhiv za pravne i dru_tvene nauka, 1964, str. 205 – 215
2. O nastanku zajma i kamata, Zbornik posve_en Albertu Vajsu, 1966, str. 103-110
3. Quis erat Gaius ? Anali Pravnog fakulteta u Beogradu, 1970, br. 1, str. 82 - 93
4. Quelques observations sur le pret dans les droits primitifs, Studi Volterra, Naples 1970
5. Arbeiten an die Kodifizierung des Burgerliches Rechts in Jugoslawiens, Ost-Europa Recht, 1970
6. Zajam u Skici za zakonik o obligacijama prof. Mihaila Konstantinovica, 1972, br. 1-3, str. 509 - 525
7. Rimsko i anglosaksonsko shvatanje svojine, Anali Pravnog fakulteta, 1972, br. 5 - 6, str. 843 – 857
8. "Gaius noster" o imenu pisca najstarijeg udzbenika prava, Anali Pravnog fakulteta, 1973, br- 6, str. 59-66
9. Rerum cottidianarum sive aurerum libri VII. 1983, 1-4, p. 639-652
10. Da Spartaco ad Augusto, Atti dell’Academia Costantiniana, Perugia, 1986, p. 364-371
11. Gaius et les Romanistes, Studi Guarino, 1987
12. La protezione dei poveri: influsso del cristianesimo o politica antifeodale? Atti dell’Accademia Romanistica Costantiniana, VII, 1989, p. 495-500
13. Laesio enormis e colonato tardo-romano, Atti dell’Accademia Romanistica Costantiniana, VIII, 1990, p. 217 –226
14. Roman Law and Common Law – a different Point of View, Loyola Law Review, 1990, br. 2, p. 269 - 274
15. Gaius and Pomponius – Notes on David Pugsley, Revue internationale des droits de l’Antiquité, p. 333-356

=== Congresses ===
- Congress Le Droit pharaonique, Bruxelles, 1982
- Da Roma a terza Roma, Rome, 1986, Moscow, 1996 and Novi Sad, 2003
- More than ten congresses of the Societé internationale de l’histoire des droits de l’Antiquité (Trieste, Bruxelles (twice), Amsterdam (twice), Perpignan, Padova, New Orleans, Madrid, Exeter, Namur, Kavala - Greece). On most of those with a communication. At least six, president of the session. At the last one on which participated in Exeter, the president of the Séance de clôture. This Societé is publishing the famous journal Revue internationale de droit de l’Antiquité on which Stanojević was the member of the Comité scientifique (the only one from Central and Eastern Europe)
- On three occasions, twice with a communication at the sessions of the Accademia Costantiniana di Perugia.

=== Publishing activity ===
- Director of the Center for Publication of the Law School
- One of the three editors of the book edition ‘’Nomos’’ (Nolit)
- Member of the editorial board for the edition Prominent Law Scholars in Yugoslavia (Sluzbeni list)

==== Publications on the University reform ====
- University Reform as Aporia, (Gledišta)
- Law Studies in USA, (Anali Pravnog fakulteta)

=== Law practice ===
President of the Court of Chamber of Commerce (Sud Časti) of Belgrade (1978–1980).

=== Activity in rhetorics and debate ===
- As the dean of law school introduced a contest for students in rhetoric in 1993. Since that year it has become a tradition of the Law School, except in the period of political oppression 1998-2000. He also recommended to other Law Schools in the region to organize the same kind of student competition (which most of them accepted).
- During his deanship the course of Rhetoric was added to the curriculum of the Law School.
- Thrice the judge in the Moot Court competitions at Loyola of New Orleans.
- Twice the judge in the Philip Jessup competition (Tulane Law School, 1995, Loyola 2003).
- Director of the Center for Rhetoric (Institutio Oratoria) at the Law School of Belgrade University, which is organizing competition in Rhetoric each year (the most important such event in Serbia).

=== Other professional activities ===
- Member of the Conseil scientifique of the Revue internationale de droit de l’Antiquité, Brussels- RIDA
- Referee for scholarships offered by NYU (New York) for some time, now for Summer Programs of Aegean Institute (Rhodes) and Tulane Law School (New Orleans) held on the Islands of Rhodes (Rhodos) and Spetses (Greece).
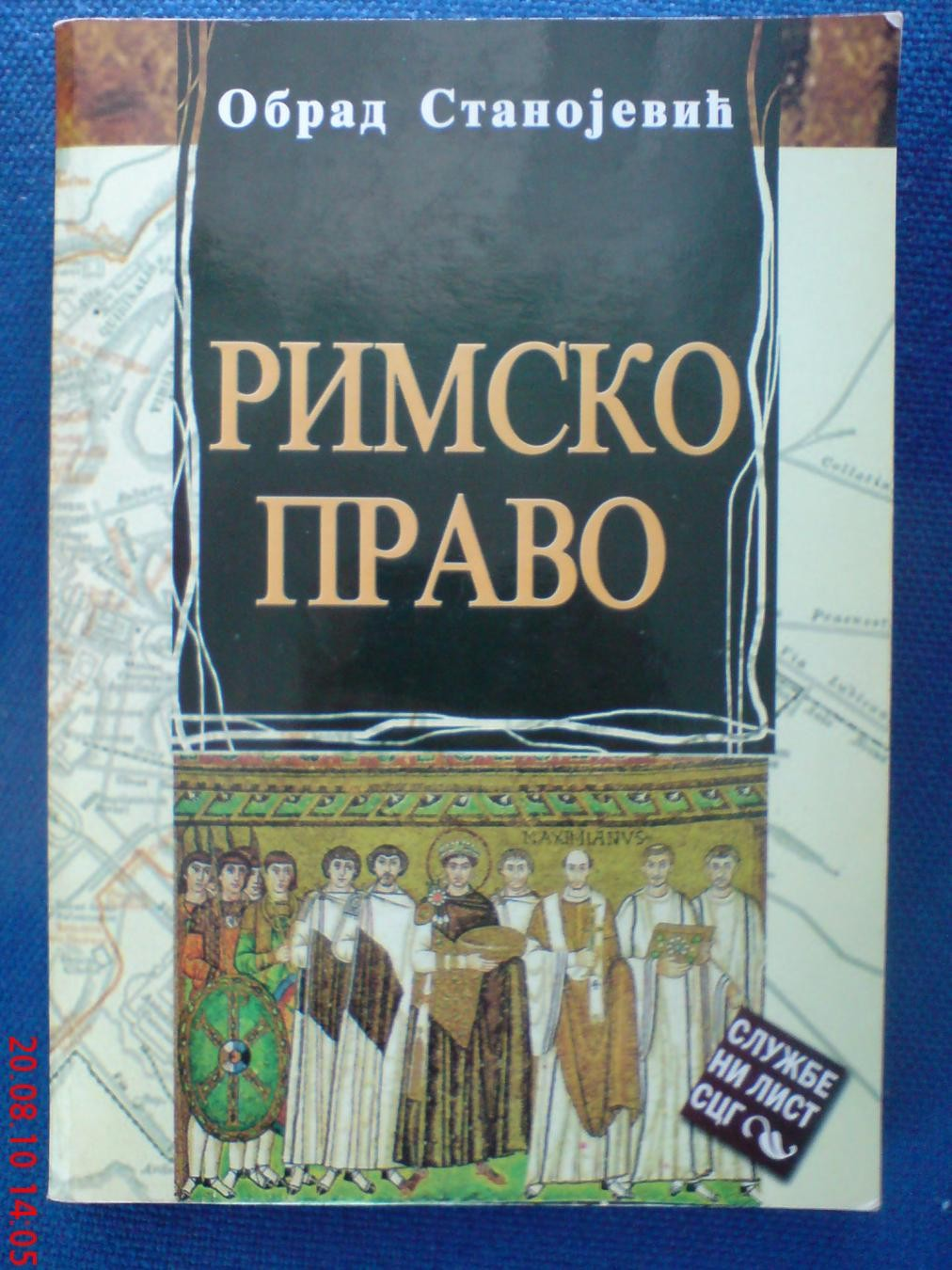
Obrad Stanojevic, Roman Law

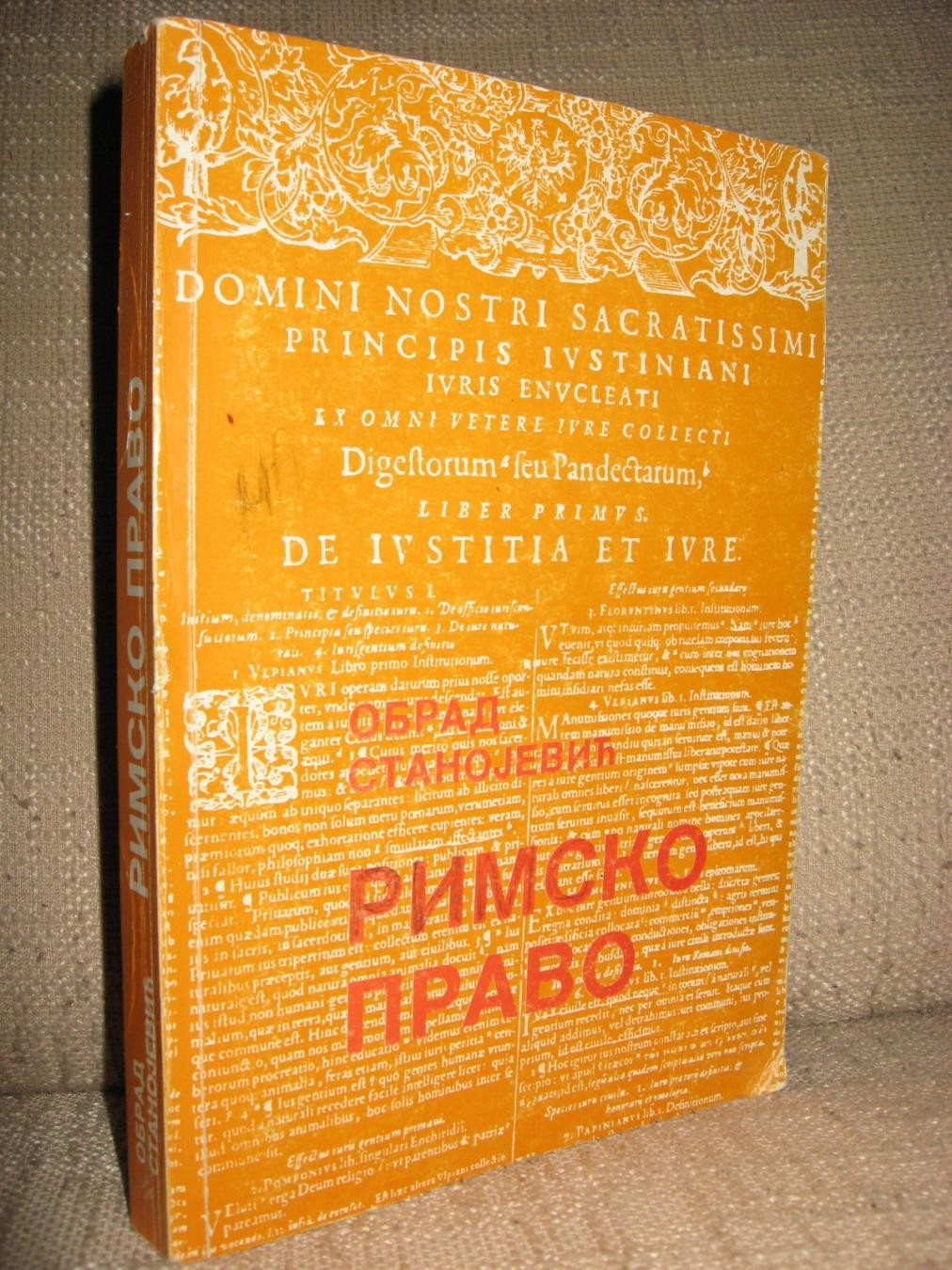
Obrad Stanojevic, Roman Law

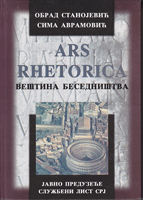
Obrad Stanojevic and Sima Avramovic, Ars Rhetorica

== Books ==
- Loan and Interest: Historical and Comparative Study, Belgrade (1966)
- Gaius Noster – Contribution to the History of Roman Jurisprudence, Belgrade (1976)
- Latin for Law Students, Belgrade (1982)
- Institutes of Gaius, Latin text, translation and comment, Belgrade (1982)
- Textbook on Roman Law, Belgrade (1986) (twelve consecutive editions)
- Basic Principles of Common Law, Belgrade
- Gaius noster – plaidoyer pour Gaius, Amsterdam (1989) (in French)
- History of Political and Legal Institutions (part I: Near East and Greece), Belgrade (1988)
- The Basic Principles of Rhetoric (together with Sima Avramović), Belgrade (1993)

== See also ==
- Belgrade Competition in Oratory
- Belgrade Law School
- Gabor Hamza: Obrad Stanojevic: Gaius noster. Plaidoyer pour Gaius. Amsterdam 1989. Acta Facultatis Politico-iuridicae Universitatis Scientiarum Budapestinensis de Rolando Eötvös nominatae 34 (1993–94) 125-127. p.
