= Trnovče (Velika Plana) =

Trnovče Трновче
- Village (Selo)
- Location within Serbia
- Coordinates: 44°24′39″N 21°06′21″E
- Country: Serbia
- District: Podunavlje District
- Municipality: Velika Plana

Population (2002)
  - Total: 1,060
- Time zone: UTC+1 (CET)
  - Summer (DST): UTC+2 (CEST)

Trnovče is a village in the municipality of Velika Plana, Serbia. According to the 2002 census, the village has a population of 1060 people.
