= Radomir Lukić =

Serbian jurist (1914–1999)

Radomir Lukić (Serbian: Радомир Лукић; August 31, 1914 – May 31, 1999) was a prolific Serbian jurist, a scholar of philosophy and sociology of law. He was born in Miloševac near Velika Plana, Serbia, where he was also buried.

== Biography ==
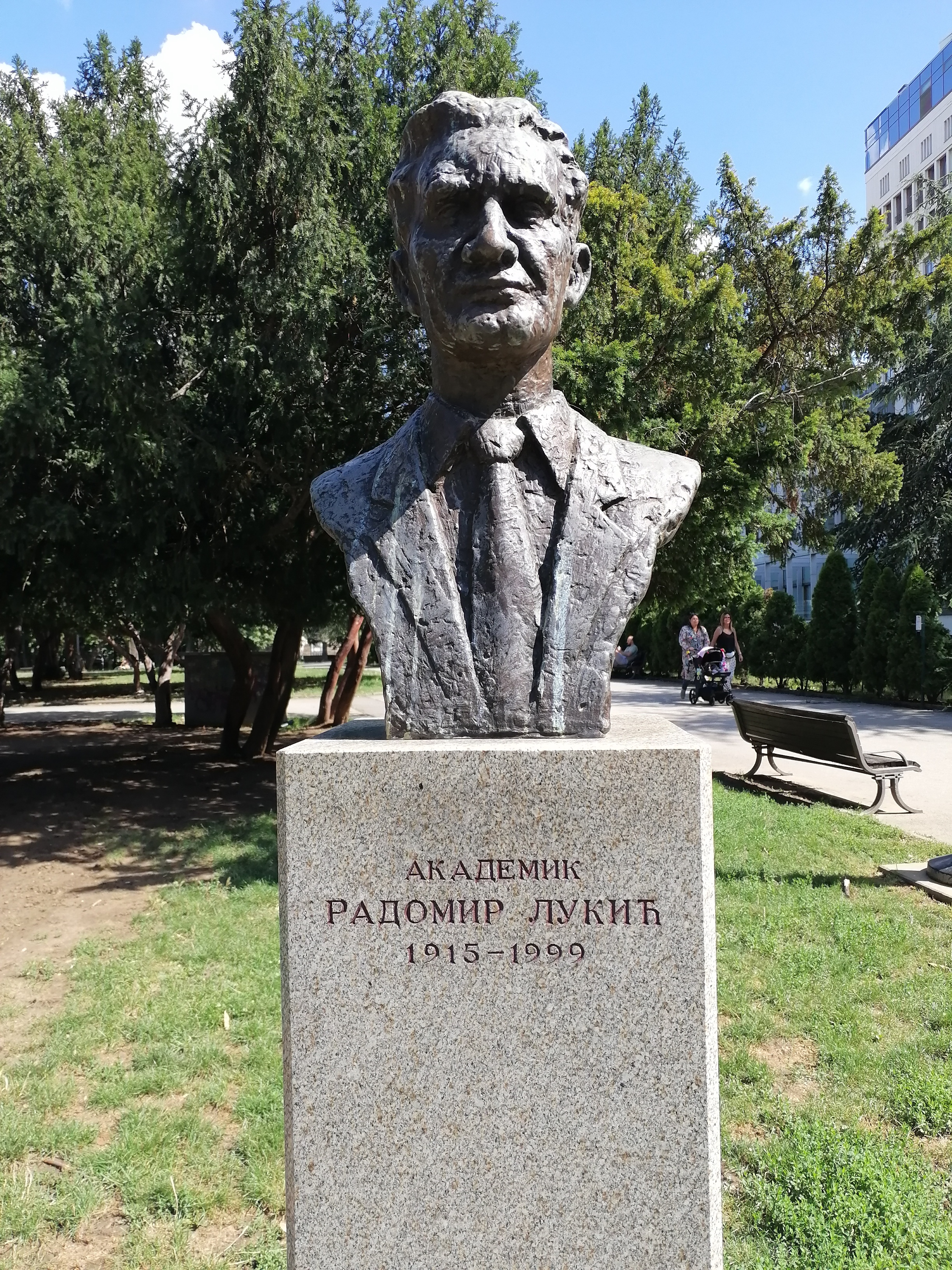

His parents died when he was very young and he had a difficult childhood. Lukić graduated from the University of Belgrade's Law School in 1933 as an excellent student and received a Ph.D. degree in Paris in 1939. He became a professor of law at the University of Belgrade Faculty of Law at the unusually early age of 26, and between 1958 and 1960 was the dean of the Faculty of Law.

He taught a number of important courses, including Theory of State and Law, Philosophy of Law, General Sociology and Methodology of Jurisprudence. He was a visiting lecturer at Grenoble, Paris, Nice, Warsaw, Moscow and Köln.

Lukić is known for writing the first textbook on sociology in the former Yugoslavia.

The University of Belgrade Faculty of Law named its main lecture hall in his memory, and established the Radomir Lukić Foundation in honor of his scholarship. There is a monument to him (metal bust on a stonework parapet/pedestal) in front of the Municipal Courthouse of Velika Plana.

In November 2026, a collection of his previously unpublished selected poems was published by the Belgrade-based publishing house Dosije Studio. The manuscripts, comprising a total of 179 poems written between 1927 and 1982, were discovered by his grandson in 2025 and subsequently transcribed.
