= Velibor Stanojlović =

Serbian politician

Velibor Stanojlović (Serbian Cyrillic: Велибор Станојловић; born 28 May 1987) is a politician in Serbia. He has served in the National Assembly of Serbia since 2020 as a member of the Serbian Progressive Party.

== Early life and career ==
Stanojlović was born in Velika Plana, in what was then the Socialist Republic of Serbia in the Socialist Federal Republic of Yugoslavia. He is an electrical engineer and president of the hunting association Pomoravlje-Plana.

== Politician ==
=== Municipal politics ===
Stanojlović received the twenty-second position on the Progressive Party's electoral list for the Velika Plana municipal assembly in the 2016 Serbian local elections and was elected when the list won a majority victory with exactly twenty-two of thirty-nine mandates. He was promoted to the fourteenth position on the party's list for the 2020 local elections and was re-elected when the list won twenty-eight mandates.

=== Parliamentarian ===
Stanojlović received the 186th position on the Progressive Party's Aleksandar Vučić — For Our Children list for the 2020 Serbian parliamentary election and was elected when the list won a landslide majority with 188 out of 250 mandates. He now a member of the agriculture, forestry, and water management committee; a deputy member of the environmental protection committee and the committee on spatial planning, transport, infrastructure, and telecommunications; the head of Serbia's parliamentary friendship group with Tajikistan; and a member of the parliamentary friendship groups with Austria, Bahrain, Brazil, Canada, Chile, China, Denmark, Egypt, Georgia, Italy, Japan, Kazakhstan, Luxembourg, Mexico, Moldova, Morocco, Norway, Portugal, Russia, Spain, South Africa, Switzerland, the United Arab Emirates, the United Kingdom, the United States of America, and Venezuela.
