= Radovanje Grove =

Oak forest near Velika Plana, Serbia

Memorial Park Bubanj
- Радовањски луг / Radovanjski lug (Serbian)
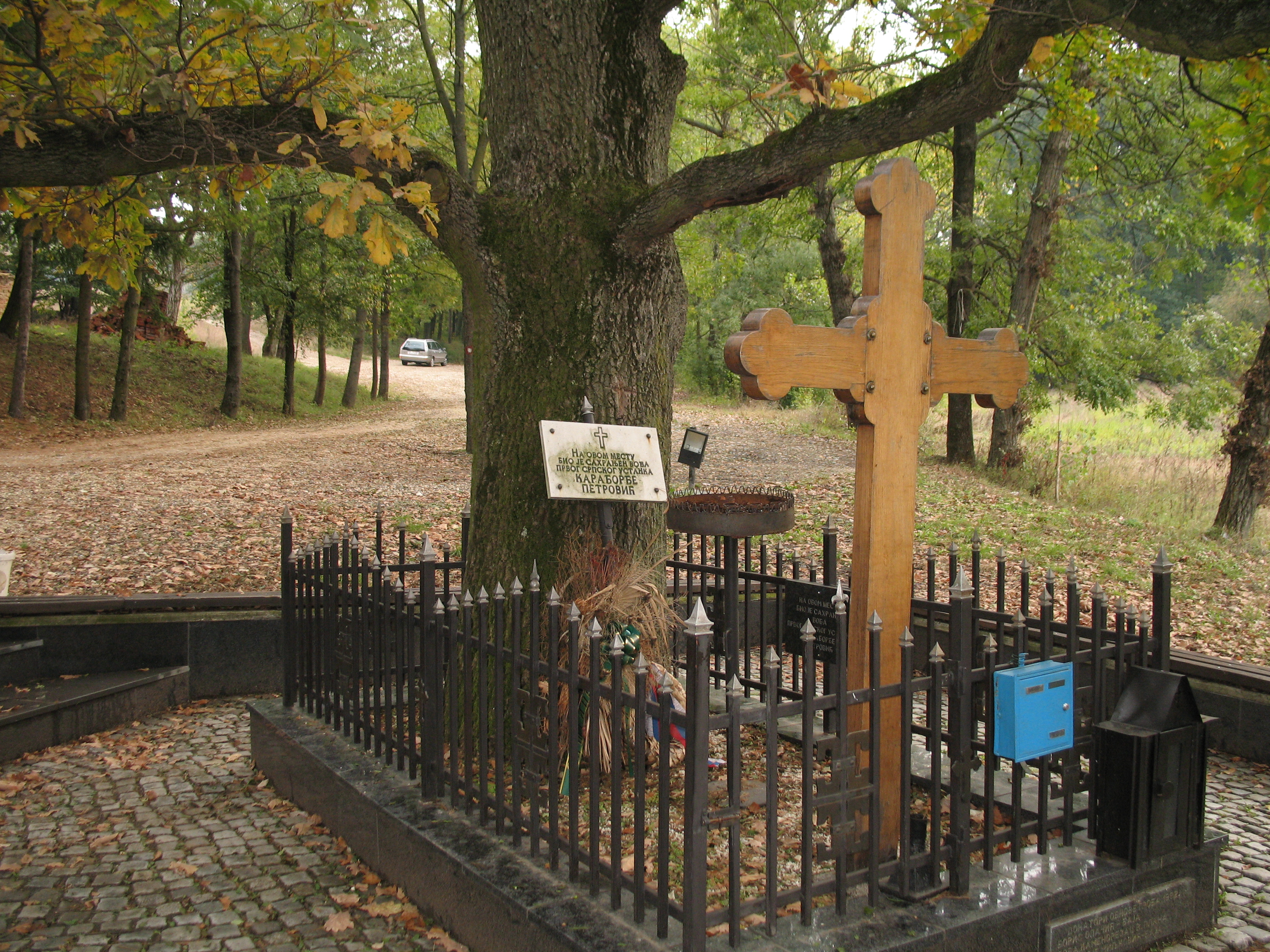
- Former grave of Karađorđe Petrović in Radovanje Grove
- Interactive map of Memorial Park Bubanj
- 44°16′50″N 21°02′10″E
- Type: Memorial park
- Location: Velika Plana, Serbia

History
- Built: 1817/1936

Cultural Heritage of Serbia
- Type: Immovable Cultural Heritage of Exceptional Importance
- Designated: 1989
- Reference no.: ЗМ 21

Radovanje Grove (Serbian: Радовањски луг / Radovanjski lug) is an oak forest located near Radovanje, Serbia. It is a natural memorial monument that covers 46 hectares (0.46 km^{2}). It was first marked during the reign of Serbian Prince Alexander Karađorđević, and a memorial church dedicated to Karađorđe was built in 1936. It was categorized as Immovable Cultural Heritage of Exceptional Importance in 1979.

== History ==
Returning from exile in Russia in 1817, Karađorđe Petrović as leader of the First Serbian Uprising and Revolutionary Serbia, and his companion Naum Krnar stayed at a field hut owned by Dragić Vojkić in Radovanje Grove, in the Radovanje village. However, Miloš Obrenović I who had come to an arrangement with the Ottoman Turks as leader of the semi-autonomous Principality of Serbia, ordered for Karađorđe and Krnar to be assassinated. Nikola Novaković, a confidant of Vujica Vulićević, cut off Karađorđe's head with a yatagan, and killed Krnar with a shotgun. He buried them, both headless in a grave 100 feet away from the hut to the stream, and their heads, skinless and stuffed, were sent to Istanbul in order to prove to the Ottomans that the two were dead.

The place of the assassination is marked by a large wooden cross with marble slab with text. Memorial church dedicated to Karađorđe was built in the 1936.

== See also ==
- First Serbian Uprising
- Pokajnica Monastery
- Immovable Cultural Heritage of Exceptional Importance
