= Sima Avramović =

Serbian lawyer and legal scholar

Sima Avramovic
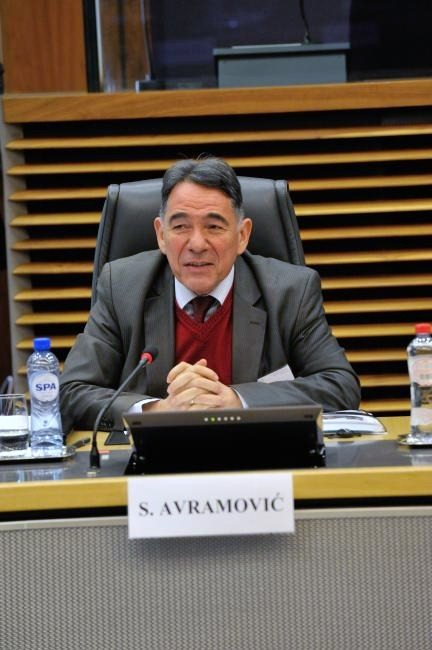
- Speaking at the European Commission (Brussels)

55th Dean of Belgrade Law School
- In office October 2012 – 2018
- Preceded by: Mirko Vasiljević
- Succeeded by: Vladan Petrov (acting dean)

Personal details
- Born: Sima Avramović; July 19, 1950 (age 76) Belgrade, Serbia
- Education: University of Belgrade Faculty of Law
- Occupation: Professor; Lawyer; Administrator
- Website: simaavramovic.org

Sima Avramovic (Serbian: Сима Аврамовић / Sima Avramović) (b. 1950) is a Serbian university professor, author on the subjects of comparative law, legal history, law and religion, Roman law, rhetoric and Ambassador of Serbia to the Vatican City State.

Prof. Avramović served as Dean of the University of Belgrade's Faculty of Law from 2012 until 2018. He was also President of the University of Belgrade's Senate.

== Biography ==
Sima Avramovic was born in Belgrade, Yugoslavia, on July 19, 1950. He graduated from the University of Belgrade Faculty of Law in 1973.

Avramovic extensively serves as a distinguished lecturer at leading universities in Greece, North Macedonia, Bosnia-Herzegovina, Austria, Italy, the United States, Germany, England and Scotland. His past academic assignments include the following: President of the Commission for the University of Belgrade Bologna Follow Up, President of the Statutory Commission of the University of Belgrade, Member of the Organization for Security and Co-operation in Europe/Office for Democratic Institutions and Human Rights Panel of Experts, editor-in-chief of the Belgrade Law Review, Member of the Universities’ of Serbia Conference, Member of the Section for Sources of Serbian Law at the Serbian Academy of Sciences and Arts, President of the Center for Cooperation among Religious Communities, President of the Society for Roman Law and Classics Forum Romanum, President of the Alan Watson Foundation, and he led the Center for Oratory Institutio oratoria. In addition, Avramovic is the founder of the monthly bulletin of the University of Belgrade's Law School (Acta Diurna). He is also an editorial board member for the Journal of Matica Srpska for Classical Studies, and the European Lawyer Journal. Avramovic holds the Doctor of Philosophy degree from the University of Belgrade. In 1984, he was a Fulbright Scholar at the University of Maryland.

He speaks English, German, Greek, French, Italian, Russian and Serbian, and knows two classical languages – Ancient Greek and Latin.

Avramović was one of the candidates of the Serbian Progressive Party for the Assembly of the City of Belgrade in 2018.

In 2021 he was appointed the Serbian ambassador to the Vatican City.

== Legal scholarship ==
Avramovic has over one hundred books and articles to his credit. Selected scholarship includes the pioneering books Rhetorike Techne (2008), State-Church Law in Serbia (2007), Comparative Legal Tradition (2006), Аrs Rhetorica (2002), General Legal History (2001), The Court Speeches of Isaeus and the Law of Athens (1988), Early Greek Law and the Code of Gortyn (1977), Evolution of Testamentary Freedom in Ancient Greek Law (1981), Foundations of Modern Democracy, Selected Declarations and Charters on Human Rights (1989). Recent articles include “Searching for the New Law on Religious Freedom in Serbia” (European Academy of Sciences and Arts, Weimar 2006), “Simulation of Athenian Court – A New Teaching Method” in the Balkans Law Review (2006), “The Rhetra of Epithadeus and Testament in Spartan Law” (Austrian Academy of Sciences, Vienna 2005), et al. His book Ars Rhetorica was proclaimed as Book of the Year 2002 (F.R.Y. Official Gazette Award) and he received the prestigious Italian award Premio romanistico internationale “Gérard Boulvert” for the Italian translation of the book Court Speeches of Isaeus and the Law of Athens.

== Selected works ==
- Rano grčko pravo i Gortinski zakonik, Belgrade, 1977, 217
- Evolucija slobode testiranja u antičkom grčkom pravu (PhD thesis), Belgrade, 1981, 384
- The Quantitative Analysis of the Computerised Data Bank on Disposition in Case of Death in Ancient Greek Law, University of Maryland, College Park 1984, 90 (Library of Congress Reg.No. TXY 84-170-582).
- Isejevo sudsko besedništvo i atinsko pravo, Naučna knjiga, Belgrade, 1988 (1991), VIII+266; Službeni list SRJ, Belgrade, 2000 (2005), 270.
- Temelji moderne demokratije, Izbor deklaracija i povelja o ljudskim pravima, Nova knjiga, Belgrade, 1989, 237 (p.. 13-25, 47-57, 75-83, 97-103, 111-119, 125-133).
- Sto pedeset godina Pravnog fakulteta 1841-1991, Faculty of Law, Belgrade. 1991, 196, co-author
- Pravna istorija Starog veka, Službeni list SRJ, Belgrade. 1992, 138.
- Osnovi retorike i besedništva, Zavod za udžbenike i nastavna sredstva, Belgrade. 1993 (1999), 182, co-author with dr Obrad Stanojević
- Opšta pravna istorija, I deo, Dosije, Belgrade. 1994 (1995, 1996, 1998), 159.
- Iseo e il diritto attic, Jovene editore, Napoli 1997, 294.
- Opšta pravna istorija - Stari i Srednji vek, Dosije, Belgrade. 1999, 363 (2000, 2001).
- Ars rhetorica – veština besedništva, Sl. list SRJ, Belgrade. 2002, (2003), 529, co-author with dr Obrad Stanojević
- Opšta pravna istorija - Stari i Srednji vek, Nomos, Belgrade. 2003 (2004), 239.
- Opšta pravna istorija – Novi vek, Nomos, Belgrade. 2004, 87.
- Uporedna pravna tradicija, Nomos, Belgrade. 2006, 319, co-author with V. Stanimirović
- Prilozi nastanku državno-crkvenog prava u Srbiji (State-Church Law in Serbia). Faculty of Law, Faculty of Orthodox Theology and JP Službeni glasnik, Belgrade. 2007, 250.
- Rhetorike techne – veština besedništva i javni nastup Službeni glasnik, Edicija Pravnog fakulteta Retorika, Belgrade. 2008, 526.
- Uporedna pravna tradicija, Faculty of Law, 2009, 341, co-author with V. Stanimirović
- Kako da postanem pravnik – uvod u studije prava, co-author with Z. Mirković, Belgrade. 2010, 141.
- The Predicament of Serbian Orthodox Holy Places in Kosovo and Metohia - Elements for a Historical, Legal and Conservational Understanding', co-author, Belgrade. 2010.
- Temelji moderne demokratije, Izbor deklaracija i povelja o ljudskim pravima (koautorski, izmenjeno i dopunjeno izdanje), Zavod za udžbenike, Belgrade. 2011, 548 (17-30, 119-128, 147-154, 172-177, 191-198, 353-359).
- Primenjena retorika – 20 godina takmičenja u besedništvu, Belgrade. 2014, 188.
- Rhetorike techne – veština besedništva i javni nastup, Službeni glasnik, Dosije, Faculty of Law, Belgrade. 2018, 545
- Konflikt und Koexistenz. Die Rechtsordnungen im 19. und 20. Jahrhundert, Bd. II – Serbien Bosnien-Herzegowina, Albanien, „The Serbian Civil Code of 1844: a Battleground of Legal Traditions“, Max-Planck-Institut für europäische Rechtsgeschichte, Frankfurt am Mein 2017, 379-482, autor poglavlja u knjizi

== See also ==
- Belgrade Law Review
- Belgrade Competition in Oratory

== Sources ==
- Biography at Belgrade Law School homepage (in Serbian)
