= Radovanje, Serbia =

Radovanje Радовање
- Village (Selo)
- Location within Serbia
- Coordinates: 44°17′6″N 21°1′29″E
- Country: Serbia
- District: Podunavlje District
- Municipality: Velika Plana

Population (2002)
  - Total: 689
- Time zone: UTC+1 (CET)
  - Summer (DST): UTC+2 (CEST)

Radovanje (Serbian Cyrillic: Радовање) is a village in the municipality of Velika Plana, Serbia. According to the 2002 census, the village has a population of 689 people. Radovanjski Lug was the site of the assassination of Karađorđe Petrović, leader of the First Serbian Uprising, in 1817.
