= Mirko Vasiljević =

Serbian legal scholar

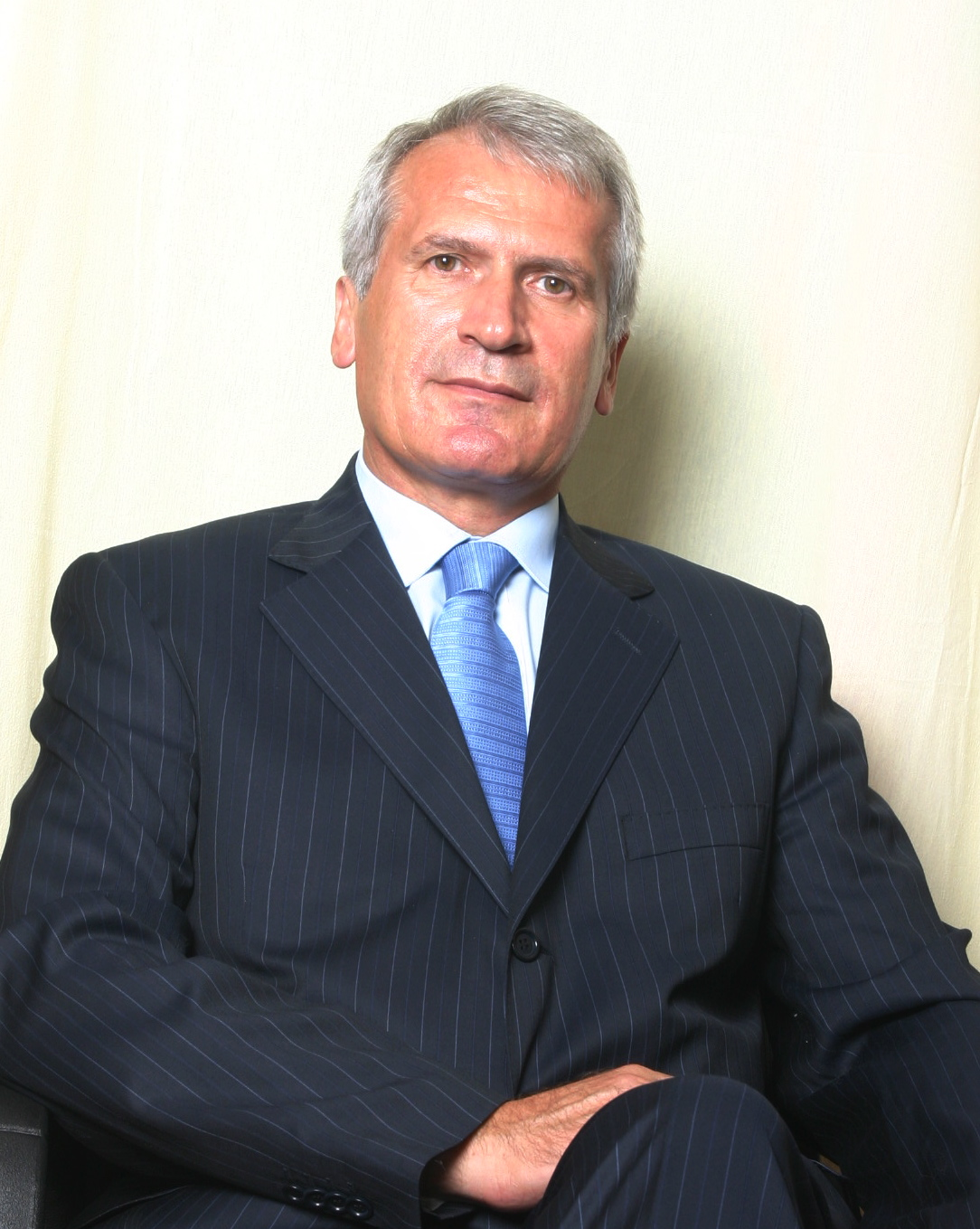
- Mirko Vasiljević.
- Born: October 11, 1949 (age 77); Pravoševo, Prijepolje, SR Serbia, Yugoslavia
- Occupations: Professor, Legal scholar, Arbiter

Academic background
- Education: University of Belgrade
- Thesis: Пословодни орган (1980)
- Influences: Valtazar Bogišić, Slobodan Perović, Robert W. Hamilton

Academic work
- Discipline: Civil law scholar
- Sub-discipline: Corporate law, Commercial law, Arbitration, Law of obligations

Mirko Vasiljević (Serbian Cyrillic: Мирко Васиљевић) is a Serbian legal scholar and a professor at the University of Belgrade. He served as the Dean of the Belgrade Faculty of Law from 2004 to 2012. Vasiljević is one of Serbia's foremost experts in corporate law.

== Personal life ==
Mirko Vasiljević was born on October 11, 1949, in the village of Pravoševo, municipality Prijepolje, Socialist Republic of Serbia, Federal People's Republic of Yugoslavia. He worked for 2 years in a car factory in Priboj before becoming an assistant professor at the University of Belgrade in 1975. He was a benefactor to several churches and monasteries in Serbia, including the Monastery of Saint Cosma and Damian on Zlatar.

== Arbitration ==
Mirko Vasiljević is the president of the Permanent arbitration of the Serbian Chamber of Commerce. Vasiljević is a member of the International Court of Arbitration as well as of the International Centre for Settlement of Investment Disputes.

== Notable works ==
- Vasiljević, Mirko (2017). Компанијско право. Belgrade: University of Belgrade Faculty of Law. ISBN 978-86-7630-709-8.
- Vasiljević, Mirko (2018). Kompanijsko i trgovinsko pravo: priručnici za polaganje pravosudnog ispita. Belgrade: Službeni Glasnik Srbije. ISBN 978-86-519-1395-5.
