= Koporin =

Serbian monastery

Coordinates: 44°18′54.51″N 21°00′06.07″E

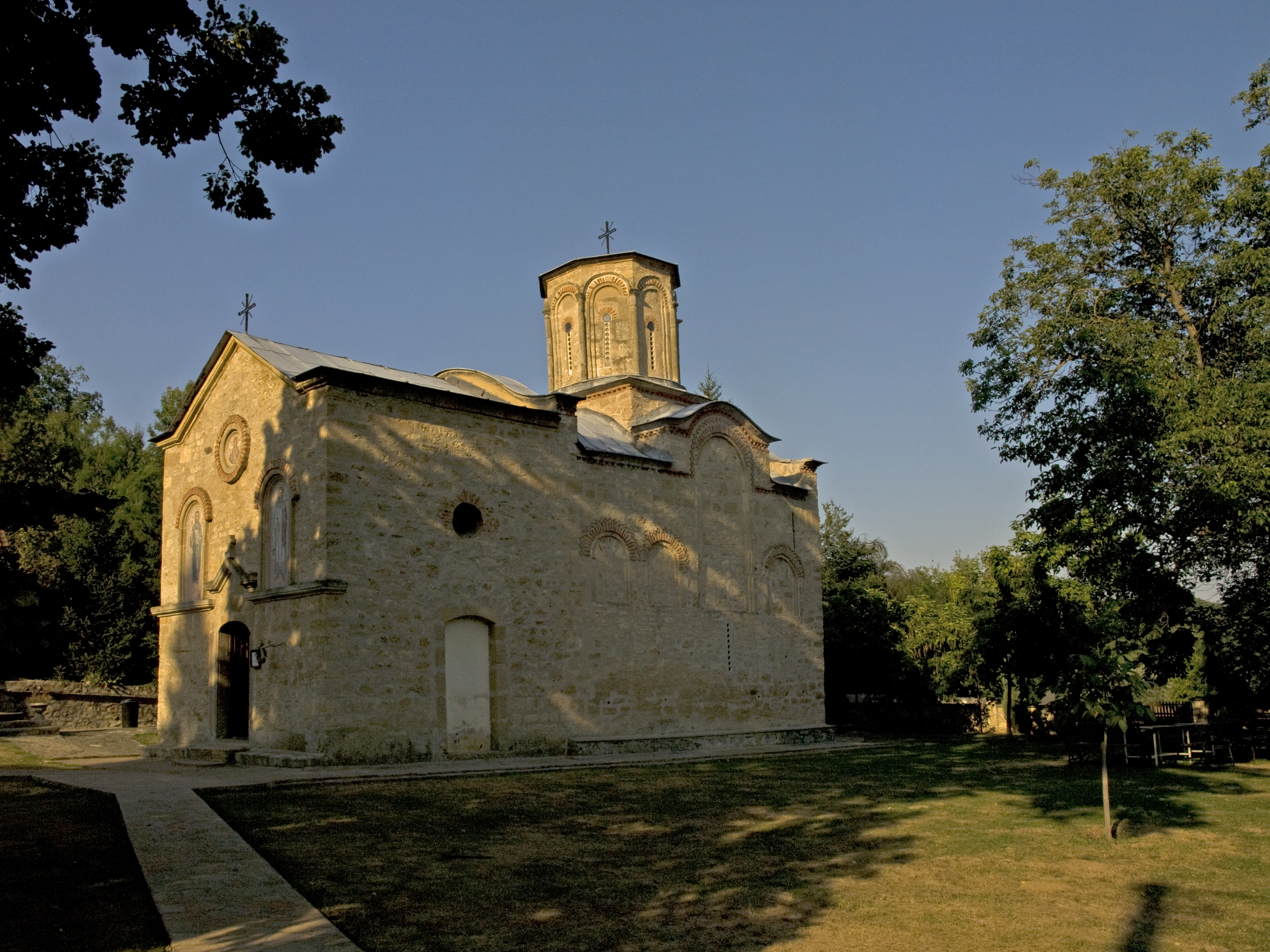
Saint Stephen Church

The Koporin Monastery (Serbian: Манастир Копорин, romanized: Manastir Koporin) is a monastery at the outskirts of the town of Velika Plana, Serbia, just off the road to Smederevska Palanka. The monastery church, dedicated to St. Stephen, was built during the reign of Despot Stefan Lazarević (1389–1427) whose portrait is preserved as a fresco inside the church, under the inscription "Despot". Stefan Lazarević acquired this title after the Battle of Ankara in 1402, and on that basis the painting was dated. The ktetor and the exact time of the monastery's founding is unknown. Stefan Lazarević is buried in this church. The monastery was in a dilapidated state until the 1880s, when reconstruction began. In the late 1950s and 1960s, massive conservation of architectural elements and paintings was finished.

Koporin Monastery was declared a Monument of Culture of Great Importance in 1979, and it is protected by the Republic of Serbia.

== See also ==
- Tourism in Serbia
