= Belgrade Competition in Oratory =

The Belgrade Competition in Oratory is an annual academic event at the University of Belgrade's Law School, which has gained significant popularity of the general public all over Serbia. In this competition students deliver their speeches on both free-choice and given topics. The event represents an opportunity for students to express their critical opinions in front of government officials sitting in the front rows of the audience, when the largest lecture hall at the law school is filled to capacity. The competition is broadcast live on the national television program.

This event is traditionally organized by university professors Obrad Stanojević and Sima Avramović, the founders of the Center for Oratory Institutio oratoria, which gathers the University of Belgrade's Law School students interested in developing public speaking skills and prepares them for competitions. These scholars hold an optional course on rhetoric at the Law School and both are authors of textbooks on rhetoric.

Following the example of the Belgrade Law School, several educational institutions in the region organize their own similar events. The winners of local competitions throughout Serbia take part in the Serbian universities wide finals.
