= Miroljub Jevtić =

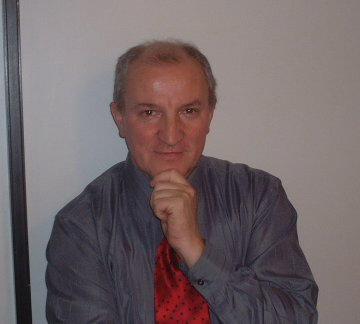
Miroljub Jevtić

Miroljub Jevtić (born 1955) is a Serbian Politologist of religion and professor at the Faculty of Political Science, University of Belgrade.

== Career ==
He was born in Vranje, SFR Yugoslavia,

Jevtić graduated from the Faculty of Political Science at the University of Belgrade, Serbia. He received a master's degree from the University of Belgrade's Law School; his thesis was entitled ”Islamic understanding of war and the role of the Islamic Conference in preserving the peace”. Jevtić studied for his doctorate at the Faculty of Political Science, University of Belgrade, Serbia. His thesis was titled ”Modern Jihad and war”. Jevtić began his academic career in the 1983 as a teacher of People defence and protection (Narodna odbrana i zaštita), a course that was abolished with the breakup of socialism in Southeast Europe in the beginning of the 1990s. Founder and editor-in-chief of the “Polititcs and Religion” journal, , the first global scientific journal dedicated to the discipline ”Political Science of Religion“ or “Politicology of Religion”. The first issue was published in 2007, in Belgrade, Serbia. Published by the ”Center for Study of Religion and Religious Tolerance”.

At the Faculty of Political Sciences in Belgrade, he has progressed through all academic ranks, from assistant trainee in 1983 to full professor in 1998. He teaches the course "Religion and Politics."

Jevtić was the author of the monograph dedicated to the Jihad in the Balkans. It was the first such publication ever published in the area covered by his research.

Professor Jevtić was one of the earliest academics in the field to introduce 1993/94 "Politology of Religion" or “Politicology of Religion“ in the curriculum of the Faculty of Political Science. Jevtić coined the term White Al-Qaeda.

== Criticism ==
Jevtić's views on Islam as an aggressive religion are subject to controversy and are disputed by some western and other scholars. He has been criticized as a "propagandist" in the context of anti-Bosniak and anti-Albanian attitude in the context of the Yugoslav wars, and that they picture Islam as backward and violent as a rule. Jevtić in 1990 claimed that Sandžak Muslims are “neither Muslims, nor Bosniaks, nor Kemal Ataturk’s Turks. They are Ottomans".

Professor of Islamic studies H.T. Norris contends that scholars like Jevtić were used by the Serbian media throughout the 1980s to justify their anti-Muslim prejudices and to stroke anti-Muslim hatred among Serbs. In a 1989 interview with the Serbian journal Duga, Jevtić claimed that Islam is aggressive and violent by nature and that Arab Muslims are trying to impose a global Islamic state and attempting to rekindle Islam in Yugoslavia as a step to accomplishing that goal. In the same interview, Jevtić also claimed that the Bosniaks are traitors to their race and that embracing Islam was a grave act of disloyalty and betrayal. Norris argues that these anti-Muslim and anti-Bosniak pieces and their use by like-minded scholars ultimately succeeded in sowing hatred among the Serbs towards Muslims which helped justify their resulting violence against them.

== Books ==
- Challenges of Politology of Religion, Center for Study of Religion and Religious Tolerance, Belgrade,2014,ISBN 978-86-87243-12-5
- Problems of Politology of Religion, Center for Study of Religion and Religious Tolerance, Belgrade,2012,ISBN 978-86-87243-08-8
- Political Relations and Religion, Center for Study of Religion and Religious Tolerance, Belgrade,2011,ISBN 978-86-87243-06-4
- Religion as Challenge of Political Science, Center for Study of Religion and Religious Tolerance, Belgrade,2010, ISBN 978-86-87243-02-6
- Politology of Religion, Center for Study of Religion and Religious Tolerance, Belgrade, 2009, ISBN 978-86-87243-01-9
- Religion and Power, Essays on Politology of Religion, Dioceze of Ras-Prizren and Kosovo-Metohija;Center for Study of Religion and Religious Tolerance, Belgrade, 2008,ISBN 978-86-82323-29-7(English Edition)
- Religion and Politics – Introduction to Politicology of Religion; Institute for Political Studies and Faculty of Political Science; Belgrade, Serbia; 2002; ISBN 86-7419-048-0.
- Modern Jihad as War; First Edition – 1989; Nova Knjiga, Belgrade, Serbia; ISBN 86-7335-052-2; Second Edition – 1995; Grafomotajica, Prnjavor, Bosnia and Herzegovina; ISBN 86-7116-001-7; Third Edition – 2001; Nikola Pašić, Belgrade, Serbia; ISBN 86-7987-010-2.
- From the Islamic Declaration to the Religious War in Bosnia and Herzegovina; First Edition – 1993; Filip Višnjić, Belgrade, Serbia; ISBN 86-7363-125-4; Second Edition – 1995; Grafomotajica, Prnjavor, Bosnia and Herzegovina; ISBN 86-7116-002-5.
- Albanians and Islam – 1995; Grafomotajnica, Prnjavor, Bosnia and Herzegovina; ISBN 86-7116-003-3.
- Islam in the Works of Ivo Andrić – 2000; Private Edition, Prosveta Internacional, Belgrade, Serbia.
- All Our Delusions – 1998; Private Edition, Prosveta Internacional, Belgrade, Serbia.
- Islam and Geo-Political Logic – 1995; Co-Authored With Others; Koving-Inžinjering, Belgrade, Serbia.
- The crime Awaits the Punishment – 1997; Co-Authored With Others; Megilot Publishing, Olet Press/ Imel Publishing, (Novi Sad, Srpsko Sarajevo); ISBN 86-7170-001-1.(English Edition)
- Muslims between Religion and Nation – 1996; Co-Authored with Others; People and University Library Petar Kocić, Banja Luka, Bosnia and Herzegovina; ISBN 86-7044-030-X.

== Internet Publications ==
- Religion as a Determining Factor in the West’s Siding With Albanian Secessionism (English)
- Religion as a Determining Factor in the West’s Siding With Albanian Secessionism (Serbian)
- Jihad in Domestic and International Public (Serbian)
