= Miloševac (Šabac) =

Miloševac Милошевац (Serbian)
- Village (Selo)
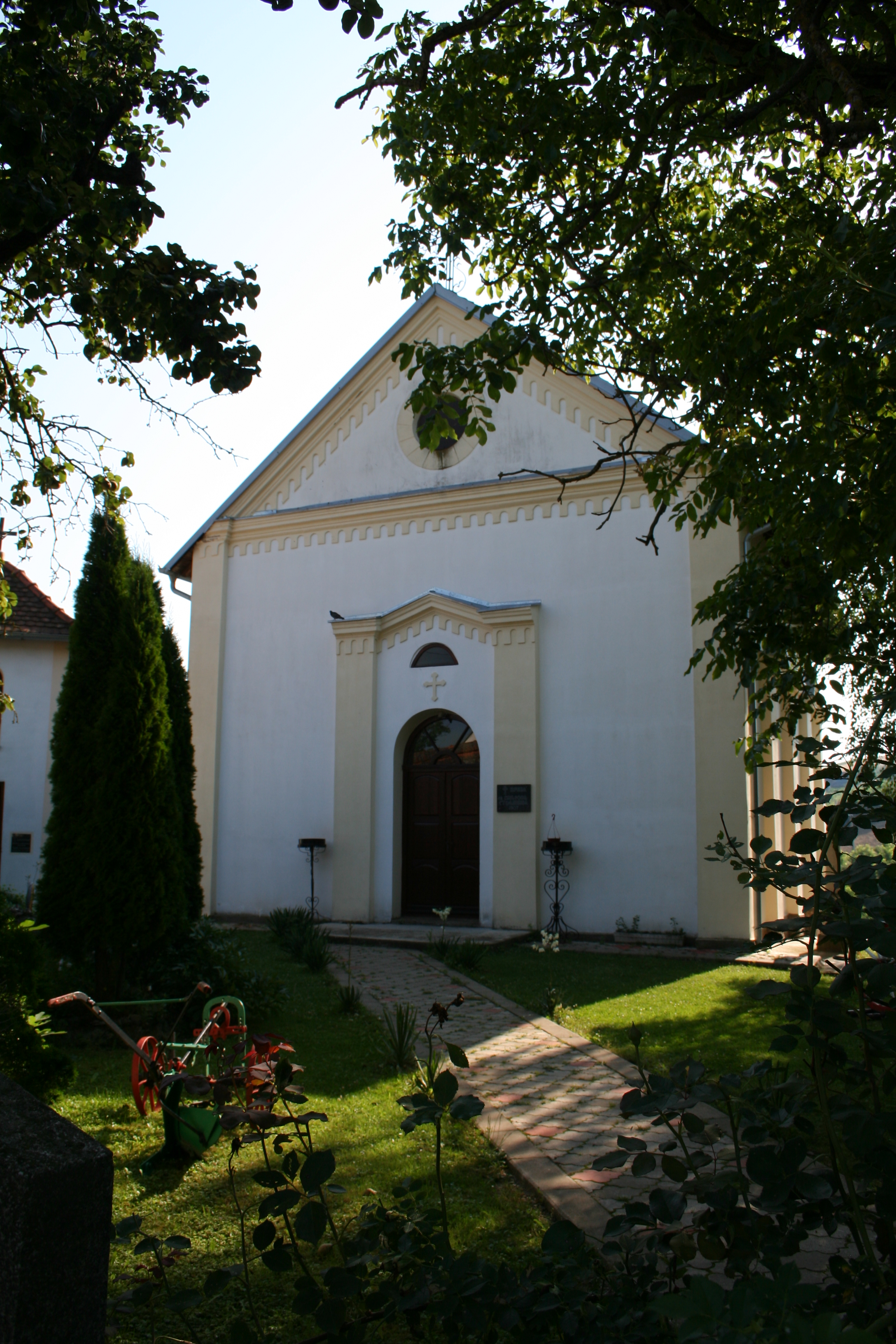

- Location within Serbia
- Coordinates: 44°36′20″N 19°32′15″E
- Country: Serbia
- District: Mačva District
- Municipality: Šabac

Population (2002)
  - Total: 95
- Time zone: UTC+1 (CET)
  - Summer (DST): UTC+2 (CEST)

Miloševac is a village in the municipality of Šabac, Serbia. According to the 2002 census, the village has a population of 95 people.
