= Pokajnica Monastery =

Monastery complex in Velika Plana, Serbia

Coordinates: 44.310380°N 21.056367°E

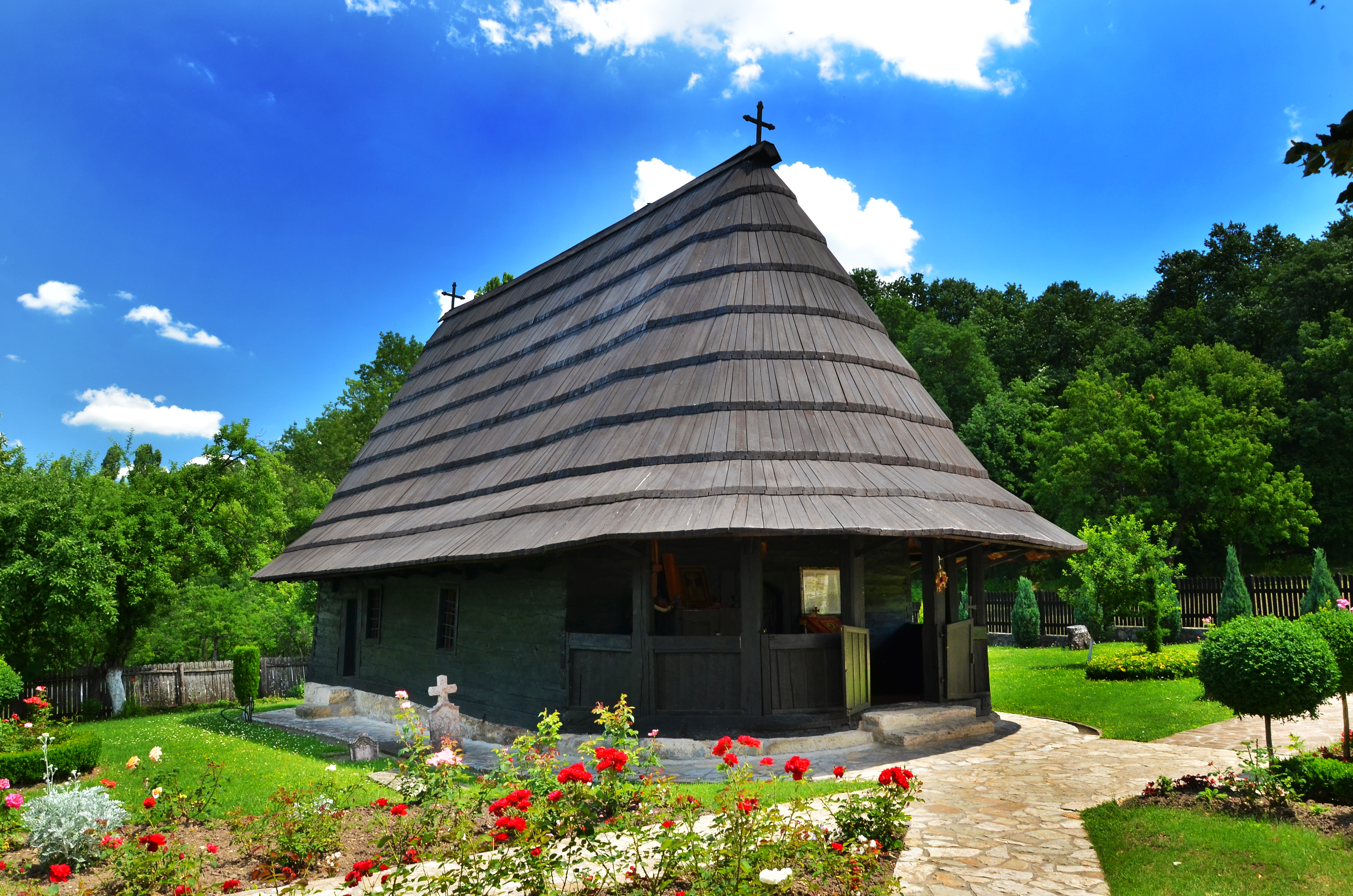
Pokajnica Monastery in Velika Plana, Serbia

The Pokajnica Monastery (Serbian: Манастир Покајница, romanized: Manastir Pokajnica, lit. "Repentance Monastery") is a monastery complex in Velika Plana, Serbia.

== History ==
The monastery served as a parish church until 1954, when it was turned into a monastery. Originally built in 1818, the interior of the Church's iconostasis was carved by a local craftsman.

In the churchyard there is a wooden bell tower as well as living quarters, probably from the time of construction of the church, with wooden bars on the windows. Conservation work on the church were carried out in 1951, and on the iconostasis in 1987–88.

In 1979 the Republic of Serbia declared Pokajnica a Monument of Culture of Exceptional Importance, and as such it is protected by law.

== See also ==
- Karađorđe
- Monument of Culture of Exceptional Importance
- Tourism in Serbia
- List of Serbian Orthodox monasteries

== Literature ==
- Regional Chamber of Požarevac, prepared by Dr Radmila Novaković Kostić, 2005.
