= Velika Plana =

Velika Plana Велика Плана (Serbian)
- Town and municipality
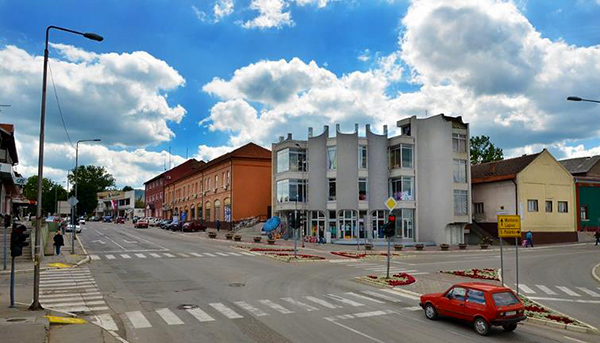
- Town centre

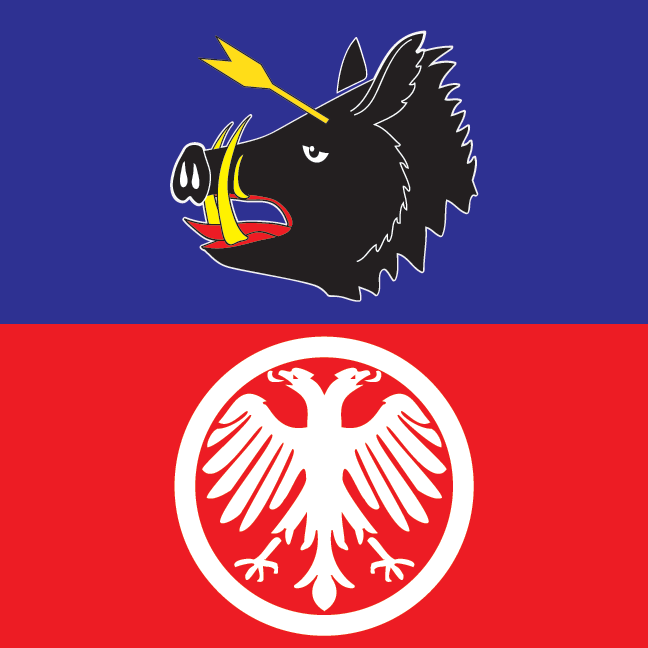
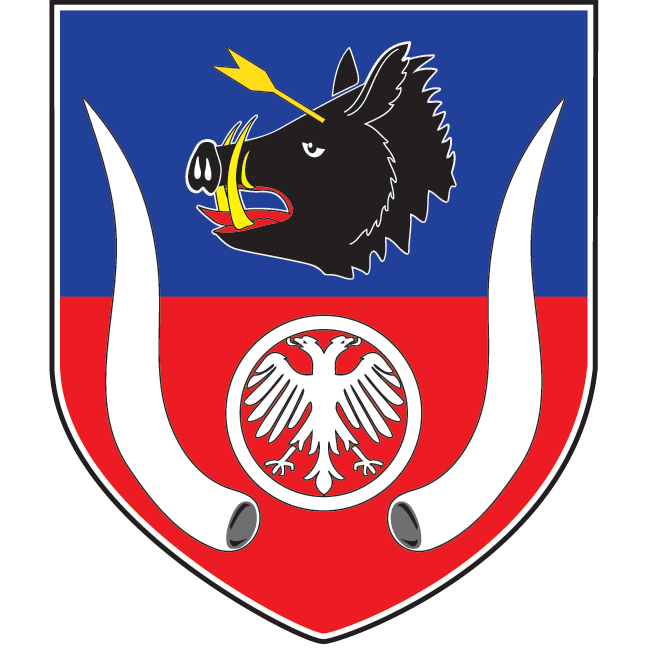
- Flag Coat of arms

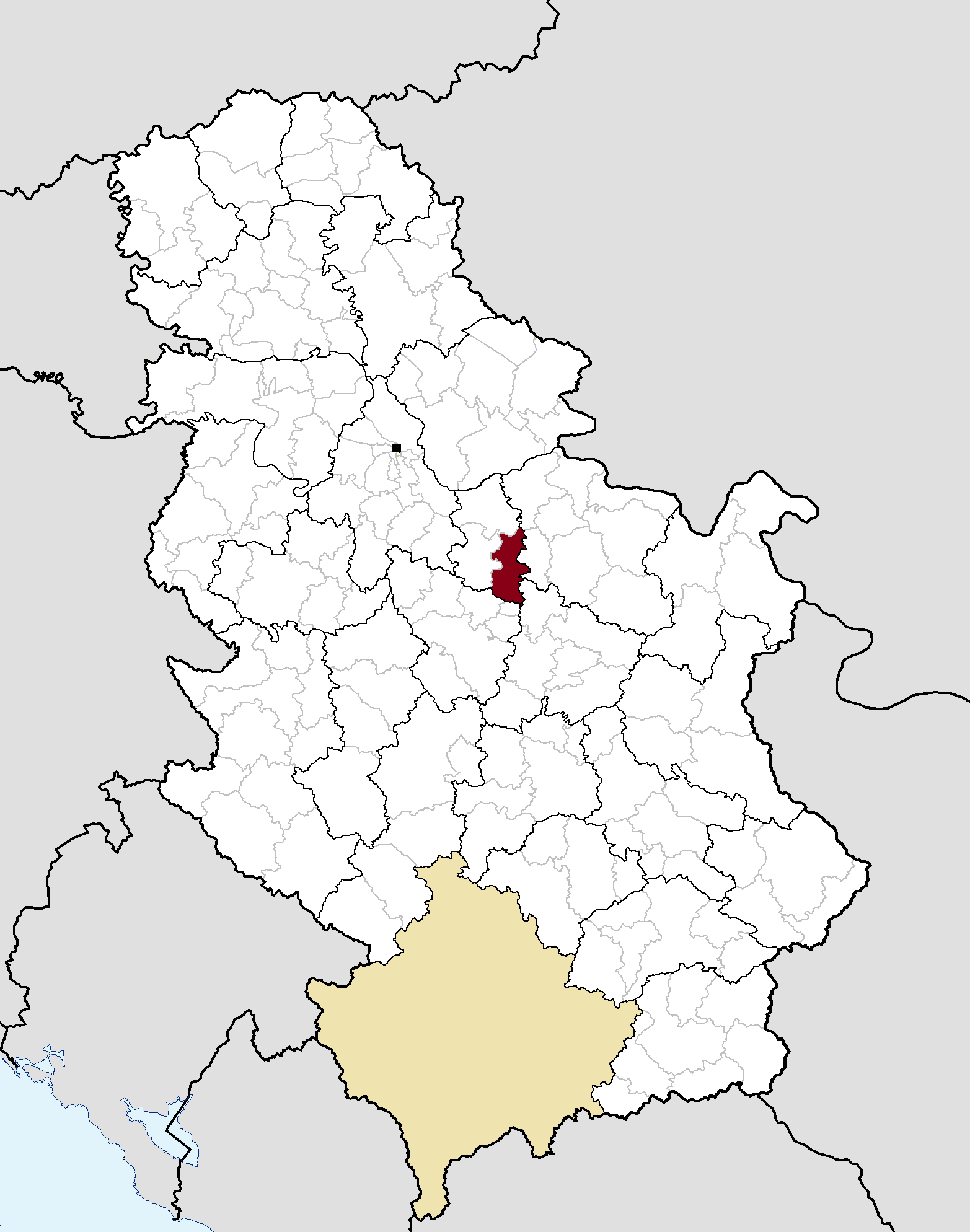
- Location of the municipality of Velika Plana within Serbia
- Coordinates: 44°20.041′N 21°04.61′E
- Country: Serbia
- Region: Southern and Eastern Serbia
- District: Podunavlje
- Settlements: 13

Government
  - Mayor: Strahinja Pavešković (SNS)

Area
  - Town: 47.64 km^{2} (18.39 sq mi)
  - Municipality: 345 km^{2} (133 sq mi)
- Elevation: 123 m (404 ft)

Population (2022 census)
  - Town: 14,609
  - Town density: 306.7/km^{2} (794.2/sq mi)
  - Municipality: 35,451
  - Municipality density: 103/km^{2} (266/sq mi)
- Time zone: UTC+1 (CET)
  - Summer (DST): UTC+2 (CEST)
- Postal code: 11320
- Area code: +381(0)26
- Car plates: VP

Velika Plana (Serbian Cyrillic: Велика Плана, pronounced [ʋêlikaː plǎːna]) is a town and municipality located in the Podunavlje District of Serbia. As of 2022, the town has 14,609 inhabitants, while the municipality has 35,451. Velika Plana lies on the left bank of Velika Morava.

== Neighbourhoods ==
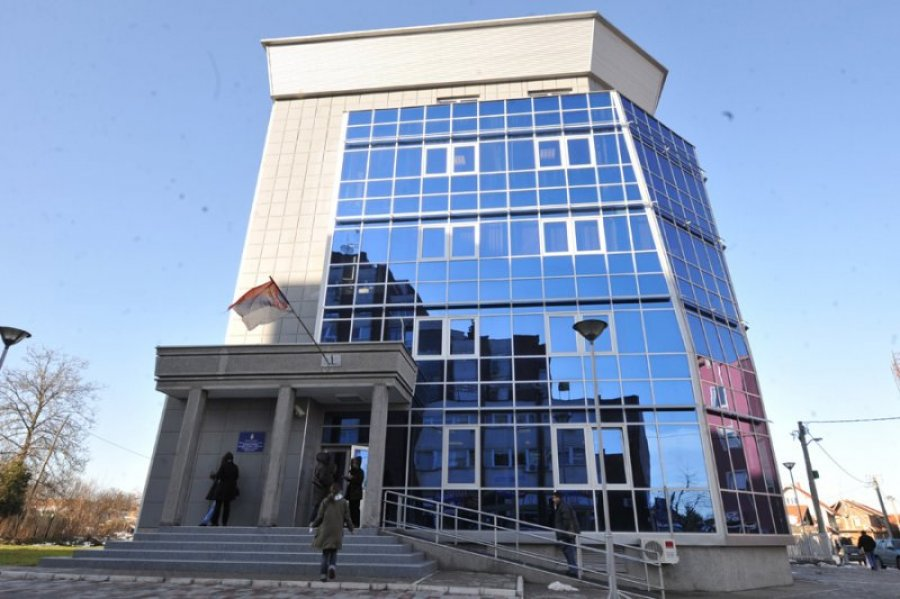
Administration Building

The municipality of Velika Plana has 13 settlements. The town is composed of three townships: Town Mains, Stari Odbor (the Old Downtown), and Bresje. Town Mains is further subdivided into the neighbourhoods of Centar, Bugarija, Đurakovac, Kod Železničke (railway station area), Gloža-Ciglana (brick factory area) where a tiny Morava river village has been reconstructed, and Magareća Glava ('Donkey Head'). There is also a satellite so-called weekend settlement (vikend naselje) next to the Pokajnica monastery between Velika Plana, Staro Selo and Radovanje.

== Demographics ==
Historical population
Year	Pop.	±% p.a.
1948	43,188	—
1953	45,804	+1.18%
1961	46,952	+0.31%
1971	48,443	+0.31%
1981	52,114	+0.73%
1991	50,650	−0.28%
2002	44,167	−1.24%
2011	40,902	−0.85%
2022	35,451	−1.29%

As of the 2011 census, the municipality had 40,902 inhabitants.

=== Ethnic groups ===
The ethnic composition of the municipality:

Ethnic group	Population	%
Serbs	38,761	94.77%
Roma	380	0.93%
Montenegrins	62	0.15%
Macedonians	43	0.11%
Croats	32	0.08%
Yugoslavs	29	0.07%
Romanians	25	0.06%
Bulgarians	24	0.06%
Albanians	19	0.05%
Hungarians	17	0.04%
Others	1,510	3.69%
Total	40,902	

== Economy ==
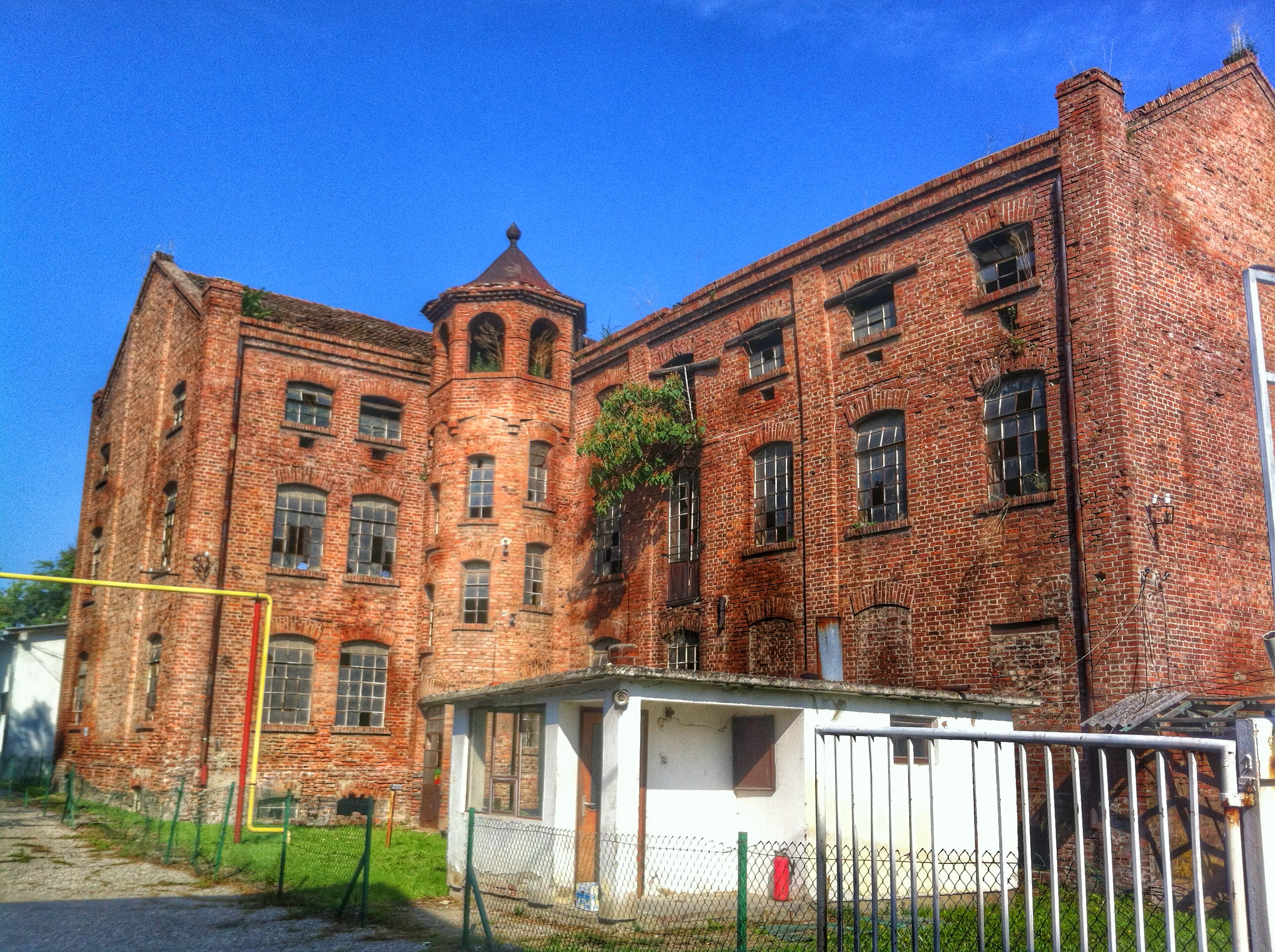
Meat processing plant of Scheuß & Schumacher, built between 1894 and 1902

The origins of industry in Velika Plana are connected to its agricultural environment and starts in the 1880s. Before World War II, there were three slaughterhouses-meat processing plants here, first that of Italian citizen of German origin Toni Klefiš (Tony Klefisch), and later that of Germans Christian Scheuß and Wilhelm Schumacher, and the one whose stocks were owned by a group of three larger and seven smaller Serbian entrepreneurs.

After World War II, all this property was nationalised and unified into a huge plant, expanding to include all sorts of food and food-related production, all the way to clothes and duvets with goose down. These have, however, folded in the 1990s with the disastrous events concurrent with the breakup of the former Yugoslavia.

Today, the main form of industry is a branch of Goša FOM from Smederevska Palanka and the newly opened plant which produces parts for the military industry.

The following table gives a preview of total number of registered people employed in legal entities per their core activity (as of 2018):

Activity	Total
Agriculture, forestry and fishing	167
Mining and quarrying	45
Manufacturing	1,904
Electricity, gas, steam and air conditioning supply	64
Water supply; sewerage, waste management and remediation activities	200
Construction	418
Wholesale and retail trade, repair of motor vehicles and motorcycles	1,837
Transportation and storage	378
Accommodation and food services	362
Information and communication	67
Financial and insurance activities	75
Real estate activities	4
Professional, scientific and technical activities	214
Administrative and support service activities	137
Public administration and defense; compulsory social security	397
Education	626
Human health and social work activities	315
Arts, entertainment and recreation	87
Other service activities	150
Individual agricultural workers	430
Total	7,876

== Transportation ==
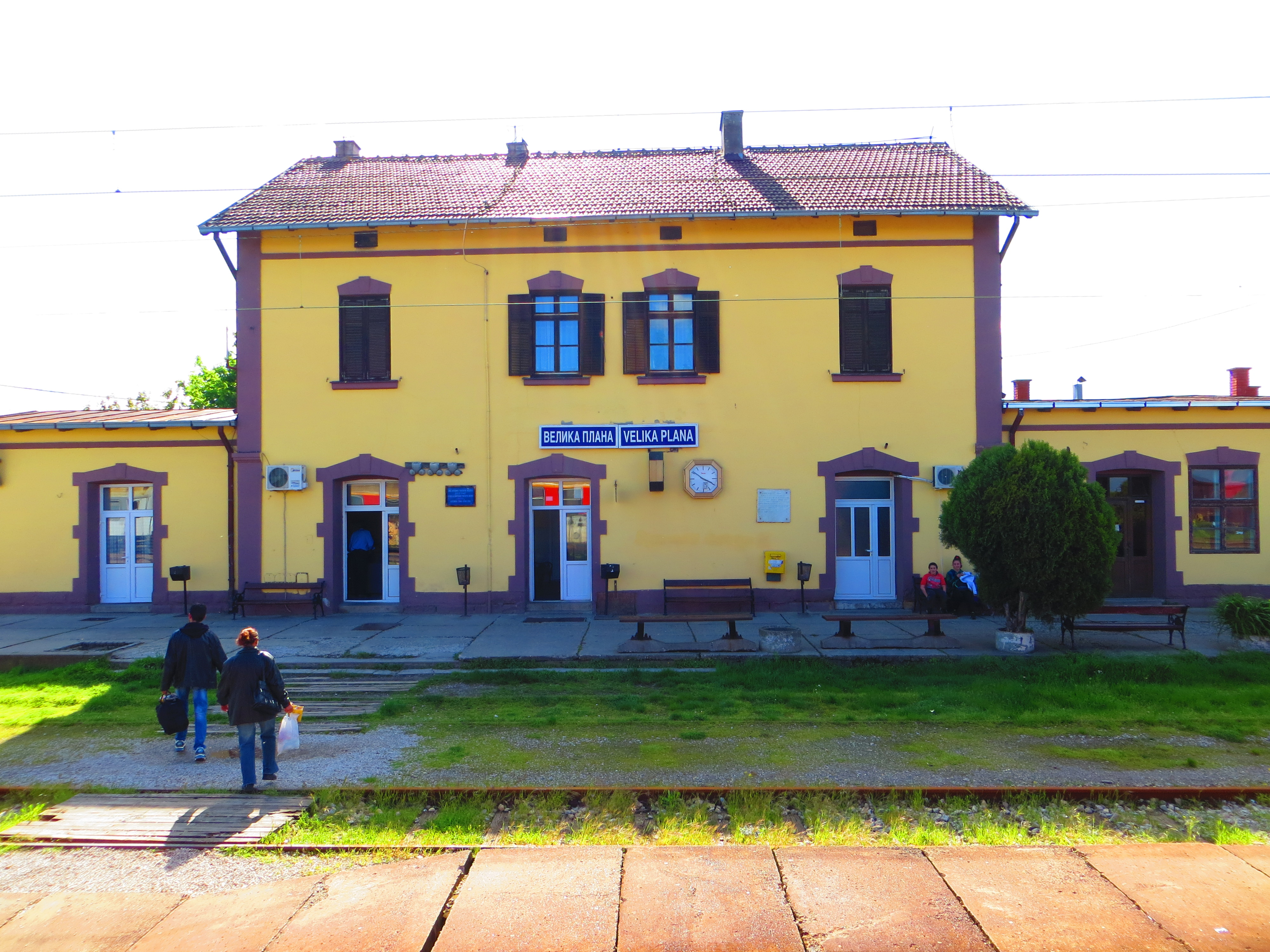
Velika Plana Train Station

The main Serbian A1 motorway from Subotica to Niš goes by the town. The town is also an important railroad junction. Twin tracks go south toward Niš, a track goes west to Belgrade, and a track goes north to Mala Krsna junction, where it splits towards Belgrade, Smederevo and Požarevac. This, in combination with the fact that many bus lines from southern Serbia to Belgrade and Vojvodina make a stop at the town bus station, makes Velika Plana an important transportation hub of central Serbia.

== Culture and society ==
=== Education ===
Velika Plana has three elementary schools in the town itself: Sveti Sava (previously named Moša Pijade), Karađorđe (previously named Мiloš Mitrović), and Nadežda Petrović, and 11 in the surrounding suburbs and villages.

It also has three high schools: a gymnasium, technical high school and business assistant high school.

The Velika Plana Veterinary Centre started artificial insemination in cows in 1957 and later expanded to other livestock and claims to be one of the leading centres of its kind in Southeastern Europe.

=== Leisure and historic monuments ===
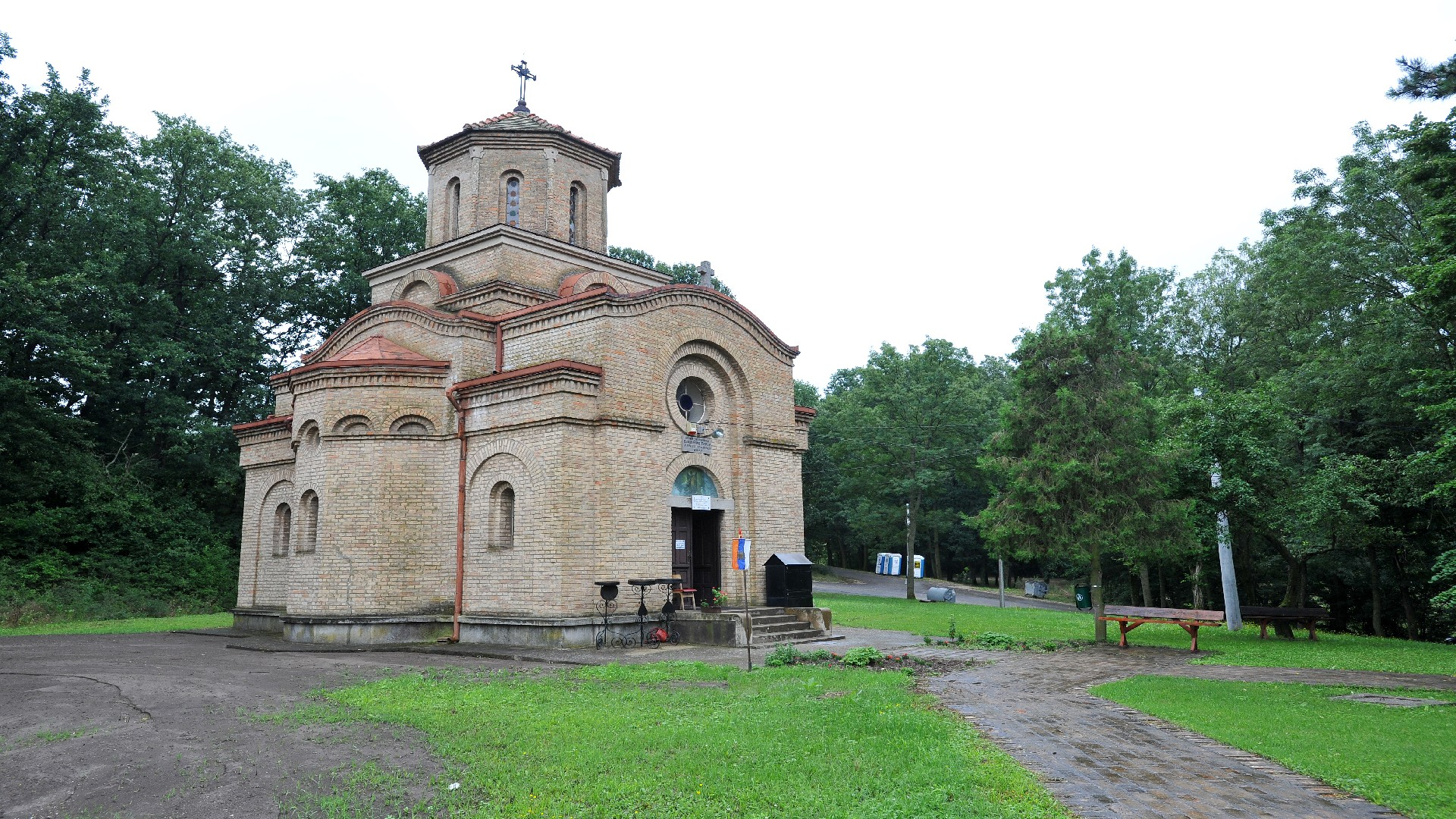
Zahvalnica Church

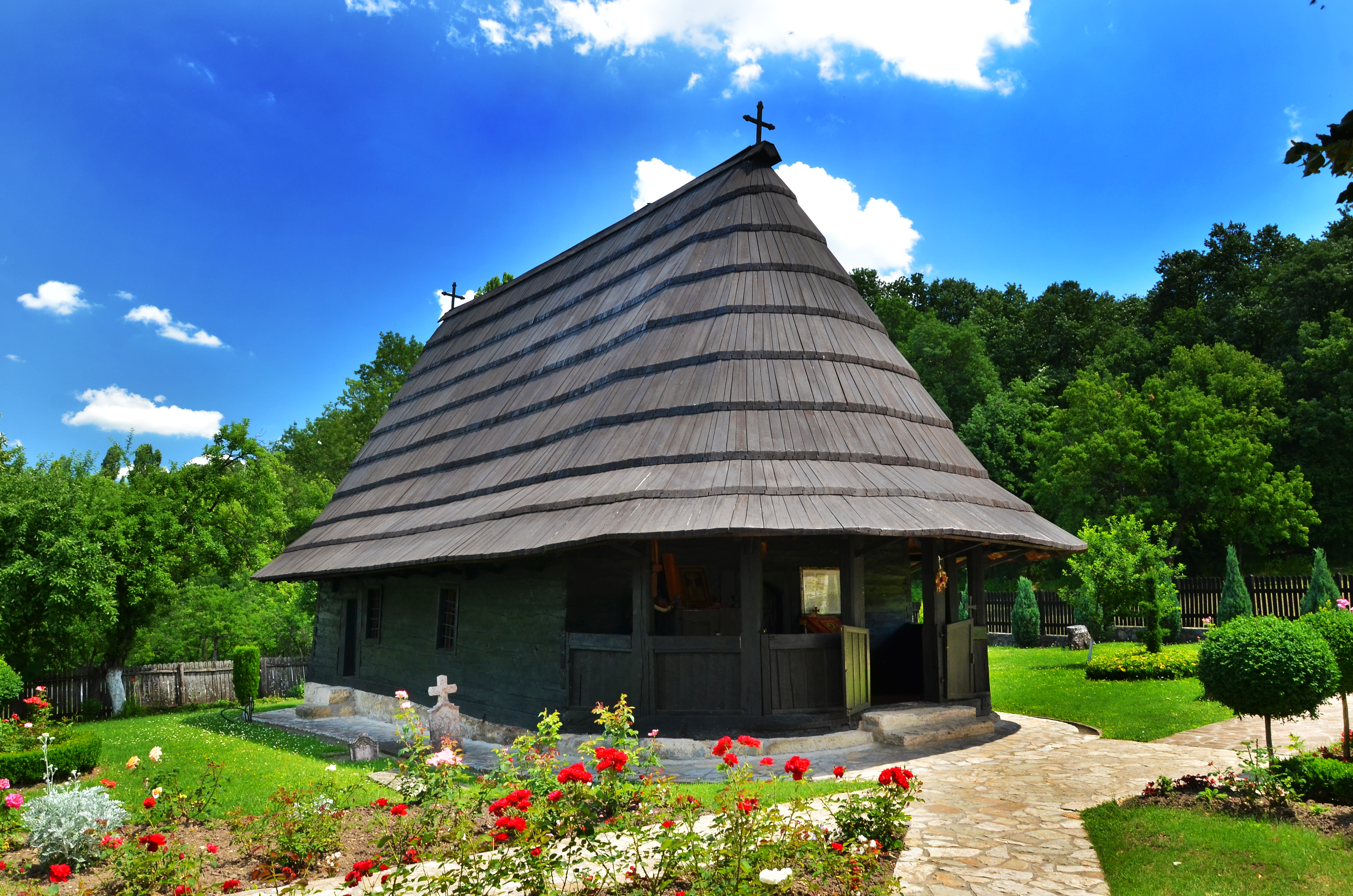
Pokajnica Monastery near Velika Plana

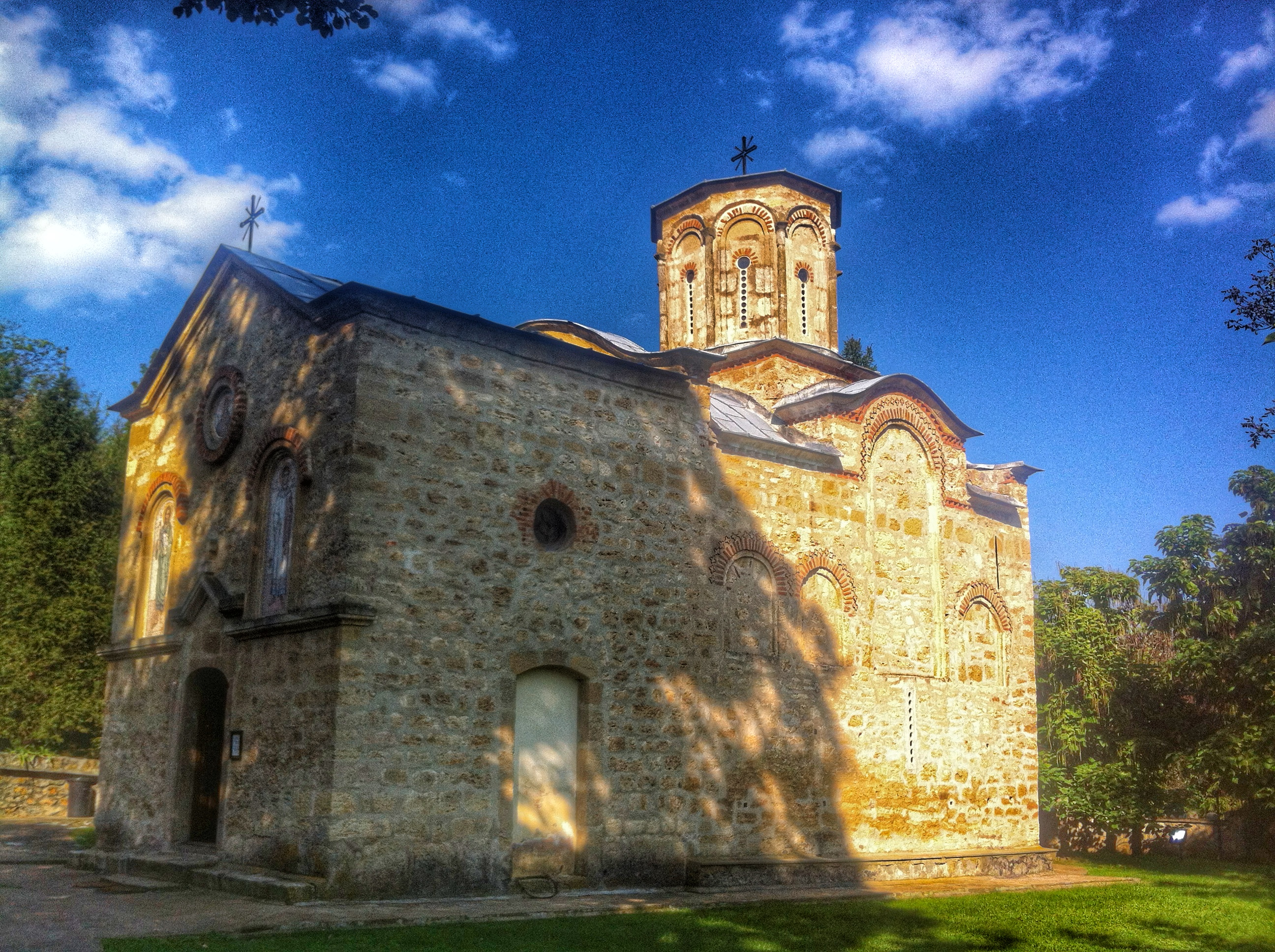
Koporin Monastery

Town has large town park near centre and several smaller parks across town.

At the outskirts of the town are three important ecclesiastical monuments: the early 15th century Koporin Monastery where Despot Stefan Lazarević, son of Prince Lazar of the Battle of Kosovo is buried; the early 19th century Pokajnica Monastery built as a sign of repentance (Serbian: pokajanje/покајање) by the murderer of Karađorđe, leader of the First Serbian Uprising and the founder of the Karađorđević royal family of Serbia and later Yugoslavia; as well as a small church built by King Alexander Karađorđević of Yugoslavia at the exact place of his ancestor's murder.

The latter two are within 4 kilometres (2 miles) from each other, and easily reachable by public transit. Koporin is more secluded but still within 11 km (7 mi) from the other two.

=== Rock festival ===
The Plana Demo Fest rock music festival has been organised since 2009 and is sponsored by the Velika Plana Youth Community Centre.

== Notable people ==
- Kosta Manojlović, ethnomusicologist, co-founder and the first dean of the Conservatory of Music at the University of Arts in Belgrade, born and grew up in Krnjevo
- Aleksandar Tirnanić, a pre-WW II football (soccer) player and coach, born in Krnjevo
- Radomir Lukić, jurist and the youngest person ever appointed as professor at the University of Belgrade Law School was born and grew up in Miloševac
- Velimir Živojinović Massuka, poet, translator, director in chief of the National Theatre in Belgrade, born and grew up in Velika Plana
- Vladimir Petković, art historian and archeologist, member of the Serbian Academy of Arts and Sciences
- Vojislav Koštunica, former President of Yugoslavia and Prime Minister of Serbia (spent summers in Miloševac during all of his childhood, see sr: Милошевац and sr: Војислав Коштуница)
- sh:Snežana Savić, movie actress and singer, was born in Velika Plana.
- Miodrag Kojadinović, Canadian writer, lived in Velika Plana as a child.

== International relations ==
Velika Plana is twinned with:

- Budva, Montenegro
- Conselice, Italy
- Radoviš, North Macedonia

== See also ==
- Municipalities of Serbia
- Cities and towns in Serbia
- Populated places of Serbia
- Radovanje Grove
