= Miloševac (Velika Plana) =

Miloševac Милошевац
- Town
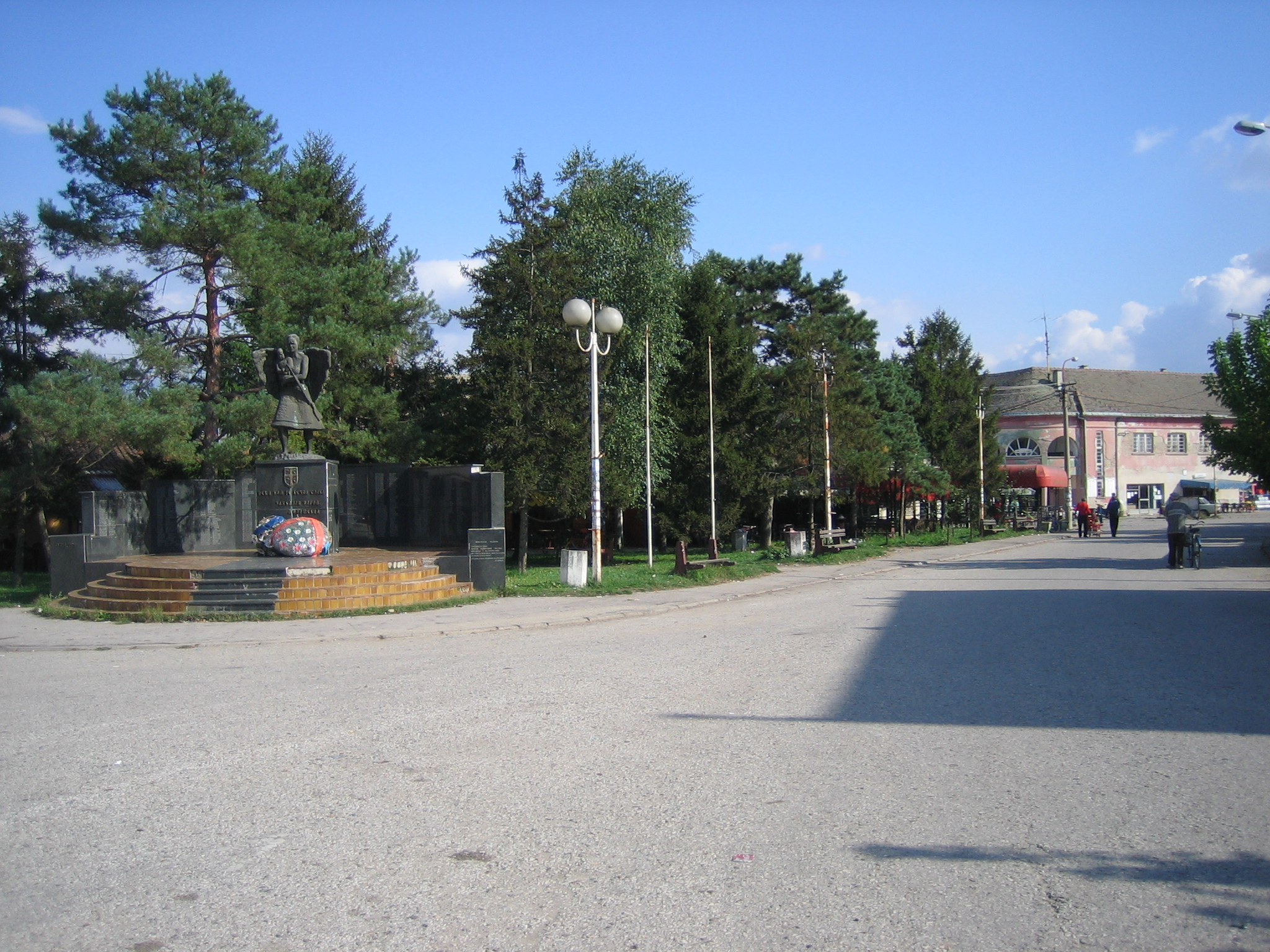

- Location within Serbia
- Coordinates: 44°26′03″N 21°06′36″E
- Country: Serbia
- District: Podunavlje District
- Municipality: Velika Plana

Population (2002)
  - Total: 3,426
- Time zone: UTC+1 (CET)
  - Summer (DST): UTC+2 (CEST)

Miloševac is a small town in the municipality of Velika Plana, Serbia. According to the 2002 census, the town has a population of 3426 people.
