= University of Belgrade Faculty of Law =

University faculty in Belgrade, Serbia

- Правни факултет Универзитета у Београду
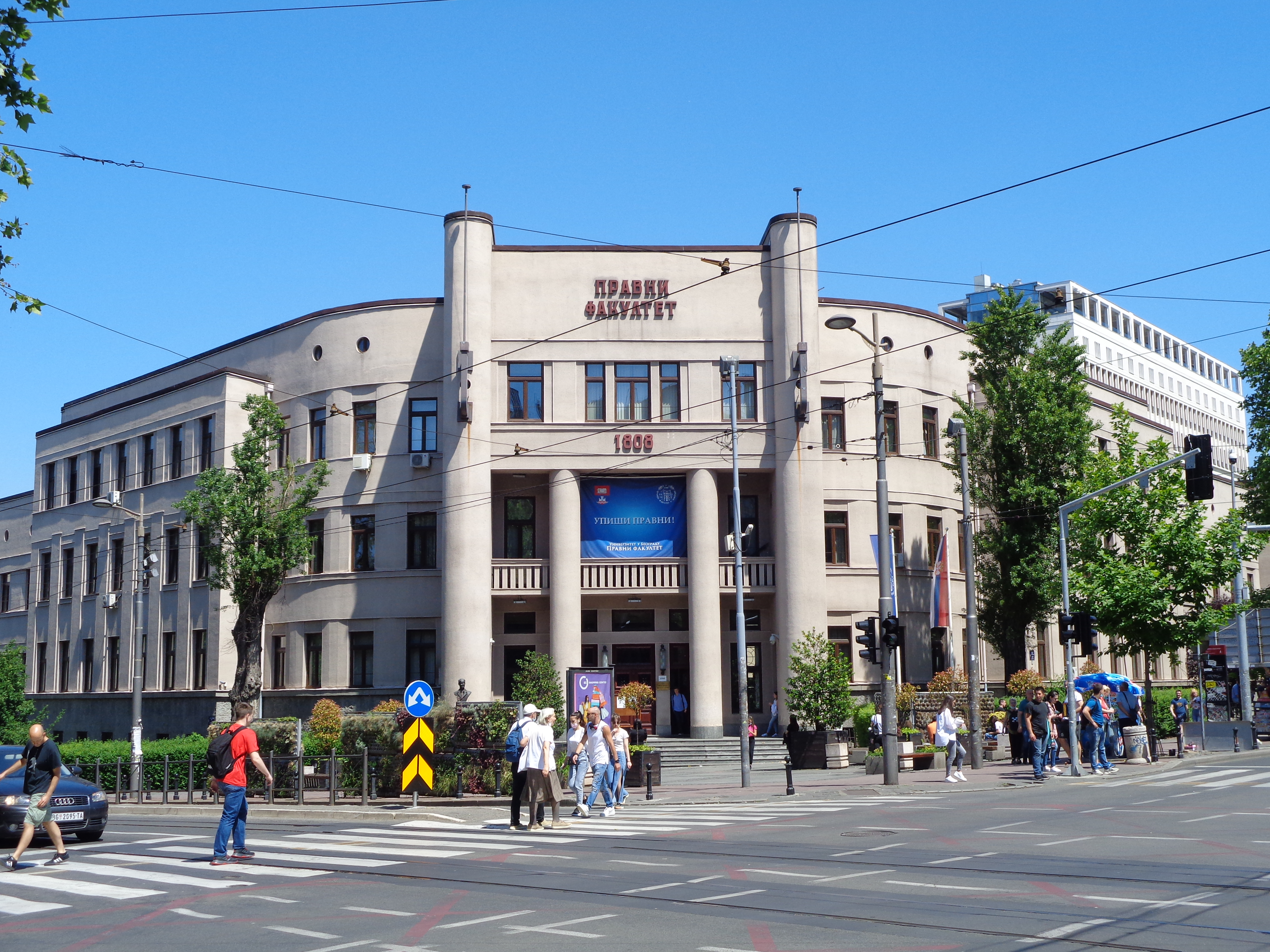
- The Faculty of Law building in June 2021.
- Type: Public
- Established: 1808; 218 years ago
- Dean: Bojan Milisavljević
- Faculty: 103 (2016)
- Students: 8,891 (2016)
- Undergraduates: 8,319 (2016)
- Postgraduates: 537 (2016)
- Doctoral students: 35 (2016)
- Location: Belgrade, Serbia; 44.807237°N 20.472090°E
- Campus: Urban
- Website: www.ius.bg.ac.rs/eng

The Faculty of Law of the University in Belgrade (Serbian: Правни факултет Универзитета у Београду/Pravni fakultet Univerziteta u Beogradu), also known as the Belgrade Law School, is one of the first-tier educational institutions of the University of Belgrade, Serbia. The building is located in the heart of the old part of Belgrade, in the urban neighborhood of Palilula, contiguously to the city park Tašmajdan, on Bulevar kralja Aleksandra.

== History ==
The Faculty of Law, established in 1808 as part of the University of Belgrade, is one of the largest law schools in the region, with a long tradition of being a leader in the country's legal education. In the beginning, the Countess Ljubica's Residence was home to this educational institution, which was at that time within the Belgrade Higher School. The law school has always rallied distinguished scholars and lecturers. Since its founding, it has educated almost 50,000 law graduates, around 1,200 magistri iuris and 830 doctores iuris, as well as hundreds of specialists in various areas. A great many Faculty of Law alumni have become recognized experts and scholars in all branches of law, law professors and high ranking government officials. Distinguished scholars include authorities, such as Slobodan Jovanović, Alexander Soloviev, Radomir Lukić, Mehmed Begović and Mihailo Đurić.

The faculty's historic building, built by US millionaire Mile Bjelivuk in 1937, was upgraded in 1995 with additional premises, and now comprises about 12,000 sq. meters of space. All the faculties of law, established subsequently in Serbia (Subotica Law School, University of Novi Sad Faculty of Law, Pristina Law School, Niš Law School, Kragujevac Law School), Montenegro (Podgorica Law School), and in other parts of the former Yugoslavia (Sarajevo Law School, Skoplje Law School) were formed from the University of Belgrade Faculty of Law as a core. There is many professors at the various faculties of law in all the countries of the former Yugoslavia, who had obtained their academic titles at the University of Belgrade Faculty of Law.

The faculty has been awarded fifteen Fulbright Fellowships to do legal research in the United States, the most of any law school in Southeastern Europe.

== The Faculty of Law ==
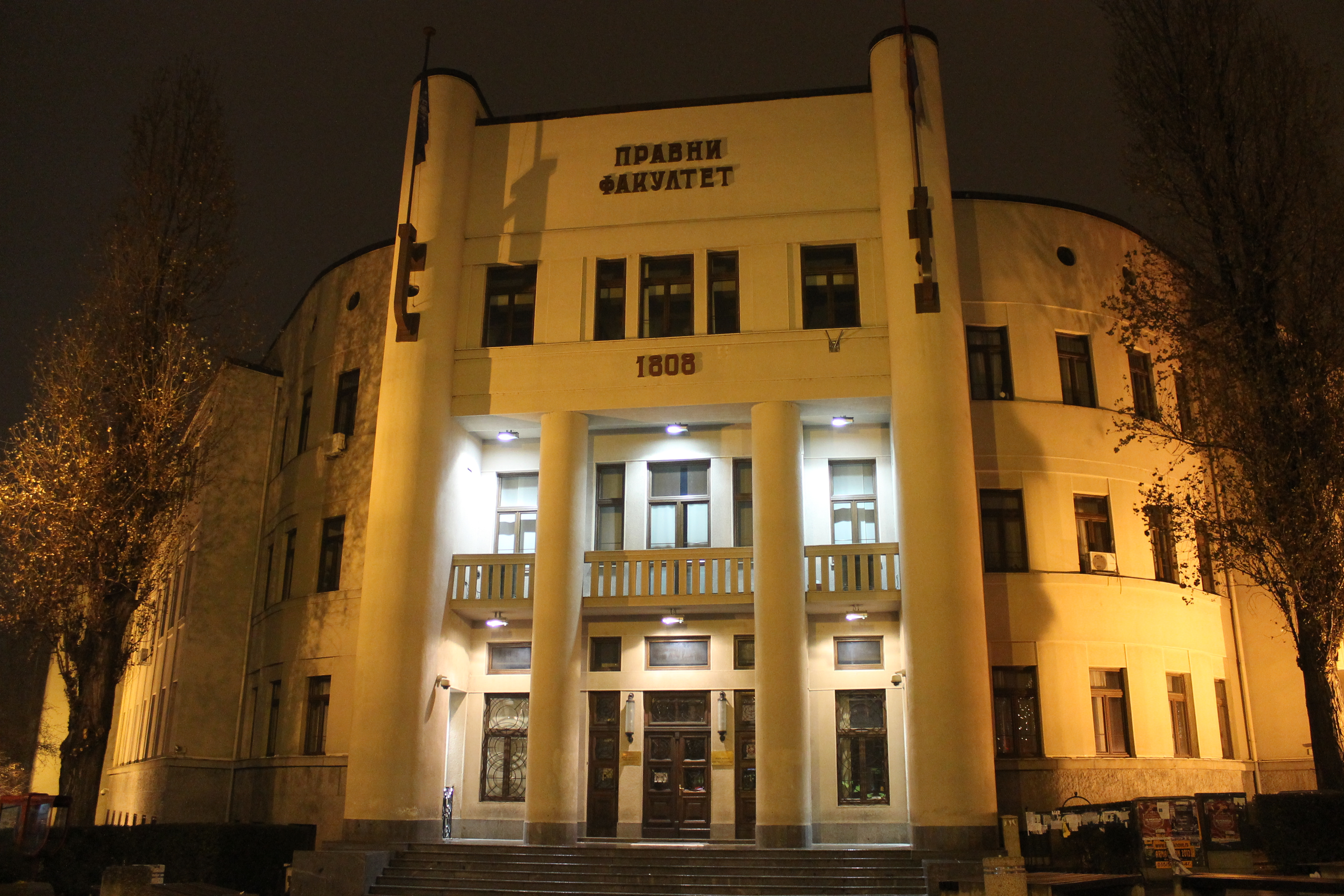
Belgrade Law School at night

=== Library ===
The academic law library in the region is located in the very faculty building, occupying the area of around 2,000 sq. meters, with 600 sq. meters of reading rooms, one of which is reserved for researchers and teachers only. The library collection comprises 138,000 monographs, 2,670 titles with 32,600 years of serial publications, reference collection with over 400 encyclopaedias, lexicons, dictionaries and other reference books, and a priceless collection of 91 rarities (featuring several 17th and 18th century editions of Justinian's Codification, a singular edition of Corpus Iuris Canonici, etc.).

=== Belgrade Law Review ===
Annals of the Faculty of Law in Belgrade – Belgrade Law Review
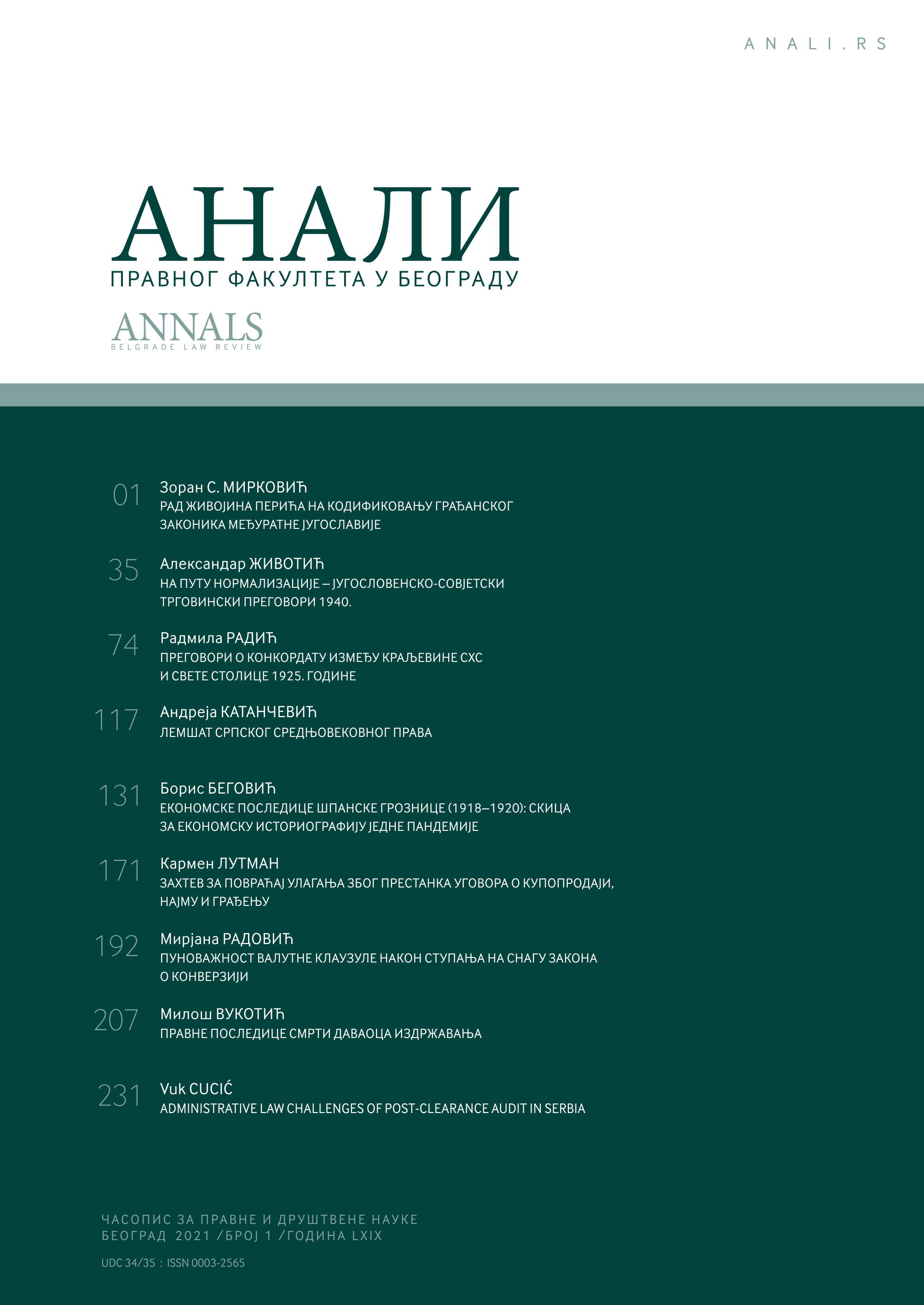
- Discipline: Law review
- Language: Serbian, English
- Edited by: Marija Karanikić Mirić

Publication details
- Former names: Archive for Legal and Social Sciences
- History: 1906–present
- Publisher: University of Belgrade Faculty of Law (Serbia)
- Frequency: Quarterly

Standard abbreviations
- ISO 4: Ann. Fac. Law Belgr.

Indexing
- ISSN: 0003-2565 (print); 2406-2693 (web)

Links
- Journal homepage

Annals of the Faculty of Law in Belgrade (Belgrade Law Review) is the oldest Southeastern European academic law journal, having been founded in 1906 as Archive for Legal and Social Sciences. The law review serves as a forum for the expression of the legal ideas. Editors-in-Chief of the Belgrade Law Review are professors Sima Avramovic and Alan Watson. In honor of Watson's worldwide scholarship, the Faculty of Law also established the Alan Watson Foundation.

=== Academic and professional gatherings ===
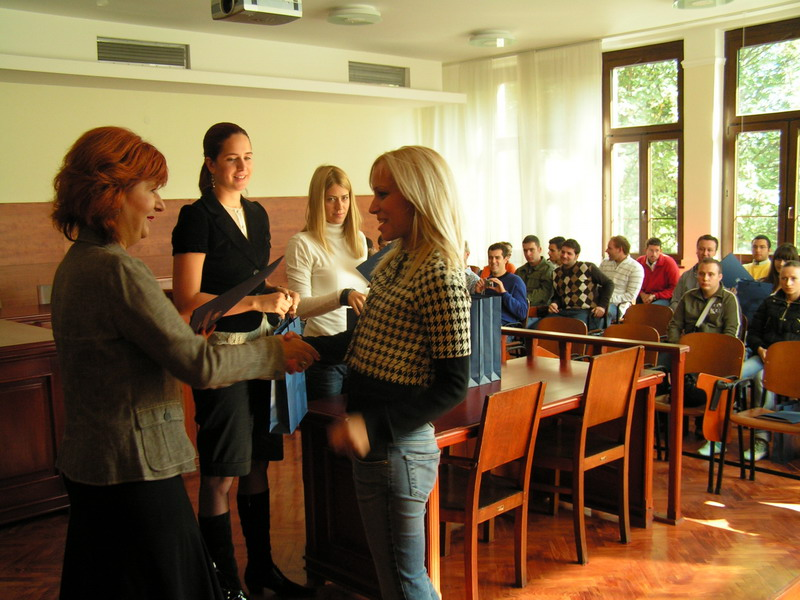
European Forum Alpbach at the Belgrade Law School

The faculty participates in numerous scholarly and professional events (both national and international) and regularly present their papers at conferences held annually by the national lawyers’ associations such as the Kopaonik School of Natural Law, the Commercial Lawyers' Convention, numerous criminal law symposia, etc.

=== Academic staff ===
The University of Belgrade Faculty of Law has among its faculty some of the most eminent experts in various legal disciplines, as well as in a range of other social sciences (economy, sociology, philosophy, political science, legal history, etc.) Amongst them, there have been 19 members of the Academies of Sciences, 15 presidents of the University of Belgrade, six judges of the Constitutional Court of Serbia, many names recognized within the domestic and international academic community, as well as several dozens of high government officials – Prime Ministers, Deputy Prime Ministers and Ministers, Ambassadors, etc. Miroljub Labus, Dejan Popović, Gašo Knežević and Kosta Čavoški are some of the current faculty.

=== Competition in Oratory ===
The traditional annual student Belgrade Competition in Oratory has become an event that attracts interest of the entire University and the general public. Following the example of the Faculty of Law in Belgrade, a number of other faculties organize their own competitions, the winners of which participate in the Serbian universities wide finals.

=== International competitions ===
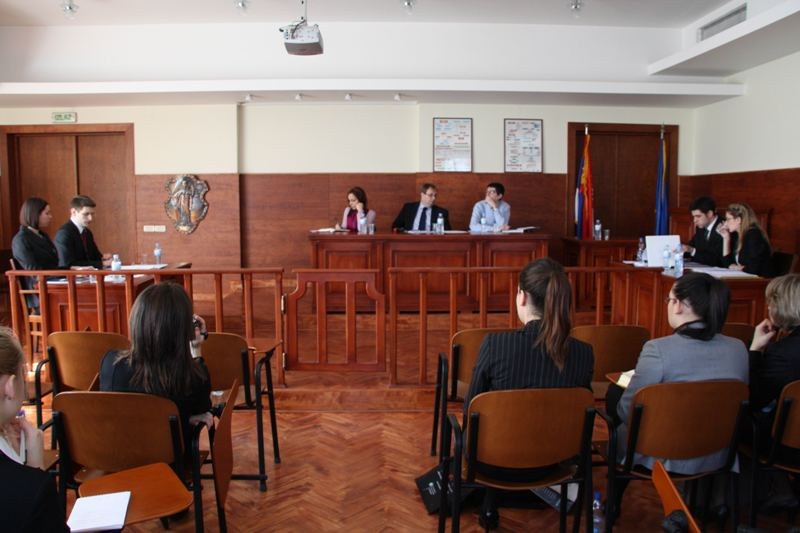
Moot Court room

Participating in inter-faculty competitions in different fields of practice at the national and international level is a great challenge to students. The student teams are coached by professors and teaching assistants, and they have achieved notable success in the past. Apart from national competitions in various fields, for a number of years the Faculty of Law has enabled its students to participate in international competitions, such as the William C. Vis International Commercial Arbitration Moot (in international commercial and arbitration Law), Philip C. Jessup International Law Moot Court Competition (in international public law), Jean Pictet International Humanitarian Law Moot (in international humanitarian law), Clinical Legal History Competition (simulation of a court proceeding in ancient Athens), etc. Regarding Willem C. Vis Moot, since 2008, University of Belgrade Faculty of Law hosts an annual pre-moot competition better known as Belgrade Open. In 2010, 22 teams from 16 countries participated. Actual pre-moot rounds of Belgrade Open are, since 2009, preceded by an arbitration conference dealing with issues which were brought upon in that year's moot problem. In 2011, the University of Belgrade Faculty of Law team triumphed at the Monroe E. Price International Media Law Moot Court Competition at the University of Oxford.

=== Student life ===
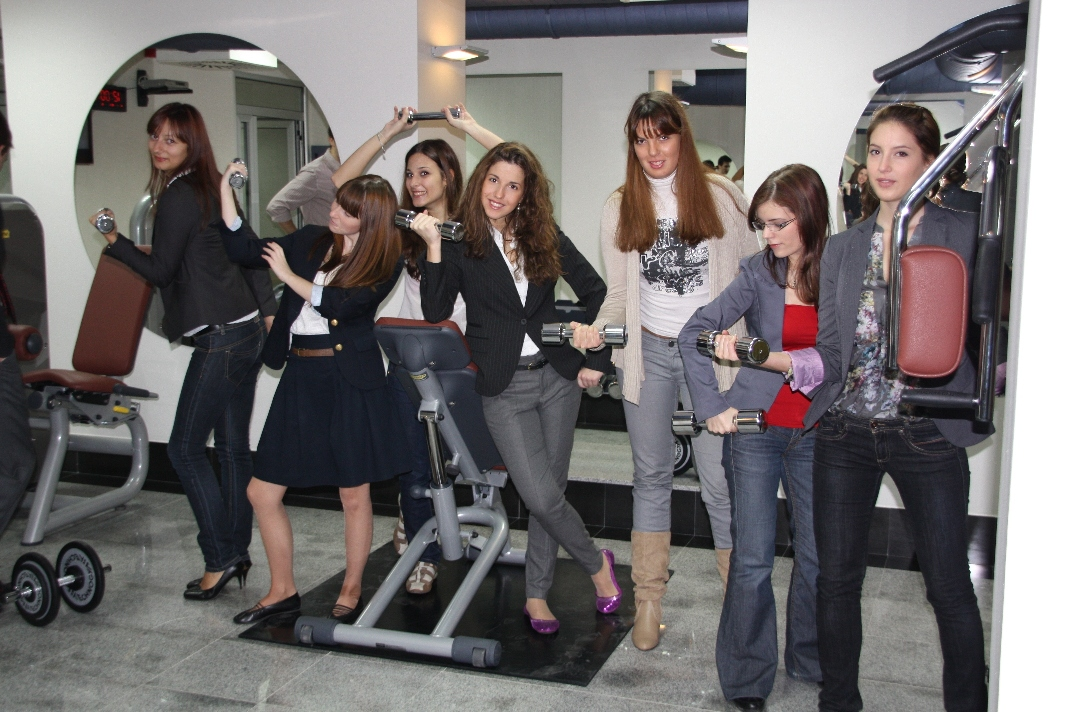
Gym at the Belgrade Law School

Student life at the faculty does not merely revolve around lectures and exams, as there is a diverse array of student activities. There are many student organisations, of which Belgrade chapter of The European Law Students' Association, is one of the most active ones, organizing student exchange programmes throughout Europe. Students elect their representatives (Student Vice-Dean and the Student Parliament) to coordinate various student activities, represent their interests in the faculty bodies, participate in the evaluation of studies and the faculty, and secure the involvement and participation of students in all matters and issues of interest to them.

Students publish their own journal – Pravnik (The Lawyer), take part in various competitions through their sports club Pravnik, stage plays through a drama society, organize discussion forums through the long lasting UN Club, whereas Oratory Centre Institutio oratoria gathers all those interested in developing public speaking skills and prepares them for competitions. The Society for Roman Law and Classics Forum Romanum has a particularly long and fine tradition. Established in 1970, it organizes discussion forums and social activities on a weekly basis. Over the years dozens of internationally renowned professors have participated in its activities, e.g. the late Regius Professor of Civil Law Peter Birks from Oxford.

== Degree programs ==
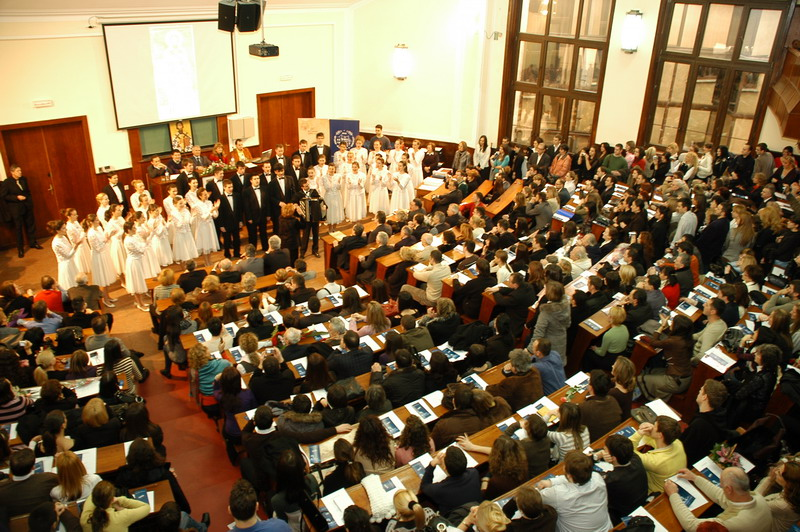
Inauguration of a new academic year

The law school practices a two-cycle system of studies: the first lasts four years (undergraduate studies) and the second lasts one year (Master studies). The undergraduate studies include mandatory courses, a selection of four major streams of study – judicial-administrative, business law, legal theory and international law as well as a number of elective courses which students can choose according to their personal interests and preferences. The Master studies encompass two basic programs – business law and administrative-judicial programs, as well as many so-called open Master programs in various areas. The law school has adopted and complies to the European Credit Transfer and Accumulation System.

In order to meet the challenge of serving a great number of students and maintaining high academic standards at the same time, a wide area of teaching methods are being used, ranging from lectures, seminars, study and advanced study groups (similar to honors classes in the U.S.), to mentor work and various other modern methods of teaching. Also, for the purpose of gaining practical skills, the law school organizes training courses, courses in legal writing, internships, the legal clinic, moot courts, and similar.

Master and doctoral studies include degree programs in: legal theory, legal history, civil law, criminal law, business law, corporate law, international commercial law, intellectual property, public international law, labor law, social security law, administrative law, and public administration, constitutional law and political systems, legal and economic studies, legal and social studies, European Union law.

=== English graduate programs ===
The graduate academic program Master in European Integration is taught entirely in English for both international and Serbian students. The program is worth 60 ECTS. Students having a bachelor's degree in law or social sciences-humanities are eligible to apply.

Slobodan Milošević, President of Serbia (1989–1997) and President of FR Yugoslavia (1997–2000)

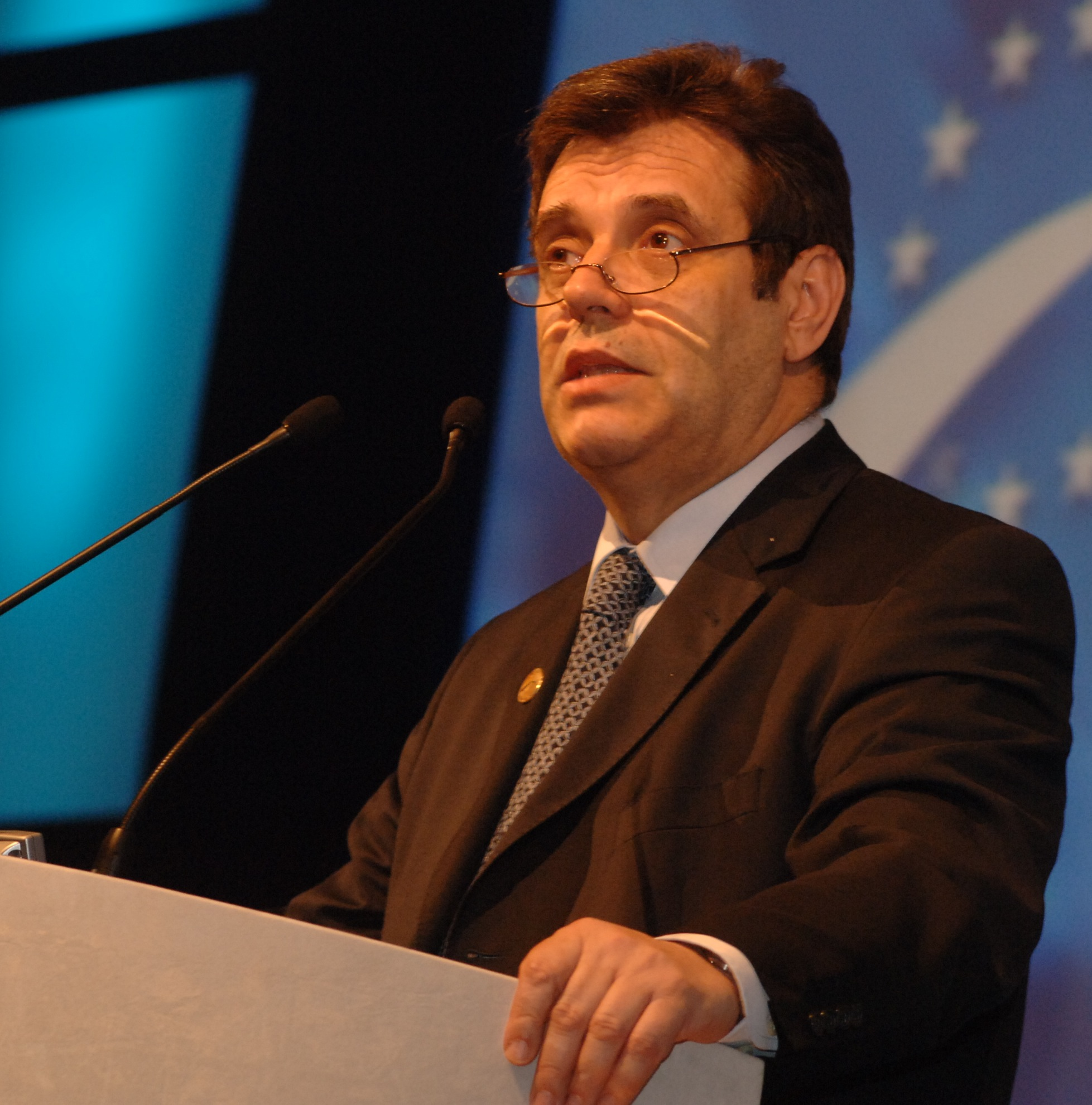
Vojislav Koštunica, President of Yugoslavia (2000–2003) and Prime Minister of Serbia (2004–2008)

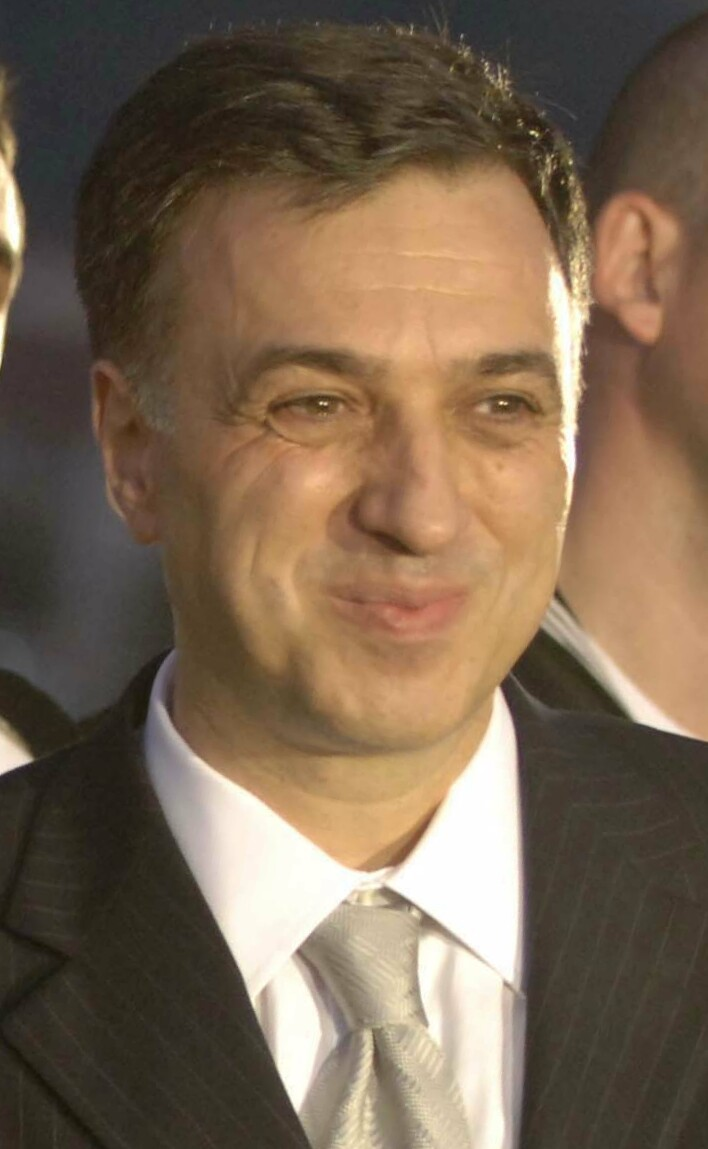
Filip Vujanović, President of Montenegro (2003–2018)

== Notable alumni ==
- Vladan Batić, Serbian Minister of Justice (2000–2003) and president of the Christian Democratic Party of Serbia (1997–2010)
- Džemal Bijedić, President of the Federal Executive Council in SFR Yugoslavia (1971–1977)
- Vuk Drašković, Serbian Minister of Foreign Affairs (2004–2007) and president of the Serbian Renewal Movement (1990–present)
- Gorica Gajević (born 1958), General Secretary of the Socialist Party of Serbia, 1996–2000
- Kiro Gligorov, President of the Republic of Macedonia (1991–1999)
- Zdravko Grebo, law professor at the University of Sarajevo and founder of the Open Society Foundation of Bosnia & Herzegovina
- Vilim Herman, Croatian politician and law professor at the University of Osijek
- Miroljub Jevtić, Serbian political scientist
- Dragan Jočić, Serbian Minister of the Interior (2004–2008)
- Nebojša Kaluđerović, Montenegrin Ambassador to the United Nations (2006–2010)
- Vojislav Koštunica, President of FR Yugoslavia (2000–2003) and Serbian Prime Minister (2004–2008)
- Ranko Krivokapić, President of the Parliament of Montenegro (2003–2016), Minister of Foreign Affairs (2022–)
- Laza Lazarević, Serbian writer and psychiatrist
- Dimitrije Ljotić, Yugoslav Minister of Justice (1931-1931) and German collaborationist during World War II
- Snežana Malović, Serbian Minister of Justice (2008–2012)
- Slobodan Milošević, President of Serbia (1989–1997) and President of FR Yugoslavia (1997–2000)
- Lazar Mojsov, President of the United Nations General Assembly (1977–1978) and President of Presidency of SFR Yugoslavia (1987–1988)
- Đurđe Ninković, founding member of the Democratic Party (DS), Serbian Deputy Minister of Justice (2001)
- Branislav Nušić, Serbian novelist, satirist, essayist and founder of modern rhetoric in Serbia
- Milan Parivodić, Serbian Minister of International Economic Relations (2004–2006)
- Fredy Perlman, American author, publisher and activist and Professor at Western Michigan University
- Dušan Petrović, Serbian Minister of Justice (2007–2008) and vice-president of the Democratic Party (2004–2013)
- Vida Petrović-Škero, President of the Supreme Court of the Republic of Serbia (2005–2009)
- Milan St. Protić, Serbian Ambassador to the United States and Mayor of Belgrade (2000–2001)
- Ivo Lola Ribar, Croatian communist politician in Yugoslavia
- Nikola Selaković, Serbian Minister of Justice (2012–2016) Minister of Foreign Affairs (2020–)
- Vojislav Šešelj, president of the Serbian Radical Party (SRS)
- Ivan Stambolić, President of the Presidency of Serbia (1985–1987) and President of the Executive Council of Serbia (1978–1982)
- Borisav Stanković, Serbian realist writer
- Vlajko Stojiljković, Serbian Minister of the Interior (1997–2000)
- Zoran Stojković, Serbian Minister of Justice (2004–2007)
- Goran Svilanović, Yugoslav Foreign Minister (2000–2004) and president of the Civic Alliance of Serbia (1999–2004)
- Ljubomir Tadić, Professor of Philosophy and Member of the Serbian Academy of Sciences and Arts
- Dimitrije Tucović, Yugoslav social democrat
- Danilo Türk, Slovenian President (2007–2012)
- Velibor Vasović, Serbian footballer
- Marko Vidojković, Serbian novelist of a younger generation
- Miodrag Vlahović, Montenegrin Minister of Foreign Affairs (2004–2006) and Montenegrin Ambassador to the United States (2006–present)
- Aleksandar Vučić, President of Serbia (2017-), former Prime Minister of Serbia ( 2014–2017) and president of the Serbian Progressive Party
- Filip Vujanović, President of Montenegro (2003–2018) and Prime Minister of Montenegro (1998–2002)
- Svetozar Vukmanović-Tempo, Josip Broz Tito's personal representative and Member of the Central Committee of the Communist Party of Yugoslavia
