= Belgrade City Administration =

1839–1944 administrative-security institution in Belgrade

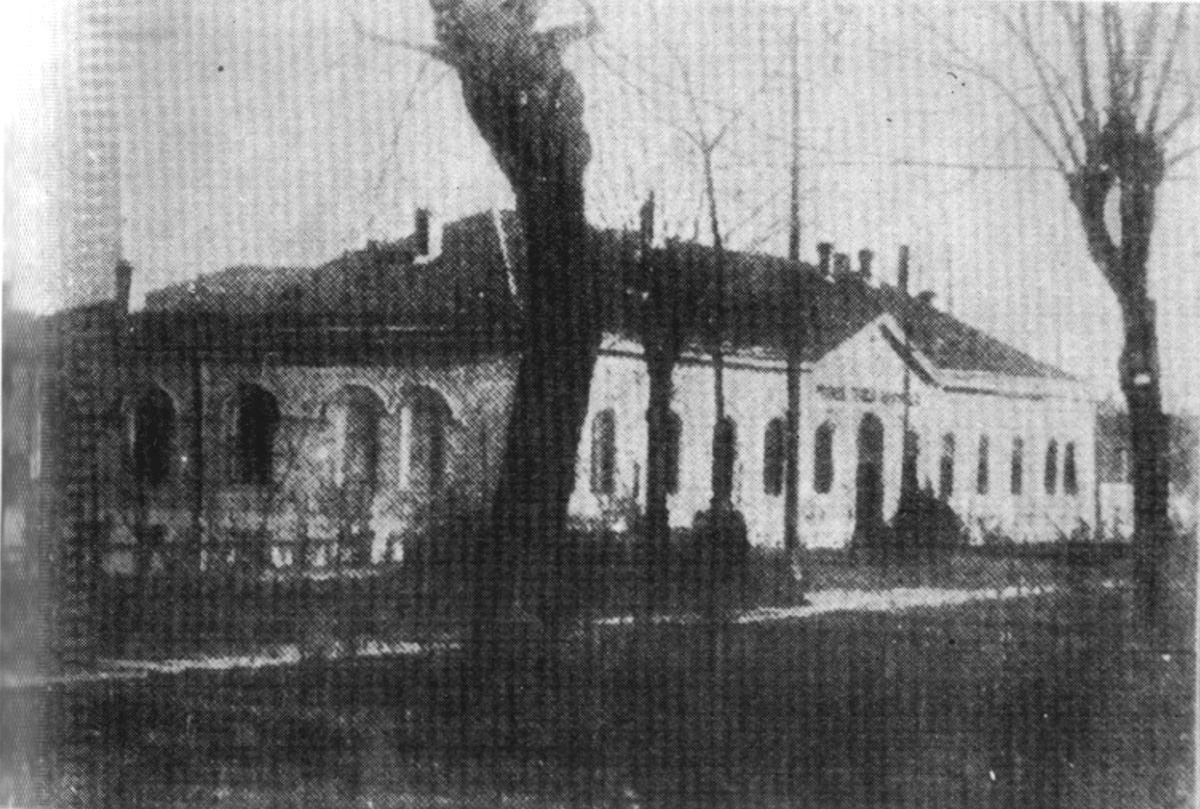
Glavnjača prison, headquarters of the Belgrade City Administration, 1930s

Belgrade City Administration (Serbian: Управа града Београда, romanized: Uprava grada Beograda) was an administrative and security institution in Belgrade from 1839 to 1944. For most of that time, its headquarters was located in the notorious Glavnjača prison, on the present-day site of the University of Belgrade Faculty of Chemistry, on Students Square.

From the mid-19th century until the mid-20th century, Belgrade was governed by two levels of authority — the Belgrade City Administration, as the holder of police and administrative state authority, and the Belgrade City Municipality, as the holder of the local self-government. In 1944, the Belgrade City Administration was abolished after a different administrative organization was established in Belgrade.

== Kingdom of Yugoslavia ==
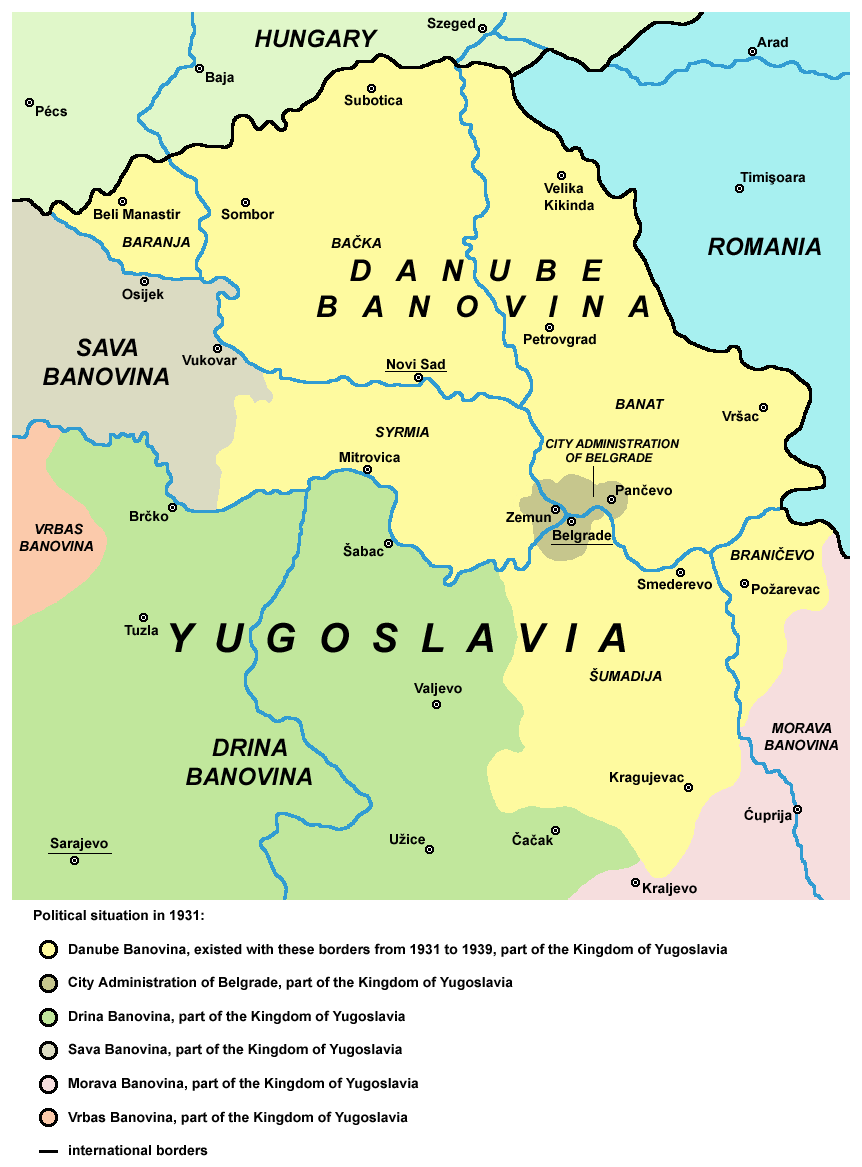
Belgrade City Administration in the Kingdom of Yugoslavia in 1931

When the Kingdom of Yugoslavia was divided into banovinas in 1929, a separate administrative and territorial unit called the Belgrade City Administration was formed, encompassing the City of Belgrade with surrounding area, including Zemun and Pančevo. This territory was entirely surrounded by the Danube Banovina, which had its administrative seat in Novi Sad. Following the Axis invasion, occupation and partition of Yugoslavia in 1941, the Belgrade City Administration continued to exist as an administrative and territorial unit of the Territory of the Military Commander in Serbia until the end of 1941, when Serbia was divided into districts in a new territorial organization.

== Administrators ==
Portrait	Name	Tenure	Notes
	Jovan German	13 July 1839 – 22 November 1839	
	Ilija Čarapić	22 November 1839 – 27 May 1840	Son of Vasa Čarapić
	Miloš Bogićević	27 May 1840 – 24 September 1840	
	Mladen M. Žujović	24 September 1840 – 6 August 1842 and 1858	
	Mihailo Ljotić	29 August 1842 – 22 September 1842	
	Tenka Stefanović	22 September 1842 – 6 November 1842	
	Radovan Damjanović	6 November 1842 – 20 December 1844	
	Jovan Vučković	20 December 1844 – 22 July 1848	
	Gavrilo Jeremić	22 July 1848 – 27 September 1852	
	Kosta Magazinović	27 September 1852 – 15 November 1855	
	Milivoje Petrović Blaznavac	15 November 1855 – 18 October 1856	
	Nikola Hristić	18 October 1856 – 11 February 1859 and 27 September 1859 – 7 October 1860	
	Jovan Belimarković	30 November 1858 – 11 February 1859	
	Jovan Dimitrijević Mitričević	11 February 1859 – 27 September 1859	
	Dragutin Žabarac	27 September 1859 – 19 January 1861	
	Mihailo Barlovac	19 January 1861 – 18 July 1868	
	Jakov Tucaković	1 August 1868 – 4 April 1873 and 1 June 1876 – 1 June 1878	
	Živojin Blaznavac	4 April 1873 – 13 February 1874 and 25 February 1879 – 17 March 1887	
	Dimitrije Joksić	13 February 1874 – 22 October 1875 and 22 October 1875 – 1 June 1876	Acting
	Jovan Avakumović	22 October 1875 – 1 June 1876	
	Janko Terzić	1877 – 4 February 1878	
	Jakov Brzaković	4 February 1878 – 1 June 1878	
	Panta Lunjevica	1 June 1878 – 25 February 1879	Son of Nikola Lunjevica; father of Queen Draga and Nikodije Lunjevica
	Živko Anđelić	17 March 1887 – 6 June 1888	
	Gliša Đorđević	6 June 1888 – 16 September 1889	
	Vladimir Milenković	1889 and 1892	
	Velimir Todorović	16 September 1889 – 13 January 1890	
	Svetozar Arsenović	13 January 1890 – 11 May 1891	
	Mihailo P. Jovanović	27 May 1891 – 1 August 1892	
	Pavle Denić	1 August 1892 – 2 April 1893	
	Stojan Protić	2 April 1893 – 7 April 1893	
	Đorđe Nestorović	7 April 1893 – 12 January 1894	
	Miloš Mihailović	12 January 1894 – 24 May 1894	
	Živko Kasidolac	24 May 1894 – 29 October 1894	
	Aleksa Stevanović	29 October 1894 – 1 August 1895	
	Nikola Stevanović	1 August 1895 – 20 April 1896	
	Rista Bademlić	20 April 1896 – 14 July 1900	
	Božidar Maršićanin	13 July 1900 – 29 May 1903	Deposed in the May Coup
	Bogdan Damjanović	29 May 1903 – 24 June 1903	
	Dušan Vujić	24 June 1903 – 25 October 1903	
	Mihailo Cerović	25 October 1903 – 20 January 1905 and 16 March 1906 – 19 July 1907	
	Mihailo Rašković	20 January 1905 – 14 August 1905	
	Dragić Pavlović	14 August 1905 – 21 January 1906	
	Branimir Rajić	21 January 1906 – 15 March 1906	
	Dragutin Milićević	19 September 1907 – 22 April 1908	
	Obrad Blagojević	22 April 1908 – 27 September 1908	
	Dušan Alimpić	22 September 1908 – 10 May 1910	
	Gojko Pavlović	10 May 1910 – 4 September 1912	
	Manojlo Lazarević	4 August 1912 – 9 September 1918 and 24 September 1919 – 27 December 1934	
	Kosta Tucaković	9 September 1918 – 24 September 1919	
	Dušan Filipović	27 December 1934 – 13 October 1935	
	Milan Aćimović	13 October 1935 – 21 December 1938	
	Živojin Simonović	9 February 1939 – 20 April 1939	
	Dragoslav Lazić	1 March 1939 – 1 April 1940	
	Dragomir Drinčić	28 March 1940 – 27 March 1941	Deposed in the Yugoslav coup d'état
	Milutin Stefanović	27 March 1941 – 1 April 1941	
	Dušan Ribar	1 April 1941 – 12 April 1941	
	Dragomir Jovanović	7 May 1941 – 5 October 1944	Served under the Government of National Salvation; fled amidst the Belgrade offensive

== See also ==
- Mayor of Belgrade

== Sources ==
- (in Serbian) Branislav Božović. Uprava i upravnici grada Beograda 1839–1944 — Prosveta 2011. 414 pages. ISBN 978-86-07-01910-6. COBISS 176630540
