= Lunjevica (surname) =

Lunjevica (Serbian Cyrillic: Луњевица) is a Serbian surname, derived from the village in central Serbia with the same name (Lunjevica). It may refer to:

- Nikola Lunjevica (1776–1842), Serbian Revolutionary
- Panta Lunjevica (1840–1887), Serbian politician
- Draga Mašin née Lunjevica (1864–1903), Queen consort of Serbia
