= Panta Lunjevica =

Serbian politician (1840–1887)

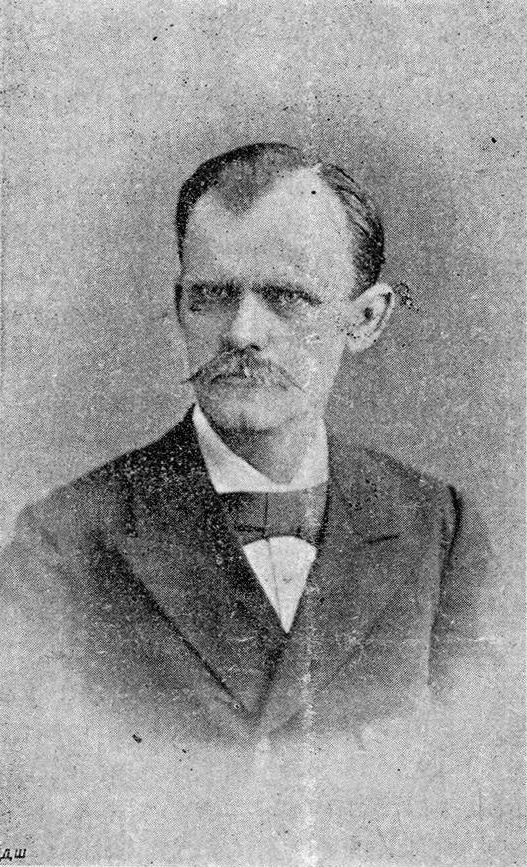
Photo of Panta Milićević Lunjevica, father of Queen Draga

Pantelija Panta Milićević Lunjevica (Serbian Cyrillic: Пантелија Панта Милићевић Луњевица; 1840–1887) was a Serbian higher administrative officer, the chief (načelnik) of the Šabac district (srez or okrug), and chief (načelnik) of the Belgrade district. He is better known as the father of Draga Mašin, Queen of Serbia.

== Biography ==
He was educated, formerly working as a military officer and policeman. He was a loyal to the Obrenović dynasty and a liberal. Panta was the son of Nikola Lunjevica (1776–1842), a blood-relative of Princess Ljubica, a commander (vojvoda) of the Serbian Revolution and close comrade of Prince Miloš. Nikola's wife, Panta's mother was Đurđija Čarapić (1804-1882), the daughter of Tanasije Čarapić and his wife Ivana Čarapić, who herself was a cousin of Karađorđe's wife Jelena. Đurđija was also the niece of Vasa Čarapić and first cousin of his son, Vojvoda Ilija Čarapić (d. 1844), first modern Mayor of Belgrade, who was married to Stamenka Karađorđević (1799-1875) the fourth daughter of Karađorđe Petrović, Grand Vožd of Serbia. With the financial held of his mother, Panta renovated the Vujan Monastery in 1858, which had earlier been renovated by his father in 1800 and later became burial place of almost all members of the Lunjevica family, except for Queen Draga, who is buried in St. Mark's Church, Belgrade. He also founded the library in Aranđelovac. With his wife Anđelija Anđa Koljević, the daughter of the President of the Municipality of Čačak, he had seven children; two sons, Nikola and Nikodije, and five daughters, Hristina, Đina, Ana, Draga and Vojka. Draga was the Queen consort of Serbia (1900–1903) as the wife of King Aleksandar Obrenović. Panta's wife Anđelija was a dipsomaniac, while in 1887, Panta himself died in a psychiatric institution. After the May Coup in 1903 where their sister and both brothers were killed, all surviving sisters of the Lunjevica family, namely Đurđina, Vojka and Hristina, left the country, now ruled by the Karađorđević dynasty, and settled permanently in Switzerland with their families.

== Gallery ==
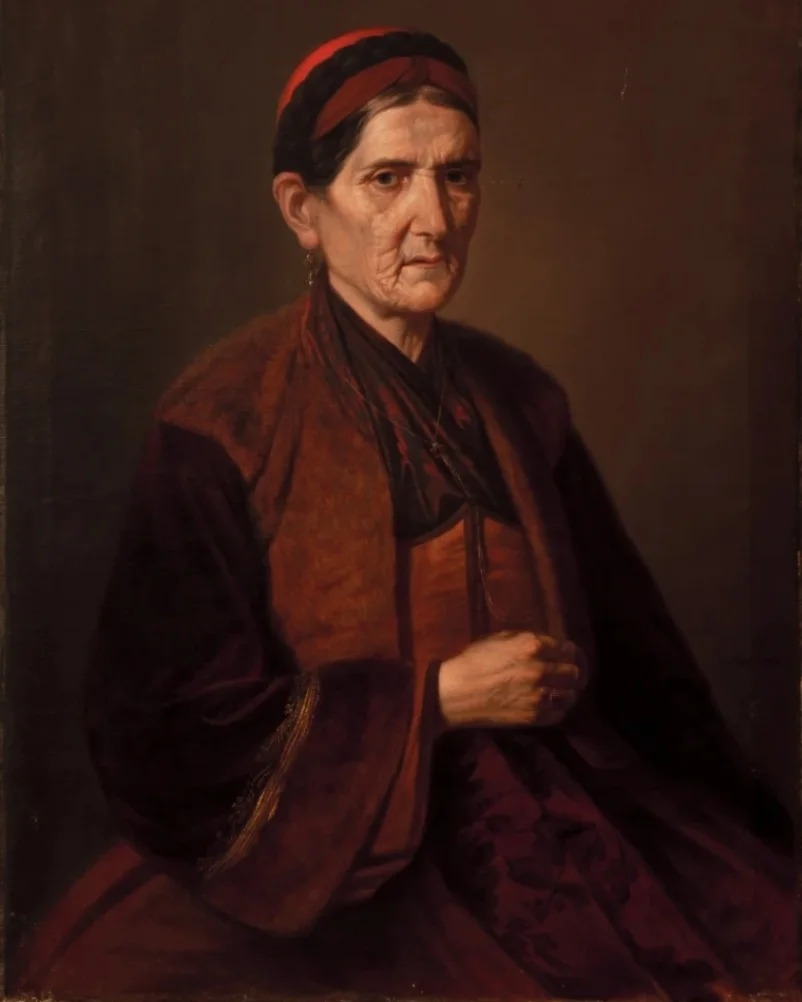
Panta's mother, Djurdjija Lunjevica (née Čarapić) (1804-1881), the daughter of Tanasije Čarapić

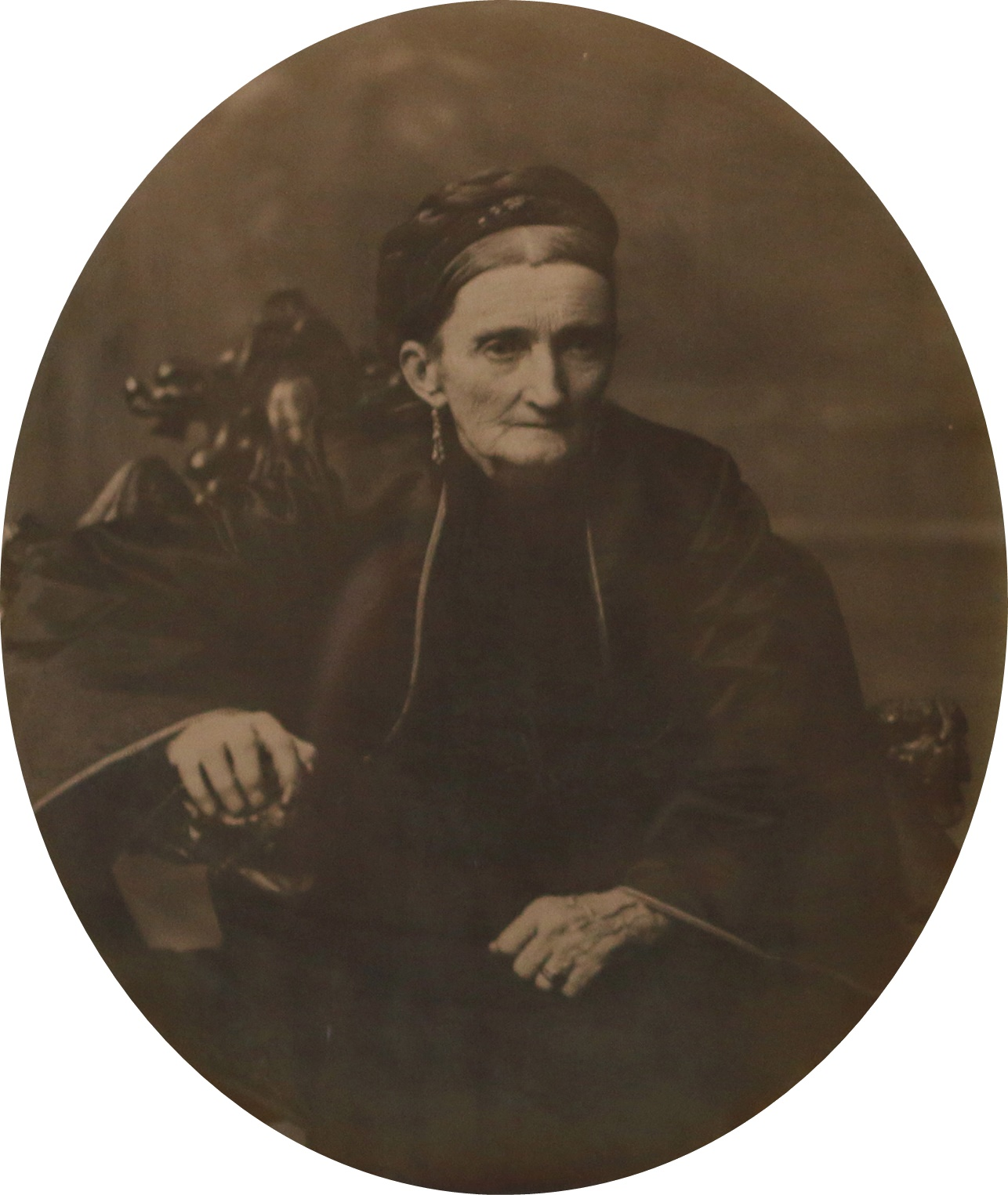
Panta's sister: Jelena Lena Pavlović, née Lunjevica (1832-1913), mother of Ivan S. Pavlović, Divisional general of Royal Yugoslav Army.

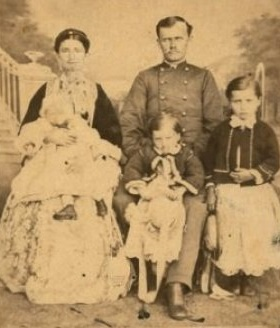
Panta and his wife, Andjelija with children

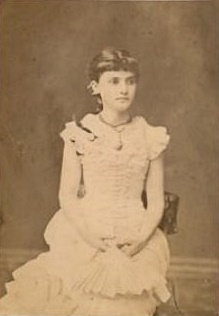
Queen Draga as a girl

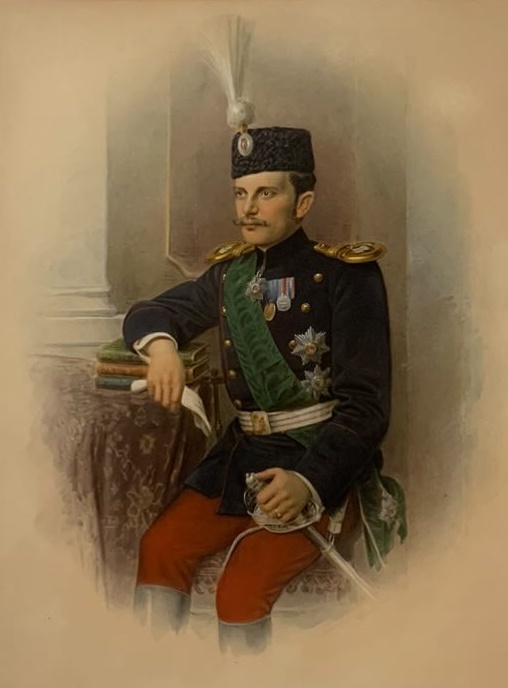
Panta's son, Nikola Lunjevica

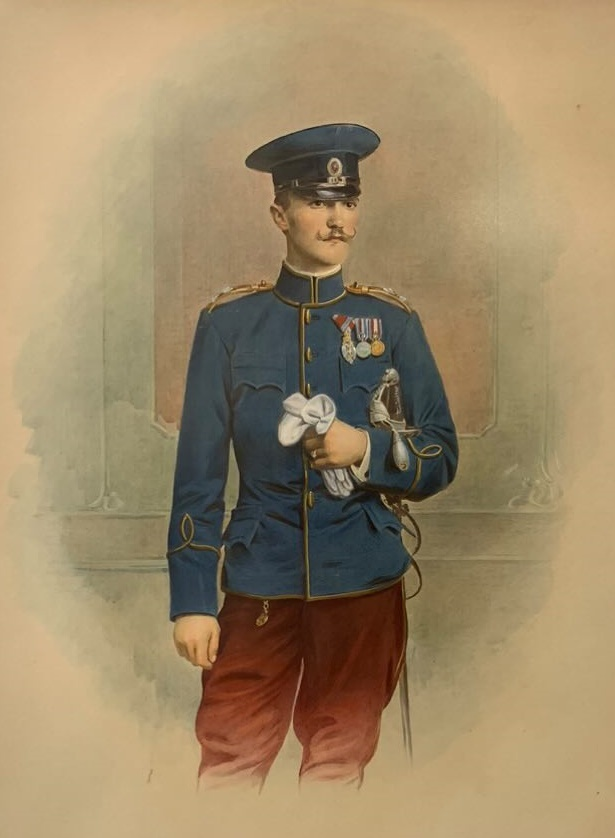
Panta's son, Nikodije Lunjevica

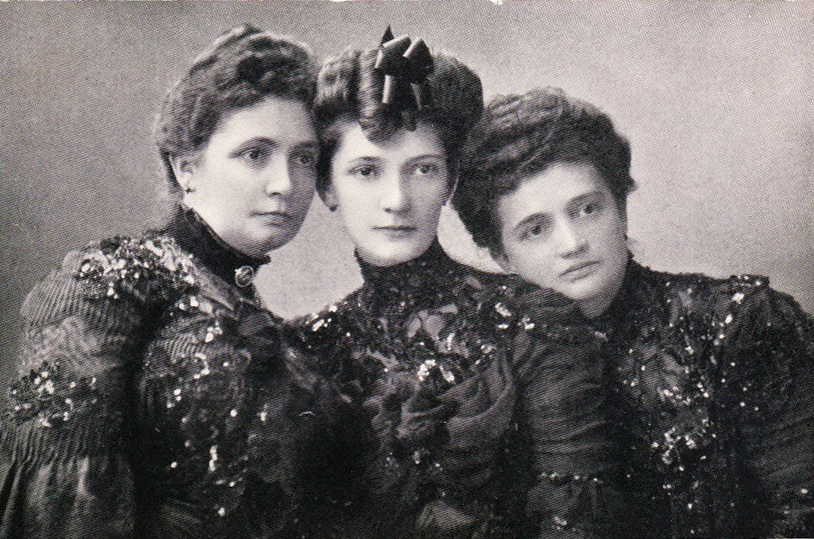
Panta's daughters: Hristina, Vojka and Djurdjina

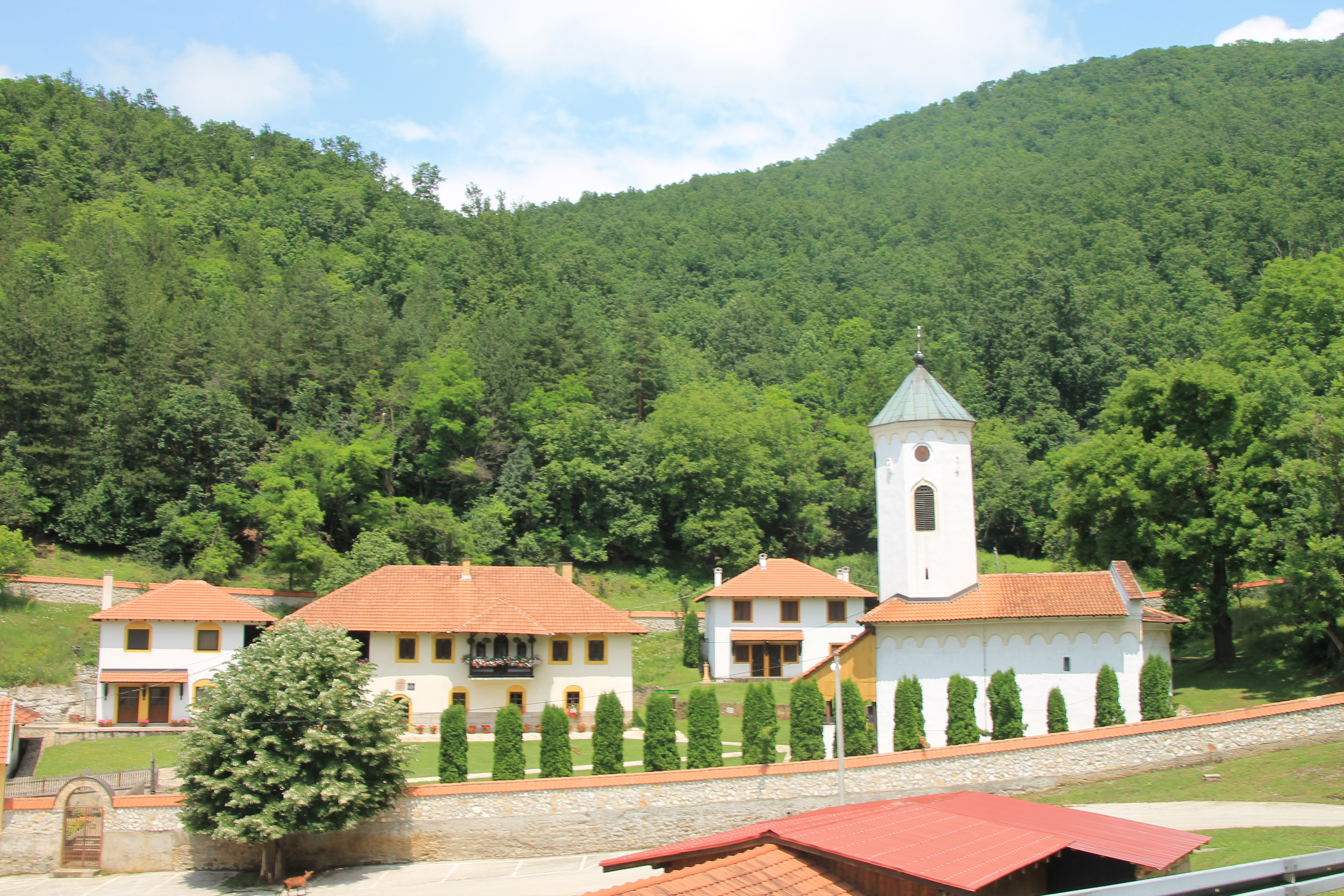
Vujan Monastery, burial place of Lunjevica family

== Sources ==
- Jovanović, Slobodan (1926). Влада Милана Обреновића, од Слободана Јовановића ... Издавачка књижарница Г. Кона.
- Malenić, Milivoj J. (1901). Posle četrdeset godina: u spomen proslave četrdesetogodišnjice Sv. Andrejske velike narodne skupštine. U Drž. štamp. Kralj. Srbije.
- Schreiber, Georg (1971). Balkan aus erster Hand. Geschichte u. Gegenwart in Berichten von Augenzeugen u. Zeitgenossen. Arena-Verlag.
- Stoimirović, Milan Jovanović (1971). Siluete starog Beograda. I. Jovanović-Stojimirović.
