= Ivan S. Pavlović =

Serbian general

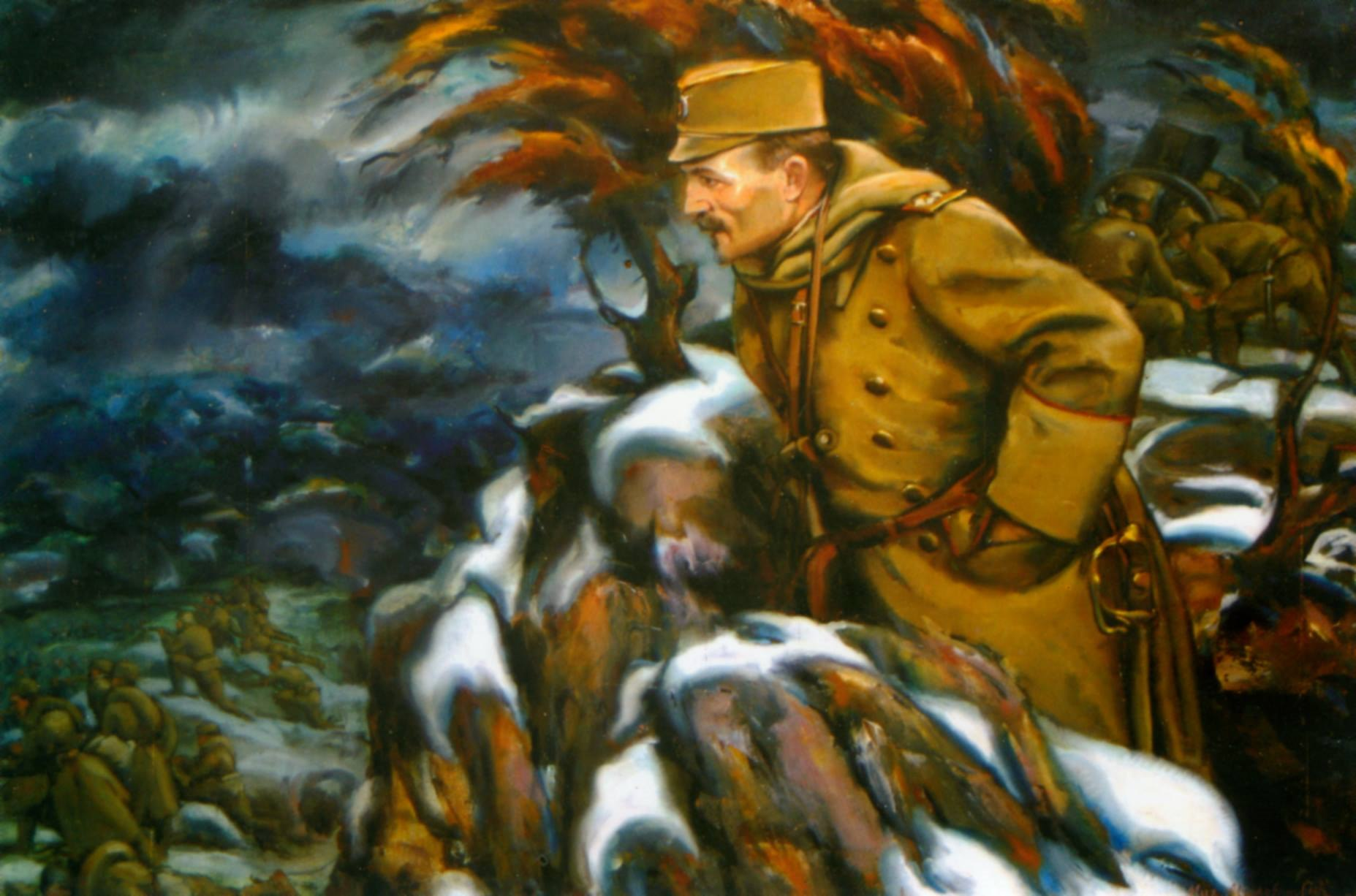
"Ivan Pavlović, offensive at Krstac" on 22 November 1914, as part of the Battle of Kolubara, painted by Mihailo Milovanović

Ivan S. Pavlović (Serbian Cyrillic: Иван С. Павловић; Užice, Principality of Serbia, 1869 - Belgrade, Kingdom of Yugoslavia, 1942) was a highly distinguished Serbian officer of the Serbian Army in World War I. He was the commander of the Army of the West, centered in Užice. After the war he was divisional general of Yugoslav army.

== Biography ==
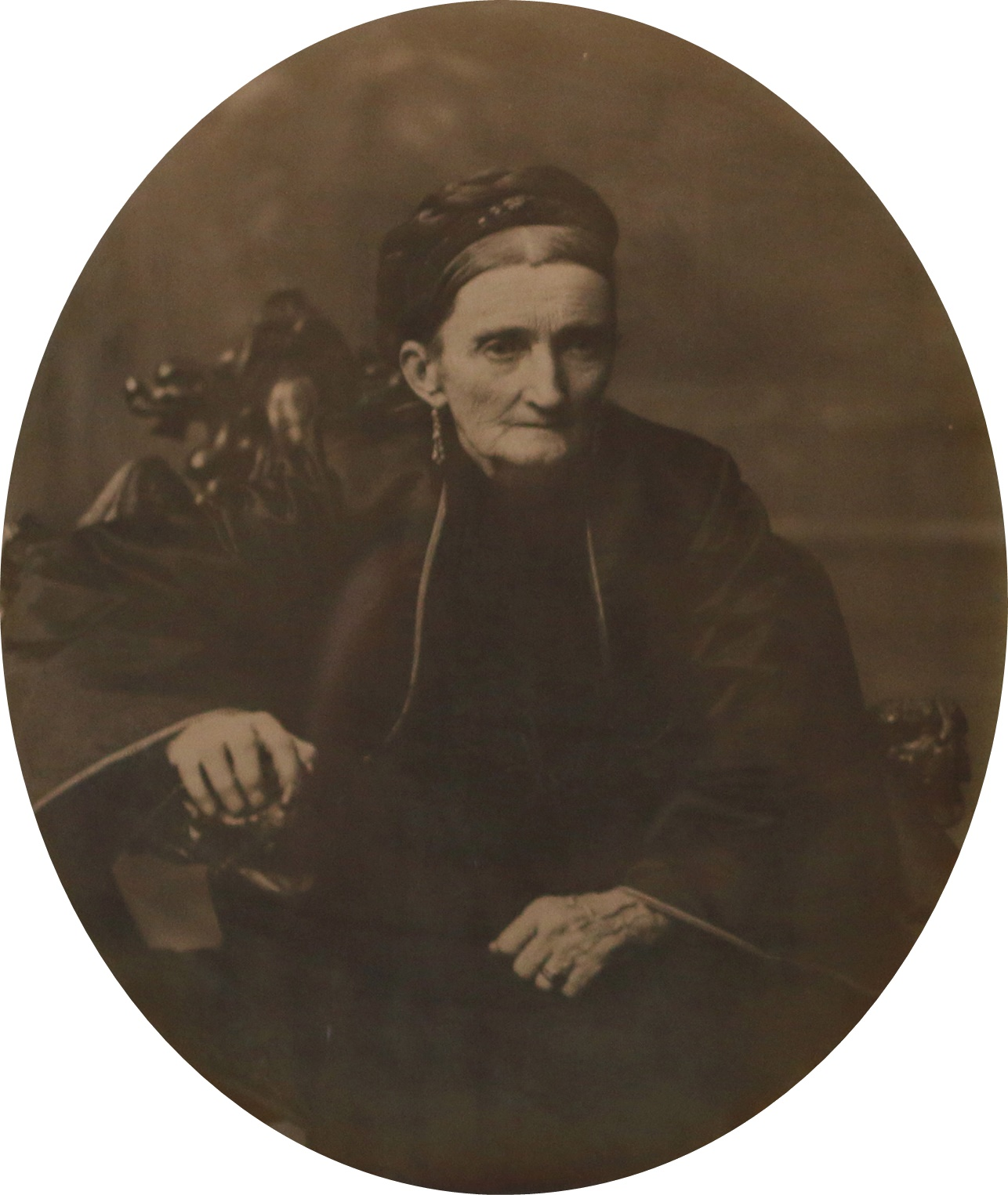
Ivan's mother: Jelena Lena Pavlović, née Lunjevica (1832-1913), the daughter of Nikola Lunjevica by his fourth wife, Đurđija Čarapić (1804-1882), an aunt of Queen Draga of Serbia

Ivan Pavlović was born in 1869 in the Principality of Serbia in the town of Užice, where he graduated from elementary and secondary schools before enrolling and graduating from the Military Academy in Belgrade. His father Stojko Pavlović was a Serbian cavalry lieutenant, and his mother Jelena Lena Lunjevica (1832-1913) was the daughter of Nikola Lunjevica by his fourth wife, Djurdjija Čarapić (1804-1881), herself the daughter of Voivode Tanasije Čarapić and a member of the prominent Serbian Čarapić family.

Pavlović was promoted to the rank of divisional general in 1919 for mounting a successful offensive at Krstac in 1914. When the Serbian troops retreated through the Albanians mountains in the middle of the winter of 1915-1916, Pavlović and his detachment covered the pass through the strait of Ibar river and Montenegro and afterwards he provided shelter and food for the fatigued soldiers who survived the exhausting withdrawal to reach San Giovanni di Medua in summer 1915.

== Military career ==
Divisional General Ivan Pavlović (1869-1943), the king's adjutant, first cousin of Queen Draga of Serbia, he graduated from the Military Academy in Belgrade, as well as the General Staff preparation for a military career. From 10 April to 29 May 1903, Pavlović was the King's Ordinance and Commander of the 3rd Battalion of the 6th Infantry Regiment. After the May coup, he was relieved of his duties, though kept his ranks in the military. From 7 July 1903, he was named commander of the 3rd Battalion of the 2nd Infantry Regiment; from 1906-1907, he became a member of the General Staff. In the wars of 1912-1918, he was the Commander of the 3rd Infantry Regiment of the 1st Call; in the suppression of the Ohrid–Debar uprising, he was Commander of the Joint Detachment under Radomir Putnik. He became Commander of the Užice United Brigade (1914-1915); Commander of the Užice Detachment (Užice Brigade, Donjovasojević Brigade and part of the Lim Detachment); Commander of the Užice Detachment (Lovčen and Kolašin brigades and the Studenica detachment); head of the adjutant department of the Supreme Command of the Serbian Army (1916-1918). After the war, he was the Chief of the History Department of the General Staff, Commander of the Kosovo Divisional Area.

== Personal life ==
Divisional General Ivan Pavlović (1869-1943) was married to Zora Dimitrijević (1882-1939), daughter of Stoiljko Dimitrijević, manager of the Post and Telegraph and sister of Colonel Svetolik Dimitrijević. Generals Vladimir Kondić and Dr. Mihailo Petrović served as a ushers at their wedding.

== Works ==
He published many works analyzing strategy, tactic and history in military publications, including a book:

- Из Наше Офанзиве 1914: Бој На Крстацу Изнад Пожеге 22. Новембра 1914 Године (From Our Offesnsive 1914: Battle of Krstac near Požega 22 November 1914) by Ivan S. Pavlović, General of Division (1928)

== See also ==
- Petar Bojović
- Radomir Putnik
- Živojin Mišić
- Stepa Stepanović
- Božidar Janković
- Ilija Gojković
- Pavle Jurišić Šturm
