= Karamarković =

Karamarković is a surname. Notable people with the surname include:

- Nikola Karamarković, Serbian revolutionary
- George M. Karamarkovich, retired major general in the United States Marine Corps

== See also ==
- Crnomarković
