= Tanasije Čarapić =

Serbian voivode

Atanasije Čarapić
- Атанасије Чарапић
- Born: 1770; Beli Potok, Ottoman Serbia
- Died: 1810 (aged 39–40); Prahovo, Ottoman Serbia
- Relatives: Vasa Čarapić (brother)
- Military career
- Allegiance: Serbian revolutionaries
- Rank: Voivode
- Nicknames: Tanasije, Tanasko
- Conflicts: First Serbian Uprising

Atanasije "Tanasije" Čarapić (Serbian Cyrillic: Атанасије "Танасије" Чарапић; 1770 – 1810) or Atanasije "Tanasko" Čarapić was a voivode and Serbian revolutionary. Members of the Čarapić family were among the first to join Karađorđe against the dahijas.

== Biography ==
Tanasije Čarapić, the younger brother of Vasa Čarapić, came originally from Beli Potok near Avala. He was killed in the battle of Prahovo in 1810. His wife was Ivana (cousin of Karađorđe's wife Jelena), who had sons Đorđe and Marko, and daughters Jeka (married in Boleč), Marta (married in Ivanča), Đurđija (married to Nikola Lunjevica, grandmother of Queen Draga) and Petrija (married in Ripanj). Tanasije Čarapić had a house in Belgrade's Dorćol district, below Pirinčana, the ruins of a palace once belonging to an Austrian commander of Belgrade in the 18th century named "Palace of Prince Evgenije" (Duke Alexander of Wüttemberg) in today's Dušanova Street, which was then the main street in Čaršija.

The tomb of Atanasije Čarapić is located near the Serbian Orthodox Church of Poreč, the old name for Donji Milanovac.

== Sources ==
- Milan Đ. Milićević, Pomenik znamenitih ljudi u srpskog narodu novijega doba, Vol 1 (Belgrade, 1888)
- Milan Đ. Milićević,Kneževina Srbija (Belgrade, 1878)

== See also ==
- List of Serbian Revolutionaries
