= Crnomarković =

Crnomarković is a surname. Notable people with the surname include:

- Dejan Crnomarković (born 1961), Serbian journalist
- Đorđe Crnomarković (born 1993), Serbian footballer
- Miloš Crnomarković (born 1993), Serbian footballer

== See also ==
- Karamarković
