= Čarapić =

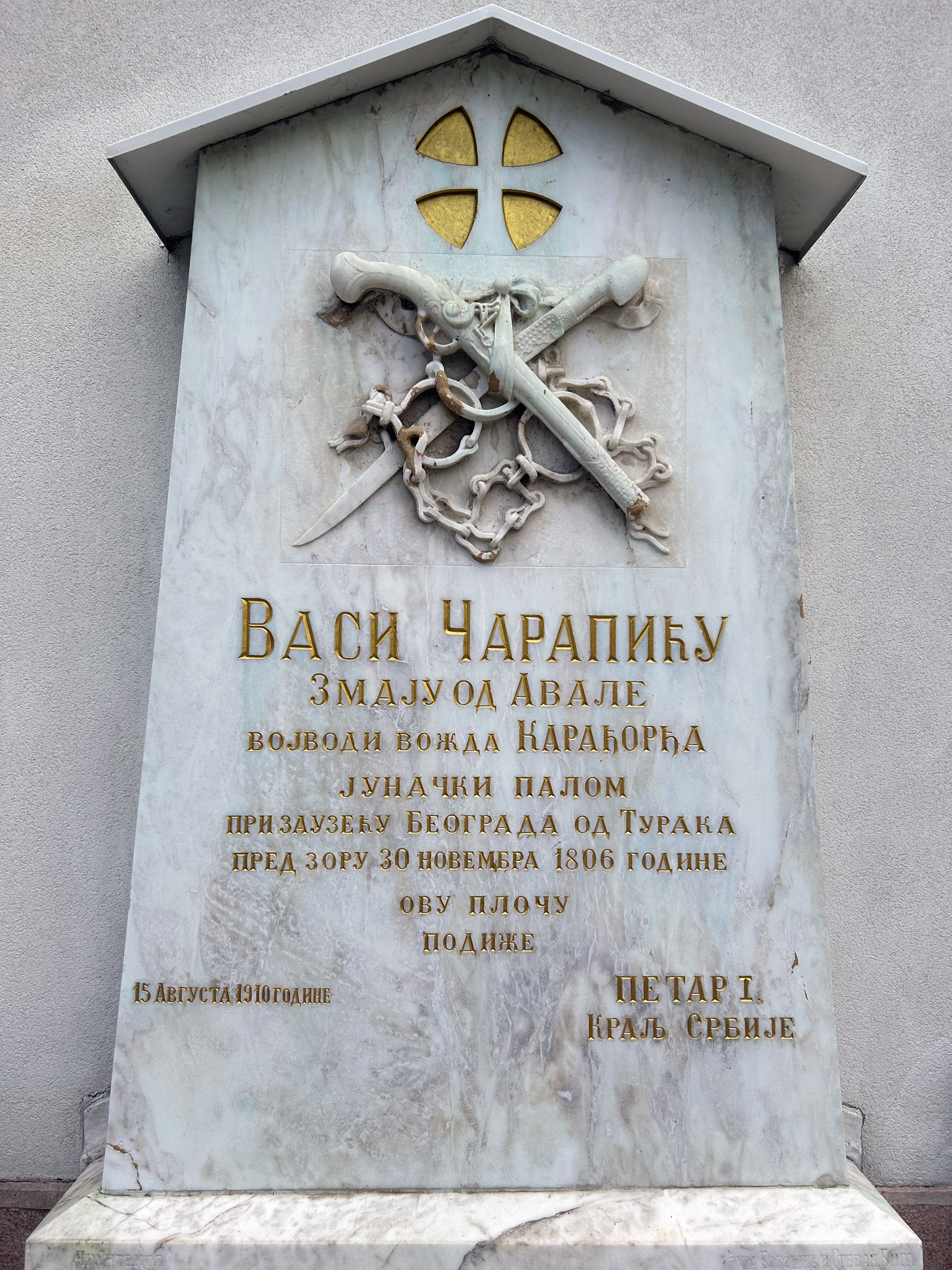
Grave of Vasa Čarapić (1768–1806), Serbian revolutionary

The Čarapić family was a prominent Serbian, formerly titled family, whose members participated in the Serbian Revolution and the subsequent government of the Principality of Serbia.

The family lived in Grocka nahija (Belgrade region). They intermarried with the House of Karadjordjević and were related to the other Serbian ruing family, House of Obrenović.

Đurđija Čarapić (1804–1882), the grandmother of Queen Draga, was married, as his fourth wife, to Nikola Milićević Lunjevica, Draga's grandfather. The marriage was arranged by Princess Ljubica, who was Nikola's blood relative. Đurđija was also first cousin of Karađorđe's son-in-law, Voivode Ilija Čarapić (1792–1844), first modern Mayor of Belgrade, the son of Vasa Čarapić, Serbian military commander, also known as the Dragon of Avala.

== History ==
The Čarapić family descended from the Vujanović brotherhood in Kuči (modern Montenegro), and had settled Grocka in ca. 1750. Later, they acquired military title of Voivode and the title of Obor-knez of Grocka nahiyah.

One of them, Marko Čarapić, Obor-knez of Beli Potok (d. 1804) was killed by the Ottomans during the Slaughter of the Knezes.

== Surname ==
Čarapić (Serbian Cyrillic: Чарапић) is also a surname found in Serbia and Croatia. The root of the word is čarapa, lit. 'sock'.

== Notable members ==
- Ana Čarapić (born 1985), Serbian politician
- Đorđe Čarapić (1773–1826), Serbian military leader
- Ilija Čarapić (1792–1844), mayor of Belgrade
- Ognjen Čarapić (born 1998), Montenegrin basketball player
- Tanasije Čarapić (1770–1810), Serbian duke
- Tom Carapic (born 1939), found object artist
- Uroš Čarapić (born 1996), Serbian basketball player
- Vasa Čarapić (1768–1806), Serbian revolutionary
