= Nikodije Lunjevica =

Lieutenant of the Royal Serbian Army

- Никодије Луњевица
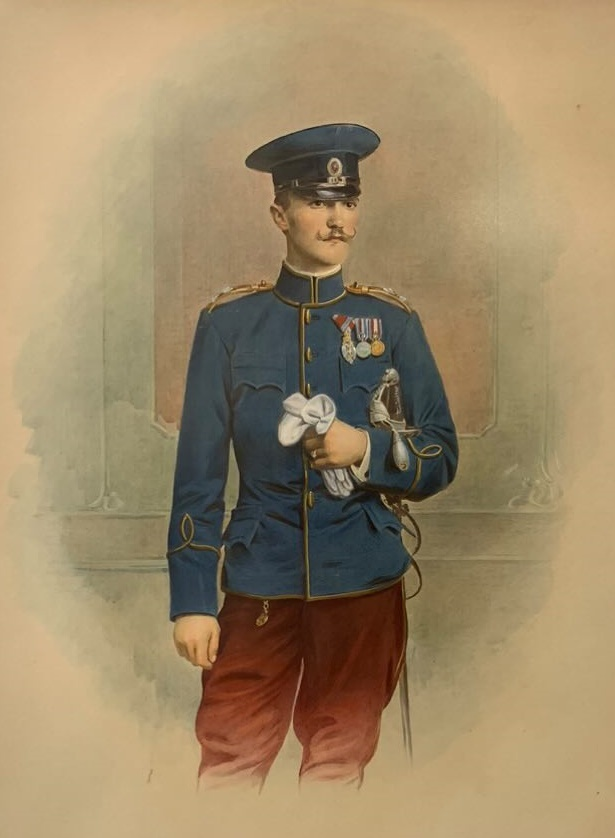
- Lunjevica in 1903
- Born: 1881; Gornji Milanovac, Principality of Serbia
- Died: 11 June 1903 (aged 21–22); Belgrade, Kingdom of Serbia
- Relatives: Draga Mašin (sister); Panta Lunjevica (father); Nikola Lunjevica (grandfather)
- Military career
- Allegiance: Kingdom of Serbia
- Branch: Royal Serbian Army
- Rank: Lieutenant
- Awards: Order of the White Eagle

Nikodije Lunjevica (Serbian Cyrillic: Никодије Луњевица; 1881 –11 June [O.S. 30 May] 1903) was a cavalry lieutenant of the Royal Serbian Army and a brother of Draga Mašin, the Queen consort of King Aleksandar Obrenović of the Kingdom of Serbia.

== Biography ==
=== Family ===
Nikodije was born in 1881 in Gornji Milanovac, then part of the Principality of Serbia. He was the second son of Panta Lunjevica, a prefect of the Aranđelovac area, and his wife Anđelija (née Koljević). Nikodije was one of seven siblings. He had a brother Nikola, and four sisters, Draga, Hristina, Đina and Ana (Vojka). Nikodije's mother was a dipsomaniac and his father died in a lunatic asylum. Nikodije was the grandson of Nikola Lunjevica, a relative of Princess Ljubica of Serbia and a close comrade of her husband Prince Miloš.

=== Military and political advancement ===
After the marriage of his sister Draga to King Alexander Obrenović, Nikodije and his brother Nikola were quickly promoted through the officer ranks of the Serbian Army. Serving in the cavalry, both brothers were known for their arrogant behaviour towards other officers. As King Alexander and Queen Draga had no heirs, Nikodije was considered the potential heir to the Serbian throne, while it is also considered that Draga's sole thought was "in what way will she use the influence she had on the young King, to be able to hand over Serbia to the despotic rage of her brother". Nikodije was almost always with the royal couple, and was occasionally addressed by courtiers as "Your Highness", even in the presence of King Alexander.

=== Death ===
During the night of the May Coup (10-11 June 1903), both Alexander and Draga were murdered in the royal palace in Belgrade by Serbian army officers. Almost immediately afterwards, both Lunjevica brothers were seized and shot by soldiers at the orders of Nikodije's former classmate Vojislav Tankosić. Because of all the previous humiliations of the army and the people, from the moment of the arrest until the execution, Tankosić addressed Nikodije and Nikola ironically with "Your Highness".

The coup and Alexander's assassination brought an end to the Obrenović dynasty.

Lunjevica, along with his family, is buried in the Vujan Monastery.

== Portrayal ==
Nikodije Lunjevica was played by Aleksandar Srećković in the 1995 Serbian mini-series The End of the Obrenović Dynasty.

== Literature ==
- Kazimirović, Vasa (1997). Crna ruka: ličnosti i događaji u Srbiji od prevrata 1903. do Solunskog procesa 1917. godine. Prizma. ISBN 978-86-7084-016-4.
- Belić, Milorad (2005). Komitski vojvoda Vojislav Tankosić. Međuopštinski Istorijski Arhiv. ISBN 978-86-80613-07-9.
- Pavlović, Slaviša (2017). Ratnici Crne ruke: besmrtna prethodnica. Prometej. ISBN 978-86-6195-129-9.
- Ristić, Ljubodrag P. (2014). Србија у британској политици (1889-1903): Serbia in British Politics (1889-1903). Balkanološki institut SANU. ISBN 978-86-7179-080-2.
- Vucinich, Wayne S. (2008). Serbia Between East and West: The Events of 1903-1908. Acls History E Book Project. ISBN 978-1-59740-402-0.
