= Vujan Monastery =

Serbian Orthodox monastery in Prislonica, Serbia

Coordinates: 43°58′40″N 20°27′15″E

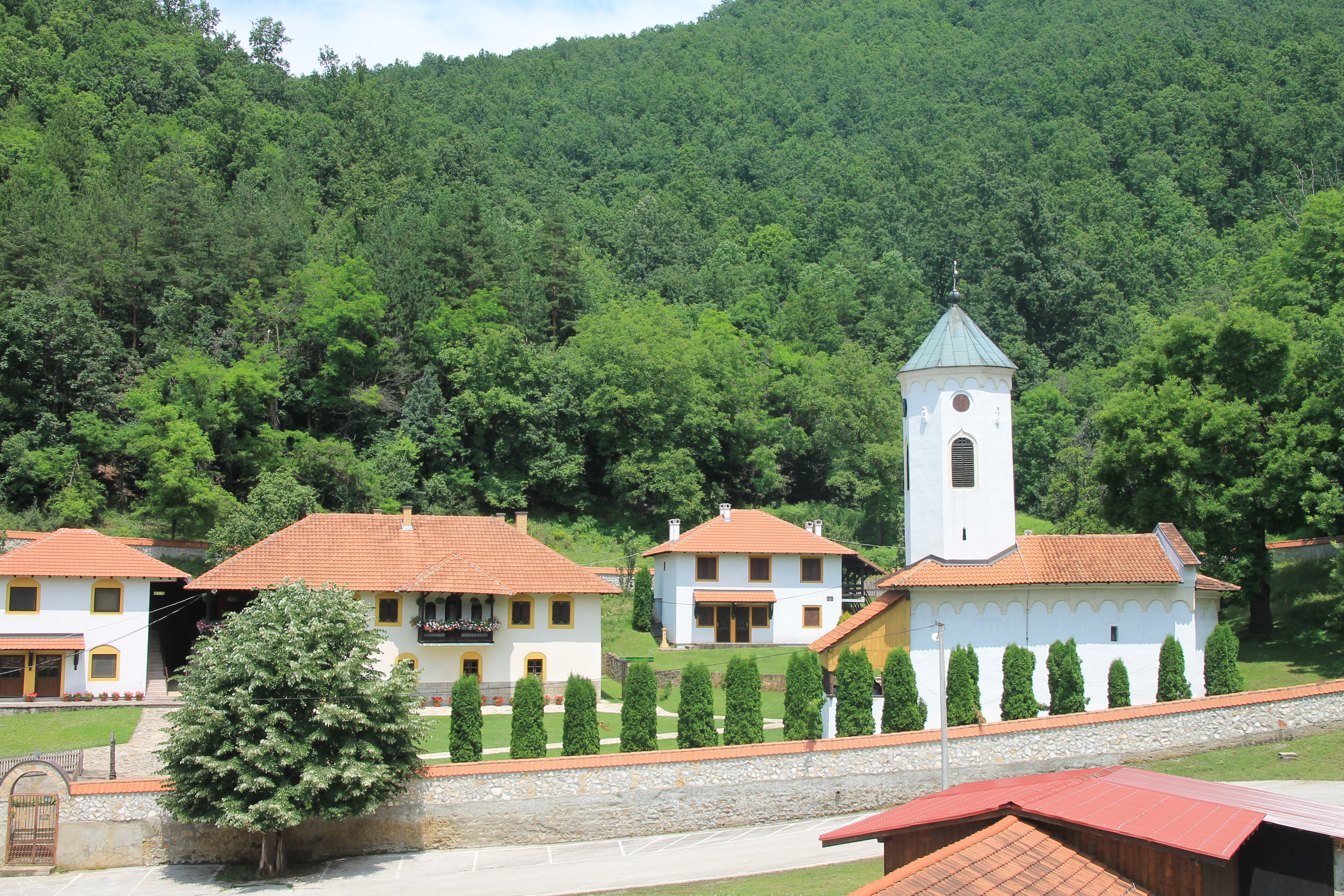
Vujan monastery

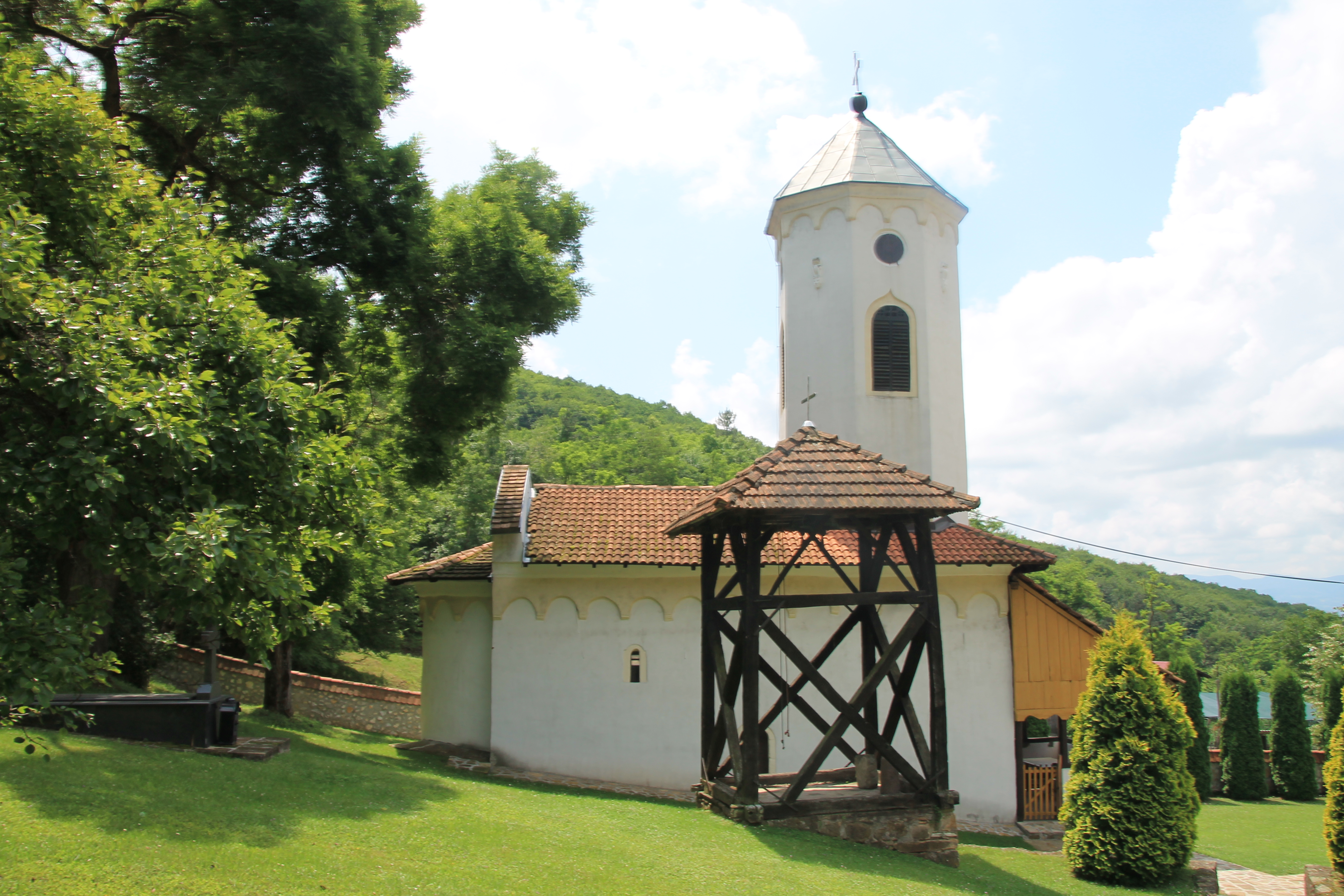
The church

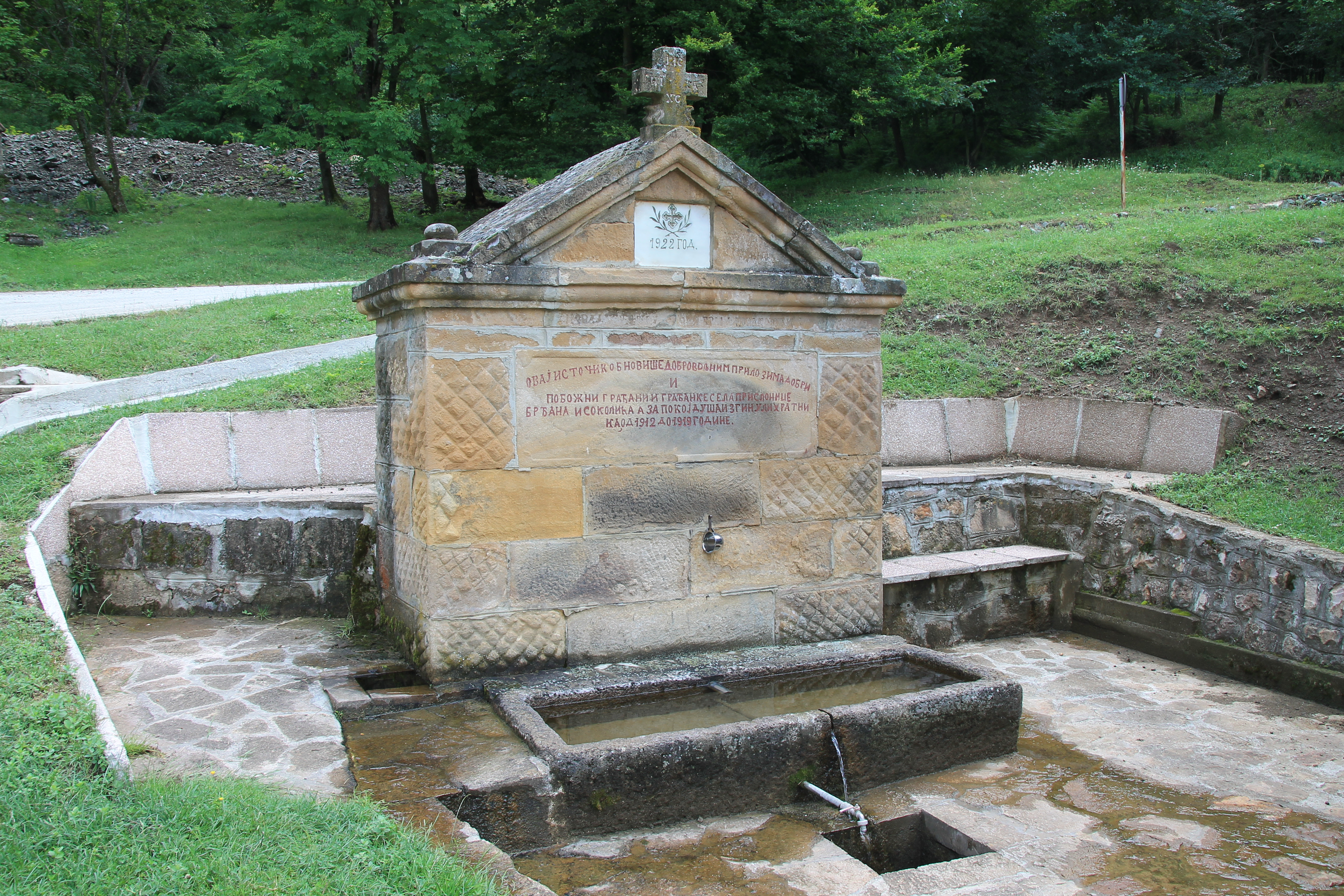
Vujan monastery fountain

Vujan Monastery (Serbian Cyrillic: Манастир Вујан) is a Serbian Orthodox Church monastery in Prislonica, Serbia. It is included in the list of cultural monuments of great importance of the Republic of Serbia. The monastery is located on the wooded slopes of Mount Vujan.

== History ==
The monastery was built near the foundations of the Obrovin Monastery, founded in the Middle Ages. Abandoned at the end of the 16th century, it was rebuilt in 1805 by Nikola Milićević Lunjevica, who participated in the Takovo uprising.

Ljunevica was the grandfather of Draga Mašin, the last queen of the Obrenović dynasty; he had his grandmother buried in the church of the new monastery. The voivode Lazar Mutap-Čačanin (c. 1775–1815), a famous hero of the first and second Serbian uprisings against the Ottomans, was buried in the narthex of the church. The konak (main monastic residence) was built in 1853 at the request of Alexander Karađorđević, at that time the reigning Prince of Serbia. In 1858, the monastery was renovated by Nikola's widow, Djurdjija Lunjevica and their son, Panta Lunjevica. The port of the monastery became burial ground of almost all members of the Milićević-Lunjevica family, except for Draga, who was buried alongside her husband Aleksandar Obrenović in the St. Mark's Church, Belgrade.

== Architecture ==
The church consists of a single nave extended by a semicircular apse and preceded by a narthex above which stands a high bell tower; it has an open wooden porch. The only decorations on the facades consist of a slightly profiled serrated frieze under the roof cornice and lions holding a human head in their paws depicted on the sides of the bell tower. The building was built of crushed and cut stones covered with plaster.

A fresco dating from 1808, the work of the painters Stojan and Jeremije, was copied by Rafailo Marković from Stara Srbija during the restoration of the church between 1939 and 1943; a new iconostasis was then installed.
