= Vujan =

Mountain in Serbia

- Вујан
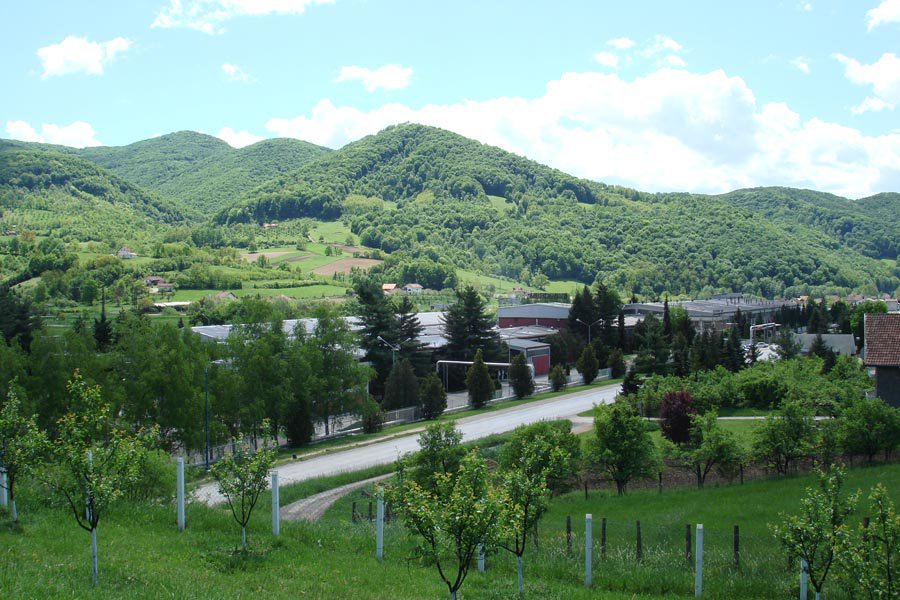

Highest point
- Elevation: 856 m (2,808 ft)
- Coordinates: 43°58′28″N 20°27′56″E

Geography
- Location within Serbia
- Location: Central Serbia
- Parent range: Dinaric Alps

Vujan (Serbian Cyrillic: Вујан) is a mountain in central Serbia, near the town of Gornji Milanovac. Its highest peak Veliki Vujan has an elevation of 856 meters above sea level. It is the site of the Vujan Monastery.

== See also ==
- List of mountains in Serbia
