= George M. Karamarkovich =

United States Marine Corps general

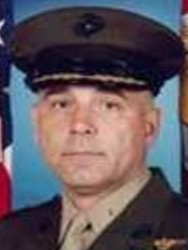
- Born: 1942 (age 83–84); Rochester, Pennsylvania, U.S.
- Military career
- Allegiance: United States
- Branch: United States Marine Corps
- Service years: 1967–1990s
- Rank: Major general

George M. Karamarkovich (born 1942) is a retired major general in the United States Marine Corps who was commanding general of the 1st Marine Aircraft Wing and Marine Corps Air Station Cherry Point. He is a native of Pennsylvania.

He is of Serbian descent.
