= Ana Čarapić =

Serbian politician (born 1985)

Ana Čarapić (Serbian Cyrillic: Ана Чарапић; born 1985) is a politician in Serbia. She has served in the National Assembly of Serbia since 2017 as a member of the Serbian Progressive Party.

== Early life and career ==
Čarapić was born in Kuršumlija, in what was then the Socialist Republic of Serbia in the Socialist Federal Republic of Yugoslavia. She holds a bachelor's degree as an economist.

== Parliamentarian ==
Čarapić received the 141st position on the Progressive Party's Aleksandar Vučić – Serbia Is Winning electoral list in the 2016 Serbian parliamentary election. The list won 131 out of 250 mandates, and Čarapić was not initially elected; she was able to take a seat in the assembly on 21 September 2017 as a replacement for Aleksandra Đurović, who had resigned to take a diplomatic position. During this sitting of the assembly, Čarapić was a member of the committee on the economy, regional development, trade, tourism, and energy; a deputy member of the environmental protection committee; the head of Serbia's parliamentary friendship group with Bolivia; and a member of the parliamentary friendship groups with Austria, Bosnia and Herzegovina, the Czech Republic, Germany, Ghana, Greece, Montenegro, North Macedonia, Poland, Russia, Slovakia, Slovenia, and Spain.

She was given the 174th position on the successor Aleksandar Vučić — For Our Children list in the 2020 parliamentary election and was elected to a second term when the list won a landslide majority with 188 mandates. She is now a member of the committee on finance, state budget, and control of public spending; a member of the committee on labour, social issues, social inclusion, and poverty reduction; a deputy member of the committee on spatial planning, transport, infrastructure, and telecommunications; the leader of Serbia's parliamentary friendship group with Bolivia; and a member of the parliamentary friendship groups with Austria, Bosnia and Herzegovina, China, the Czech Republic, Germany, Greece, Montenegro, Poland, Russia, Slovakia, and Spain.
