= Nikola Karamarković =

Karađorđević dynasty

Nikola Karamarković (Serbian: Никола Карамарковић; Lunjevica, then Ottoman Empire now Serbia, 1776 – Hotin, then part of Russia, now Ukraine, 1816) is best remembered as Karađorđe's heroic brother-in-law. Nikola took over the title of voivode of Užice after his brother Joksim Karamarković was killed in battle against the Turks in 1813. Nikola died in 1816 in Hotin, then part of Imperial Russia.

He was married to Sarka Petrović the sister of Karađorđe.
