= Dejan Crnomarković =

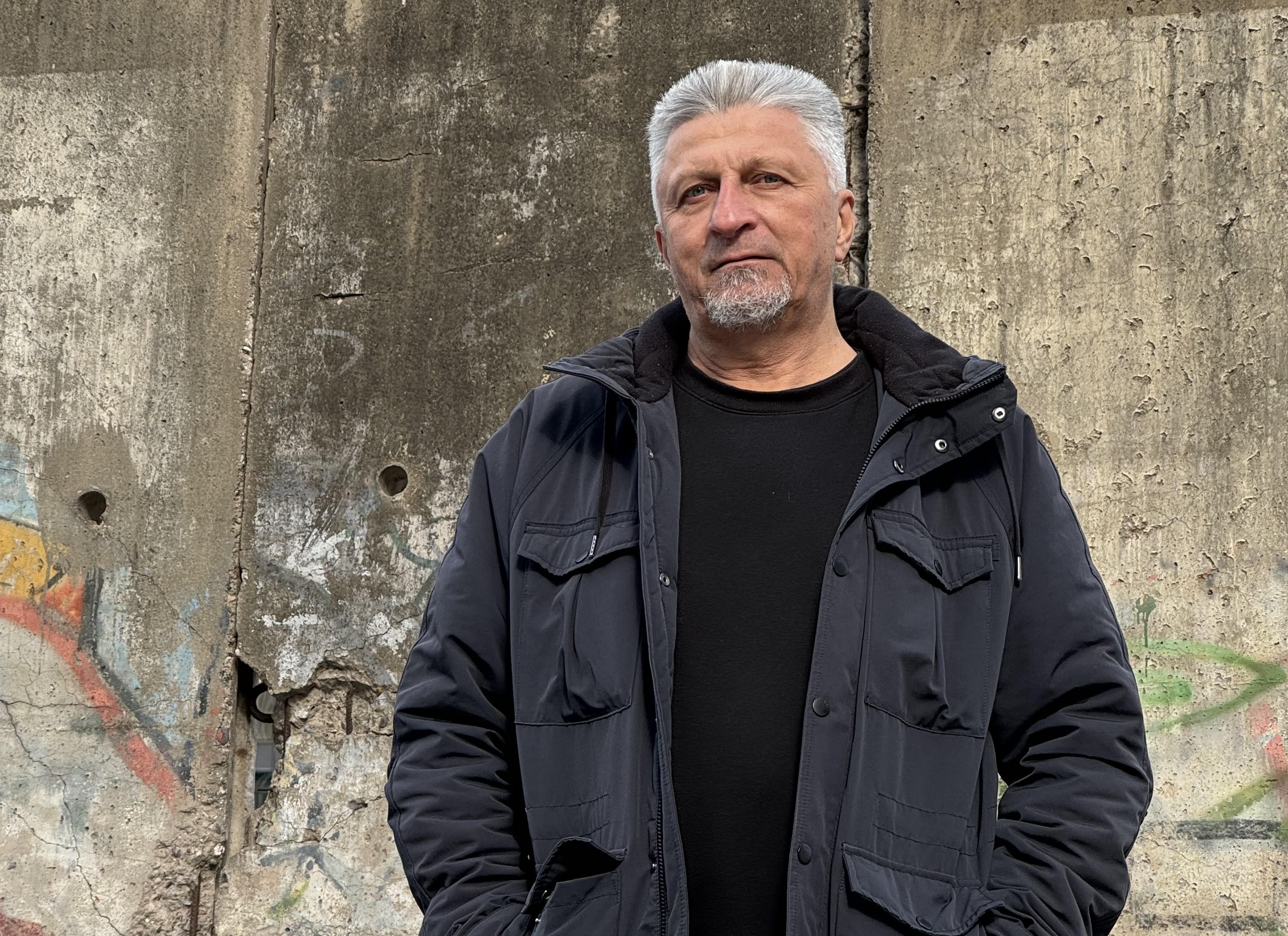
- Born: 28 November 1961, Smederevska Palanka, Serbia, Yugoslavia
- Occupations: Journalist, columnist, short story writer, poet
- Notable work: Part of unrest, About lost days, God wanted me to be a bird
- Spouse: Sladjana Crnomarković
- Children: Luka Nikola Crnomarković

Dejan Crnomarković (1961) is a Yugoslav and Serbian journalist, columnist, short story writer and poet.

== Biography ==
He is the founder and editor of the Palanka newspaper - Palanačke nezavisne varoške novine and the Sumadija news - Šumadijske vesti

Various publishing houses in Yugoslavia, Serbia and Greece published six books of poetry by this author. The poetry book About Lost Days was promoted in Greece in 2015.

The books Part of the Unrest and About the Lost Days were also promoted in China, in the Library of the Canadian International School in Hefei and are in the holdings of the National Library of Anhui Province.

It was presented in the Bruj Šumadija Anthology (200 Šumadija poets from 1804-2004.). The poetry book About lost days was published in Greece in 2015. and promoted on December 20, 2015. in the Free thinking zone in Athens.

He published short prose in the books Otkucaji peščanog sata, Short Stories 2021 and Short stories 2023.

He won the Ratković award in Montenegro in 1987. and the Charter of the Association of Writers in the Fatherland and Dispersion, 2024.

He is one of the founders of the Alternative Art Group Petum and a member of the Union of writers in homeland and dispersion, the Association of Journalists of Serbia and the International Federation of Journalists.

Lived in Yugoslavia, Serbia, Greece (1993-1994.), China (2017-2019.), Thailand (2019-2021.), South Korea (2021-2024.), Senegal (2024-2026.) and Thailand (2026-...)

== Journalistic work ==
He started his journalistic career in 1988 in the youth newspaper Treće oko, and continued in TV ANEM, the daily newspaper Centar and Pres and RTV Jasenica in Smederevska Palanka.

Since 2006, he has been the publisher and editor of the Palanačke nezavisne varoške novine magazine, and since 2015 of the Šumadijske vesti portal. In these two media, among other things, he publishes the columns On the Trail and Extraordinary Comment.

He is a member of the Association of Journalists of Serbia and the International Federation of Journalists.

== Literary work ==
He was the winner of the Ratković Poetry Evenings in Montenegro in 1987. He is represented in the Anthology of 200 Šumadija poets from 1804-2004 by Bruj Šumadija. The poetry book About Lost Days was published in Greece in 2015. The books Part of the Unrest and About the Lost Days were also promoted in China, in the Library of the Canadian International School in Hefei and are in the holdings of the National Library of Anhui Province. He is a member of the Alternative Art Group Petum with four other academic painters from Serbia, the Association of Writers in Homeland and Dispersion and the Pera Todorović Literary Club.

== Bibliography ==
- Part of the unrest - first edition (MZKPD Montenegro, 1989.)
- Hand games - words and pictures (MIMO, Belgrade, poetry, prose,1990.)
- About lost days (MIMO, Belgrade, poetry, 2005.)
- Part of the unrest - second edition (Milutin Srećković Library, Smederevska Palanka, 2015.)
- Μια τις χαμενες μερες (Direct publishing, Athens 2015.)
- God wanted me to be a bird (Milutin Srećković Library, Smederevska Palanka, 2020.)
- Notes and comments (Palanka info, PDF edition, Smederevska Palanka 2026).
