= Lunjevica =

Lunjevica Луњевица
- Village
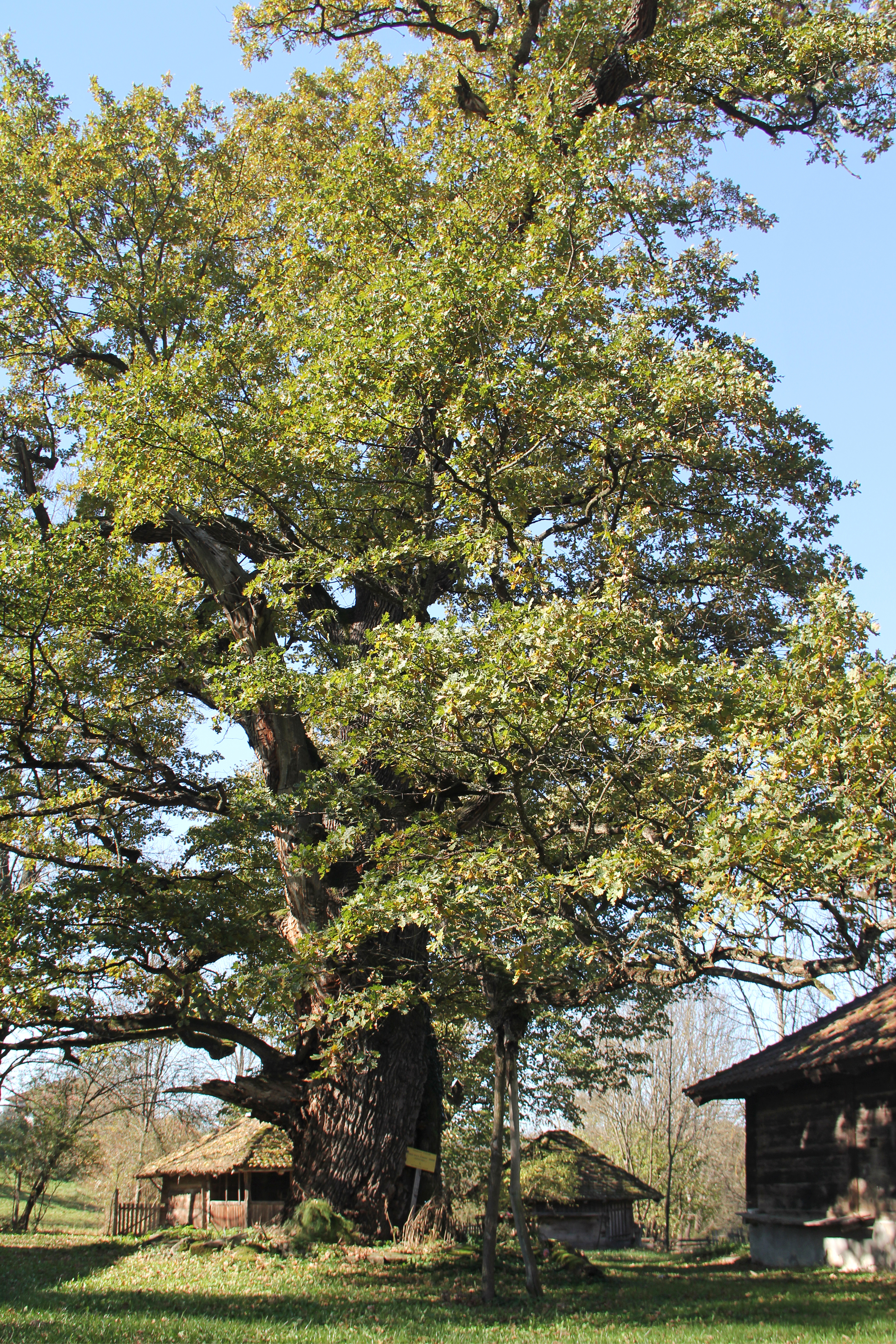
- An old oak on the estate of the Trifunović family

- Location within Serbia
- Coordinates: 44°00′00″N 20°29′16″E
- Country: Serbia
- District: Moravica District
- Municipality: Gornji Milanovac

Population (2002)
  - Total: 512
- Time zone: UTC+1 (CET)
  - Summer (DST): UTC+2 (CEST)

Lunjevica (Serbian Cyrillic: Луњевица) is a village in the municipality of Gornji Milanovac, Serbia. According to the 2002 census, the village has a population of 512 people. Revolutionary Nikola Lunjevica was born in the village.

The village was active in the Serbian Revolution, being organized into the knežina (administrative unit) of Brusnica (Takovo) during the First Serbian Uprising (1804–13). Among notable local revolutionaries were: leader Nikola Lunjevica (1767–1842); vojvoda of Crna Gora knežina and Užice town Nikola Karamarković (1776–1816); vojvoda in Užice Joksim Karamarković (d. 1813) who fell at Ravnje.
