= Vozhd =

Slavic honorific

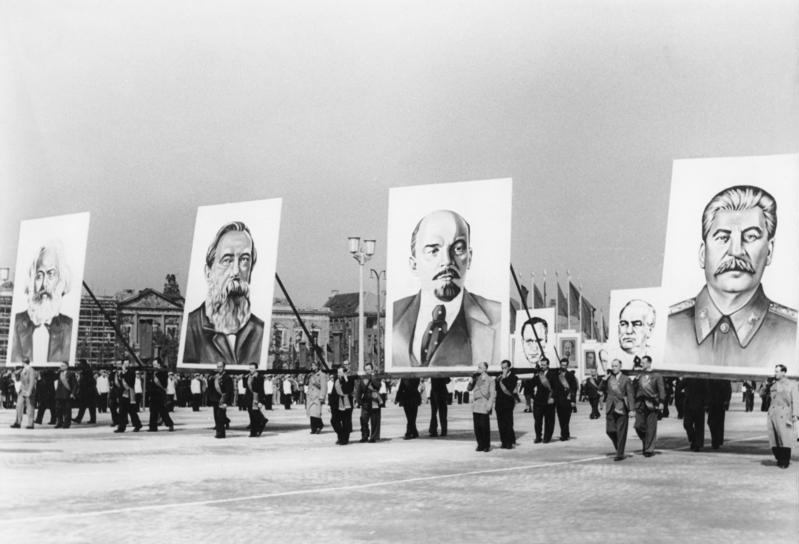
Vozhdi of the world's proletariat: Marx, Engels, Lenin and Stalin (1 May 1953, Berlin, GDR).

A vozhd (romanised from Belarusian, Russian and Ukrainian: вождь, also Bulgarian, Macedonian and Serbo-Croatian: вожд, romanized: vožd, (Note: vožd is a loanword from Russian. Not to be confused with the regular Serbo-Croatian noun vođa.) Czech: vůdce, Polish: wódz, Slovak: vodca, or Slovene: vodja), literally meaning "the guidesperson" or "the leader," is a historical title with an etymology deriving from the Proto-Slavic *voďь and thus is common across Slavic languages. It originally denoted a chieftain of a tribe. Upon the rise of statehood, it was used thereafter also in the context of a supreme leader and/or supreme commander, in particular when both roles were combined in one person.

In most Slavic languages, the official and colloquial usage of the designation has now been discontinued in favor of (at least) two more precise derivates, one meaning "a leader" and another one "a commander" (for example, Polish: przywódca and dowódca, respectively). Therefore, the original term may typically be encountered exclusively in historical or ironic contexts. Otherwise, it is used occasionally only to refer to extant foreign tribal communities.

== History ==
In Serbia, the title was given to Karađorđe Petrović by all the voivodes who elected him to be their leader at their first Praviteljstvujušći sovjet (Government Council) during the First Serbian Uprising, in the 19th century. As such, Karađorđe was titled Grand Vožd of Serbia.

Later, in Russia, it was often used in reference to Soviet leaders such as Vladimir Lenin and Joseph Stalin as "Vozhd of the Proletariat" (Russian: Вождь пролетариата) "Vozhd of the Russian Communist Party" (Russian: Вождь Российской Коммунистической Партии), "Vozhd of the World Revolution" (Russian: Вождь мировой революции), "Vozhd of the Peoples" (Russian: Вождь народов), or "Vozhd of the Soviet people" (Russian: Вождь советского народа).

In modern Russian, vozhd became exclusive for communist leaders or chieftains of aboriginal tribes. The word is becoming somewhat obsolete and is being replaced by its English version, "leader". It is a counterpart to the word Führer in German.

== See also ==
- Tsar
