= Ilija Čarapić =

Serbian politician

1st Mayor of Belgrade
- In office 7 May 1839 – 27 May 1840
- Succeeded by: Miloš Bogićević

Personal details
- Born: 1792 Beli Potok, Ottoman Empire
- Died: 1844 (aged 51–52) Belgrade, Principality of Serbia
- Spouse: Stamenka Karađorđević

Ilija Čarapić (Serbian Cyrillic: Илија Чарапић, pronounced [ǐlija t͡ʃǎrapit͡ɕ]), was the first Mayor of Belgrade, Serbia. He was born in 1792 in Beli Potok, near Avala, and died in 1844. He was son of the Voyvode Vasa Čarapić and the brother-in-law of Karađorđe, appointed as Voyvode or Duke of Grocka when he was only 18 years old after his uncle, Voyvode Tanasije Čarapić, who died in Prahovo, near Negotin.

Vojvoda Ilija Čarapić, with his wife Stamenka Karađorđević had no children. Ilija was the stepfather of Stamenka's daughter Jelena Ristić, who married Đorđe Radojlović, the founder of the Radojlović family.

== See also ==
- Mayor of Belgrade
- List of Serbian Revolutionaries

== Sources ==
- Станиша ВОЈИНОВИЋ, "КАРАЂОРЂЕВИ ЗЕТОВИ – ИЛИЈА ЧАРАПИЋ И ТОДОР БОЈАНИЋ", 1804, 11 (15)

Government offices
Preceded by post created	Mayor of Belgrade; 7 May 1839 – 27 May 1840	Succeeded by Miloš Bogićević
