= Beli Potok (Belgrade) =

Beli Potok Бели Поток
- Town
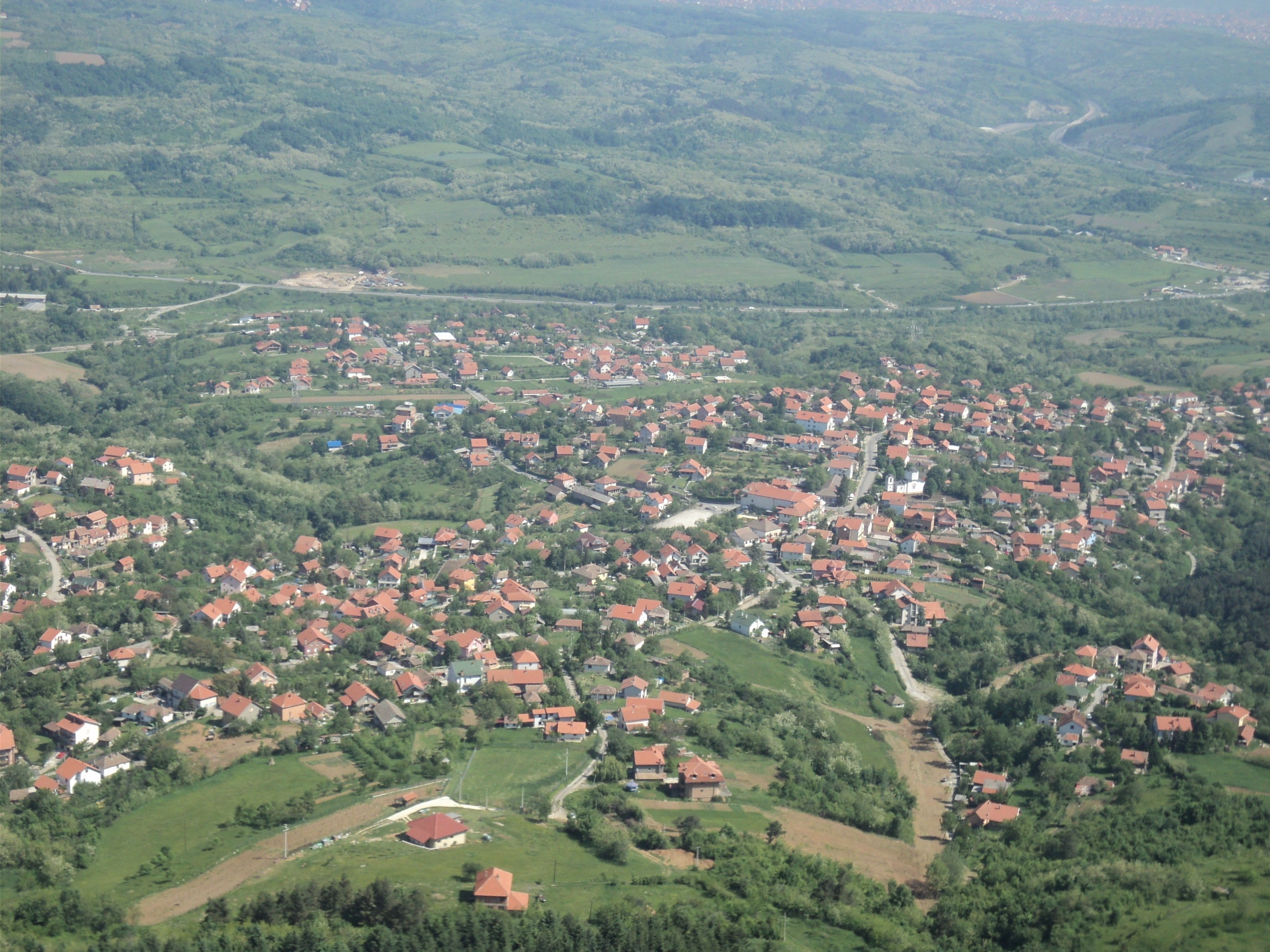
- View of the Beli Potok from the Avala tower.

- Location within Serbia
- Coordinates: 44°42′22″N 20°31′09″E
- Country: Serbia
- District: City of Belgrade
- Municipality: Voždovac

Area
  - Total: 15.52 km^{2} (5.99 sq mi)

Population (2022 census)
  - Town: 3,717
- Time zone: UTC+1 (CET)
  - Summer (DST): UTC+2 (CEST)
- Postal code: 11223
- Area code: +381 011
- Car plates: BG

Beli Potok (Serbian Cyrillic: Бели Поток) is a small town and a suburban settlement of Belgrade, Serbia. It is located in Belgrade's Municipality of Voždovac.

== Location ==
Beli Potok is located in on the northern slope of the Avala mountain, near the crossroads of the roads of Avalski put, which connects Belgrade with the Avala, and Kružni put, the major road connecting the settlements on the southern outskirts of Belgrade. To the south, Beli Potok extends in the direction of the small town of Pinosava, to the east in the direction of Bubanj Potok and to the north it makes one continuous built-up area with the urban neighborhood of Selo Rakovica, but Beli Potok is administratively classified as a separate settlement and not part of the Belgrade City proper (uža teritorija grada).

== Population ==
Beli Potok is statistically classified as an urban settlement (town). The population has been steadily declining from the 1970s to 1990s, but with the large influx of refugees from the Yugoslav Wars after 1991, the population began to grow again. Population of Beli Potok according to the official censuses of population:

- 1921: 1,171
- 1971: 3,237
- 1981: 3,150
- 1991: 2,997
- 2002: 3,417
- 2011: 3,621

== Characteristics ==
Beli Potok is the birthplace of Vasa Čarapić (1770–1806), one of the main army leaders from the First Serbian Uprising, and the main street in the town bears his name. In the field west of Beli Potok is the institute for the development of water resources Jaroslav Černi. Some of the other well known features in the town are the famed motel Hiljadu ruža and kafana Kumbara. A railway also passes through the town, going through the tunnel constructed under the north-western corner of the settlement. The name, beli potok, is descriptive, meaning "white creek" in Serbian.

There is a church dedicated to the Holy Mary Magdalene in town. In front of the churchyard entrance is a memorial drinking fountain, commemorating the local partisan soldiers killed in World War II. It contains names of the Beli Potok residents killed during the war, so as the names of the Soviet Red Army soldiers.

Construction of the water treatment facility in Beli Potok began in June 2020. The town already has a sewage system, so the facility will treat the wastewater and safely return it to the environment.

== Future ==
In September 2007 an official motion was started by the municipality of Voždovac to create new sub-Avalan municipality (Avalski Venac), which would include the settlements of Ripanj, Beli Potok, Pinosava and Zuce from Voždovac, Vrčin from the municipality of Grocka and Resnik from the municipality of Rakovica. In October 2007 municipal assembly began construction of the building in central Beli Potok which would serve as an outer representation of the assembly and the future municipal seat if new municipality is to be created.

== See also ==
- List of Belgrade neighborhoods and suburbs
- Cities and towns in Serbia
- Populated places of Serbia
