= Vasa Čarapić =

Serbian military commander (1768–1806)

- Васа Чарапић
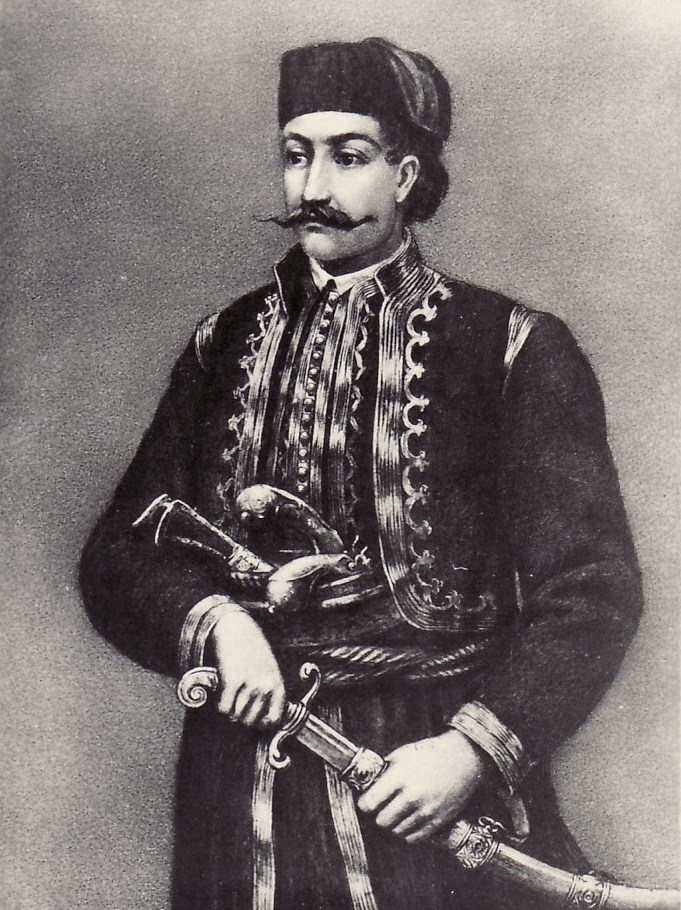
- Born: 1768; Beli Potok, in Belgrade, Ottoman Empire
- Died: 1806 (aged 37–38); Belgrade
- Military career
- Allegiance: Habsburg monarchy; Revolutionary Serbia
- Service years: 1788–1806
- Rank: Vojvoda
- Nickname: Vasa
- Conflicts: Koča's frontier rebellion; First Serbian Uprising: Siege of Belgrade †

Vasilije "Vasa" Čarapić (Serbian Cyrillic: Василије "Васа" Чарапић; 1768–1806), known as the Dragon of Avala (Serbian: Змај од Авале, romanized: Zmaj od Avale) and Vasso Tscharapitsch (German), was a Serbian voivode who participated in the First Serbian Uprising of the Serbian Revolution against the Ottoman Empire.

== Biography ==
Vasa Čarapić was born in 1768, in Beli Potok, under the Avala mountain. The Čarapić family was originally from the Kuči tribe in Montenegro, and they got an interesting nickname that turned into a surname when one of his ancestors accidentally killed a Turk's dog, and the Turk demanded 500 groschens compensation for his pet. When the family collected the money, one of his ancestors sent the money in a čarapa (a sock) instead of a bag. It was from then on that the name Čarapić stuck as a surname.

== Serbian Free Corps ==
Vasa Čarapić participated in Kočina Krajina as a Freikorps. In the war between Turkey and Austria, Vasa fought as a volunteer against the Turks. On that occasion, he was distinguished by exceptional heroism, so he gained a great reputation. That is why he was elected the prince of the Grocka nahija (municipality) at the nahija assembly. Vasa was also known for one thing - great hatred towards the Turks, which became proverbial.

In 1804, just before the winter, the Dahijas were preparing to start cutting down the Serbian princes, and Vasa, after learning about that, fled to Avala with two other Čarapićs. When the Belgrade Turks came to Beli Potok to look for him, he attacked and drove them away. Shortly afterwards, the Turks killed Vasa's brother Marko Čarapić, Obor-knez of Grocka nahiyah (d. 1804), in Kaludjerica during the Slaughter of the Knezes.

== Hajduk ==
Then he burned the Turkish khan and defected to the hajduks. He spent one hard winter in the mountains and barely survived. It is said that, when the mountain began to leaf, he put a silver coin in the first leafy tree he saw, fired his pistol and exclaimed with joy: "I dare you now Turks, Vasa has grown the wings!"

He gathered around him a company of brave men in the fight against the Turks. The name of Vase Čarapić became especially famous when he intercepted a Turkish kardžalija (caravan) near Leštane, and gained a great treasure. He distributed everything he received among the people.

== Uprising ==
After the beginning of the uprising, he became one of the main military leaders, and Karađorđe appreciated him so much that he was one of the few who dared to enter his tent unannounced. According to a legend, he was a little deaf, but even in his sleep, when he heard someone say the word Turks, he jumped, took his rifle and aimed ready to fire.

== Death ==
In 1806, Karađorđe hesitated whether to go to Belgrade or not. However, at the urging of Vasa Čarapić himself, he decided to attack. The other elders did not believe that it was possible to conquer Belgrade, but Vasa knew the circumstances well and persuaded Karađorđe to strike. The attack began at dawn on 29 November with a lightning strike by Serbs inside the walls. Vasa and 3,000 of his soldiers attacked a trench near the Stambol Gate, on the present-day Republic Square, approximately at the beginning of Skadarska street; however, when he ran towards the Stambol Gate and shouted: "Follow me, brothers!" A Turkish bullet struck him down but he was still conscious and able to speak.

He said then -- "Behold, a dog has eaten me, and his law! ... Don't be afraid! Here is Čamdžija singing!"—encouraging his comrades-in-arms. At that very moment, Milosav Čamdžija mounted a Turkish cannon on the rampart and sang out loud upon hearing Vasa. Čarapić was immediately transferred to Karađorđe's tent, where he fought for his life for another two hours, but then he died. Before his death, he called his brother Tanasije Čarapić and told him to bury him in the cemetery on the property of the Rakovica Monastery. His wish was fulfilled, and a monument to King Peter I of Serbia was erected a century later (1910).

The people of Belgrade named the street from Trg republike to Studentski trg as part of the heroes. The monument to Vasa Čarapić is right at the place where he died, not far from the street named after him.

== Interesting facts ==
In the 1955 film "Poem from Kumbara", which talks about the siege of the occupation of Belgrade, Vasa Carapić is played by Vasa Pantelić. The film shows the death of the duke with his famous sentence.

== Legacy ==
In Belgrade, there is a monument to Vasa Čarapić at the spot where he was killed in front of the National Theatre, and nearby is the street (Улица Васе Чарапића) that was named after him.

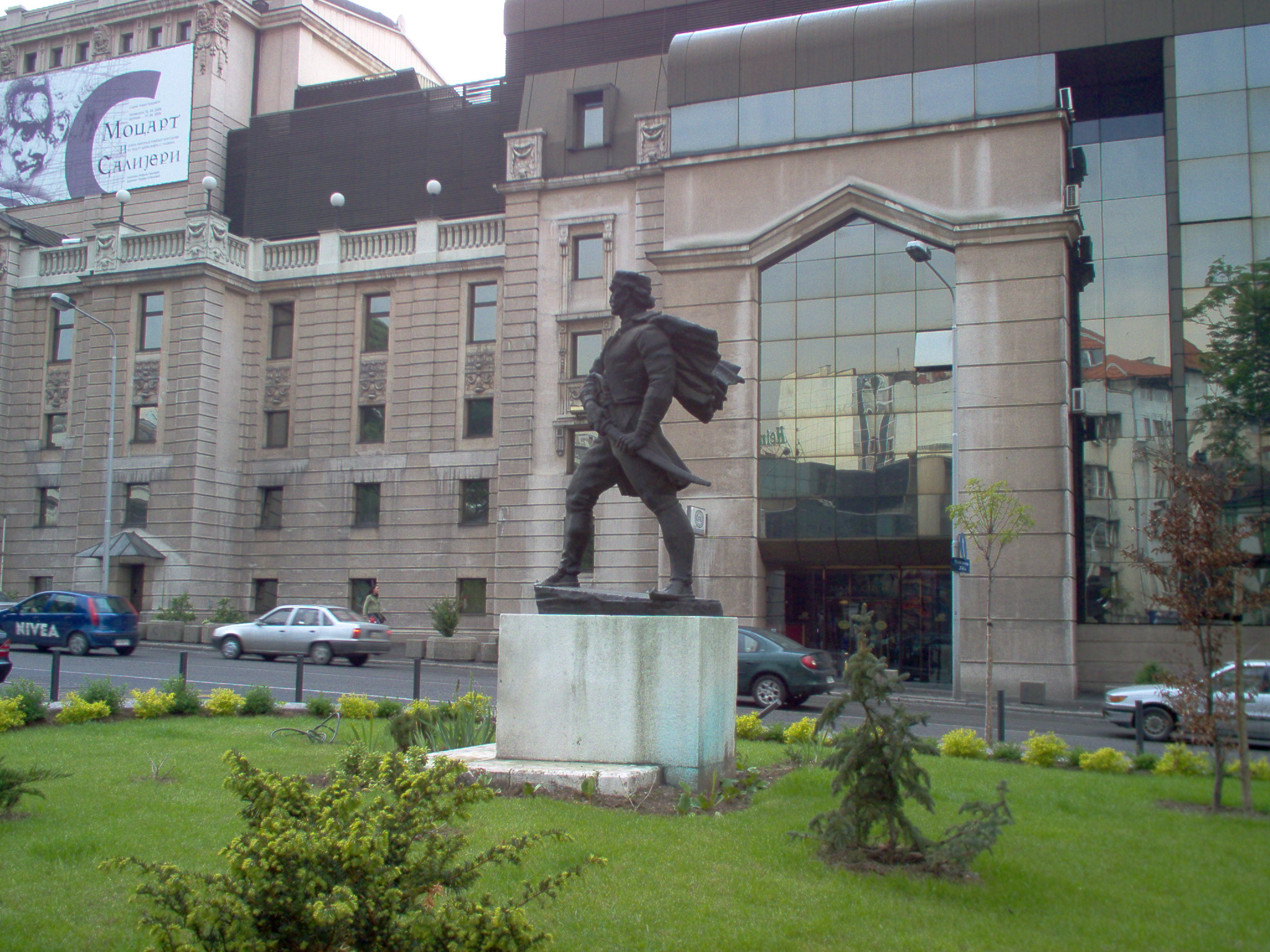
Monument near the National Theatre, in Belgrade

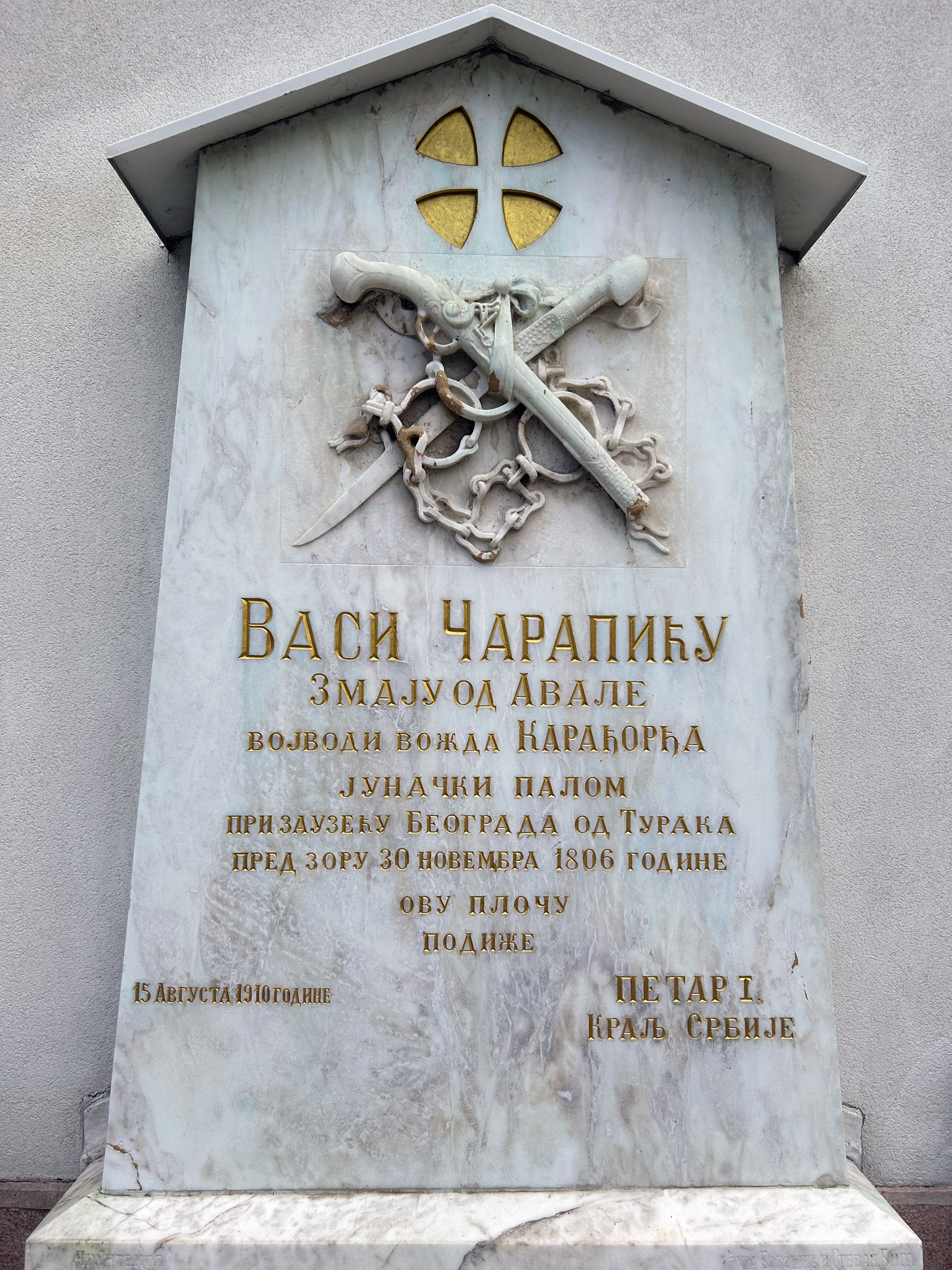
Grave at Rakovica monastery

== See also ==
- List of Serbian Revolutionaries

== Sources ==
- БОЖОВИЋ, АЛЕКСАНДАР, Споменик Васи Чарапићу у Београду, pp. 35–45
- Milićević, Milan Đ. (1888). Поменик знаменитих људи у српског народа новијега доба. Издање Чупићеве задужбине.
- Nenadović, Konstantin N. (1903) [1883]. Живот и дела великог Ђорђа Петровића Кара-Ђорђа. Vol. I (2 ed.). Belgrade: Штампа Савића и Комп. – via Archive.org.
- Nenadović, Konstantin N. (1884). Живот и дела великог Ђорђа Петровића Кара-Ђорђа. Vol. II (1 ed.). Vienna: У Штампарији Јована Н. Вернаја – via Google Books.
