= Draga Mašin =

Queen of Serbia from 1900 to 1903

Draga Obrenović
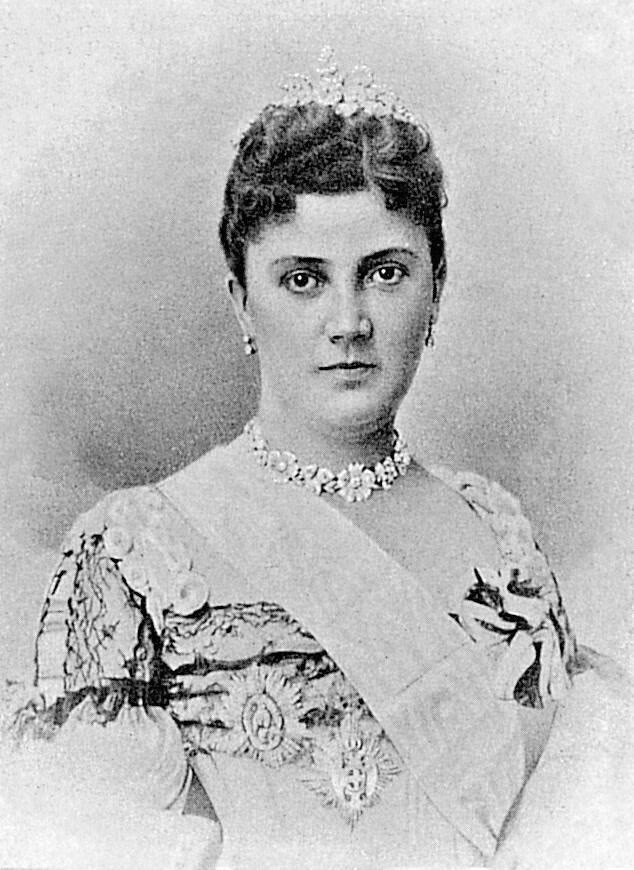

Queen consort of Serbia
- Tenure: 5 August [O.S. 23 July] 1900 – 11 June [O.S. 29 May] 1903
- Born: 11 September 1867 (Old style); Gornji Milanovac, Principality of Serbia
- Died: 11 June 1903 (aged 35) (Old style); Belgrade, Kingdom of Serbia
- Burial: St. Mark's Church, Belgrade
- Spouse: Svetozar Mašin (m. 1883; died 1886) Alexander I of Serbia (m. 1900)
Names
- Draginja Milićević Lunjevica
- House: Obrenović (by marriage)
- Father: Pantelija Milićević Lunjevica
- Mother: Anđelija Koljević
- Religion: Eastern Orthodox Christian

Draginja "Draga" Obrenović (Serbian Cyrillic: Драгиња "Драга" Обреновић; 23 September [O.S. 11 September] 1867 – 11 June [O.S. 29 May] 1903), née Lunjevica (Луњевица) and formerly Mašin (Машин), was Queen of Serbia as the wife of King Aleksandar Obrenović. She was formerly a lady-in-waiting to Aleksandar's mother, Queen Natalija (until 1897).

== Early life ==
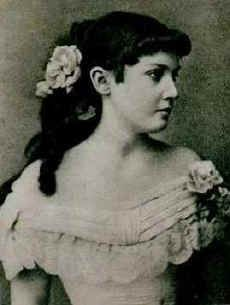
Draga Mašin in her younger days (date unknown)

Draga was the fourth daughter of Panta Lunjevica, a prefect of the Aranđelovac area, and wife Anđelija (née Koljević). Draga was the sixth of seven siblings. She had two brothers, Nikola and Nikodije, and four sisters, Hristina, Đina, Ana and Vojka. Draga's mother was a dipsomaniac and her father died in a lunatic asylum.

Draga was the granddaughter of Nikola Lunjevica, a blood relative of Princess Ljubica of Serbia and close comrade of Prince Miloš, her husband's great-granduncle. Her paternal grandmother was Đurđija Čarapić (1804–1882), a cousin of vojvoda Ilija Čarapić (died 1844), husband of Stamenka Karađorđević (1799–1875), fourth daughter of Karađorđe Petrović, Grand Vožd of Serbia.

At the age of nine, Draga was sent to school in Belgrade, where she completed her school-education. Then she attended the "Cermanka's Institute" or "Women's Institute". There she learned several foreign languages, including Russian, French and German.

During her stay in Belgrade, Draga began to write novels and short stories as well as to translate books for money. Despite the fact that her father took a lot of care about her, she began to earn her living as a very young girl. She published some well informed stories for foreign journals. She liked to read and especially liked to read Stendhal. At the time of her second marriage, she was the widow of Svetozar Mašin (1851-1886), a Czech civil engineer, son of Jan Mašin, who served as the royal physician to King Milan, her future father-in-law. She married Svetozar in August 1883 in the Cathedral Church of Belgrade.

== Queen ==
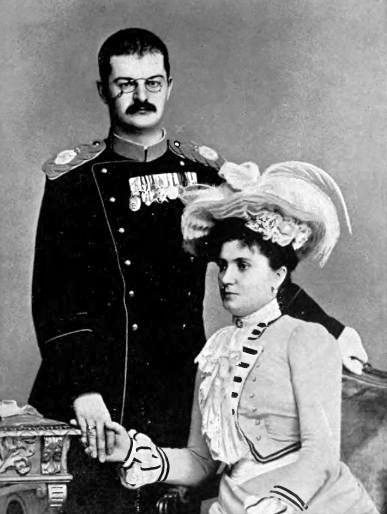
Queen Draga and King Alexander I, (circa 1900)

Despite Draga (aged 33) being ten years older than King Aleksandar, the couple married on 5 August 1900 in a formal ceremony. When Aleksandar announced their engagement, public opinion turned against him, viewing him as a besotted young fool in the power of a "wicked" seductress. Dowager Queen Natalija bitterly opposed the marriage, and was exiled by her son, in part because of her attitude. The King's many arbitrary and unpopular acts were blamed on Draga's influence. There were rumors that Aleksandar would name Draga's elder brother Nikodije Lunjevica as heir-presumptive to the throne. (Both her brothers were serving as army officers at the time of the marriage and appear to have been unpopular with their peers.)

The Queen Draga of Serbia's Decoration was instituted in her honour on 7 April 1902. This medal was awarded to ladies for "achieving meritorious charitable work".

== Assassination ==
The rumour concerning the royal succession led to the couple's assassination. On the night of 10–11 June 1903, a group of army officers invaded the royal palace, led by Colonel Dragutin Dimitrijević and others. Troops led by other officers involved in the conspiracy were deployed near the palace, and the royal guards did not offer effective resistance during the confusion after the electric lighting of the building was turned off. Initially, the conspirators were unable to find Aleksandar and Draga. However an aide of the king was captured and, either out of sympathy for the conspiracy or out of fear for his own life, revealed that they were hiding in a large built-in wardrobe of their bedroom.

Another account says that Aleksandar did not shut the secret door properly. Emerging partially dressed, the couple were murdered with sword thrusts and pistol shots by the officers, some of whom were reportedly drunk. The bodies were mutilated and afterwards thrown from a palace balcony onto piles of garden manure. Draga's two brothers, Nikodije and Nikola, were executed by firing squad on the same day. It was not until 19 June that the Lunjevica sisters, including the elder one Hristina Petrović with her children, left the country and settled permanently in Switzerland.

== Portrayals ==
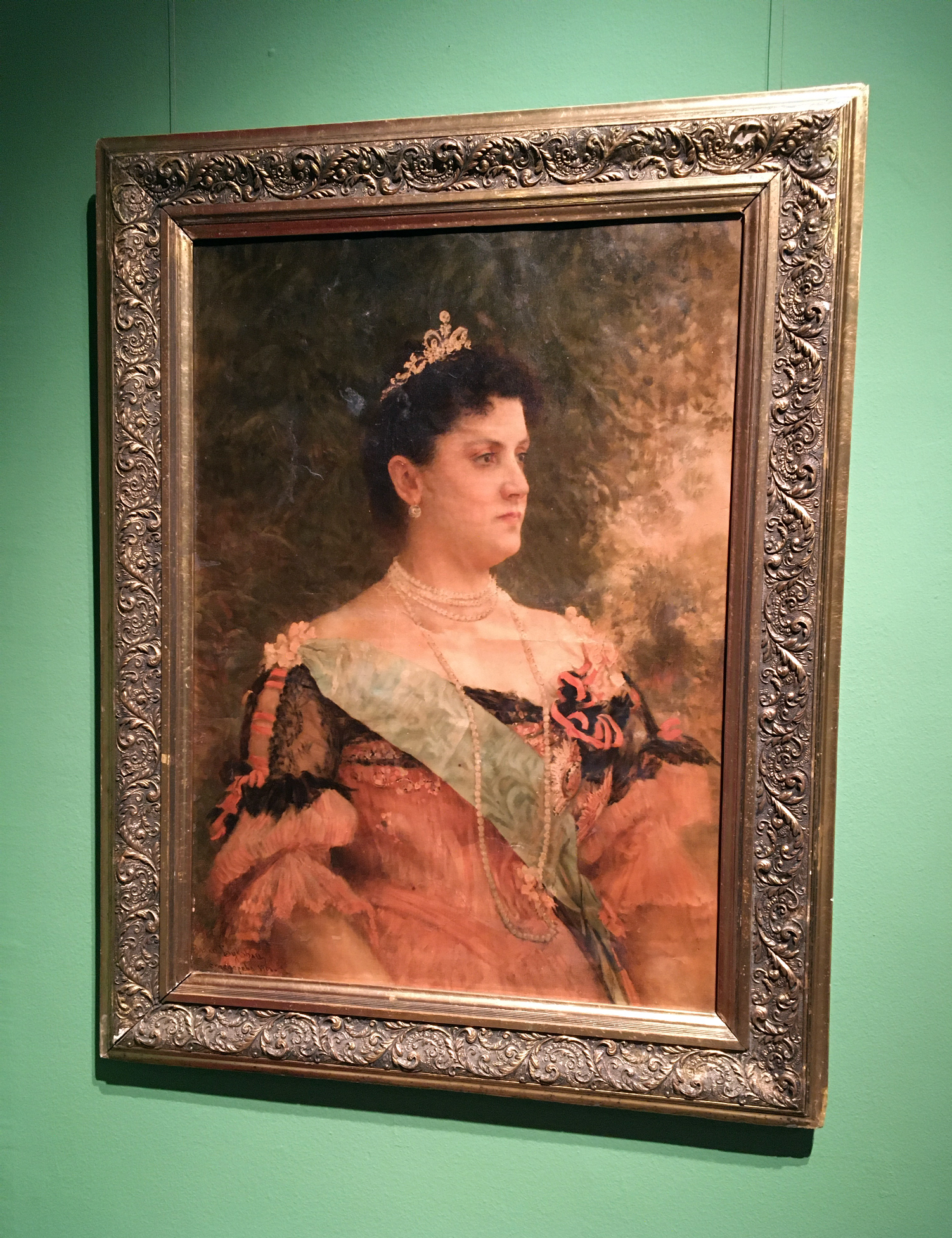
Vlaho Bukovac – queen Draga Obrenović, Museum of Rudnik-Takovo, 1901

Draga Mašin was played by Magda Sonja in the 1920 Austrian silent film Queen Draga and in the 1927 German silent film The Mistress of the Governor

In the 1932 American film A Woman Commands she was portrayed by Pola Negri.

She was also played by Ljiljana Blagojević in the 1995 Serbian mini-series The End of Obrenović Dynasty.

== Honours ==
National honours

- Dame Grand Cross of the Order of Miloš the Great (5 August 1900).
- Dame Grand Cross of the Order of the White Eagle (5 August 1900).

== Annotations ==
1. Her maiden name was Lunjevica (Луњевица), but she is and was most commonly known as Draga Mašin (Драга Машин), after her first marriage with Svetozar Mašin.
2. Hristina Lunjevica was married to Petar Petrović, a banker from Smederevo, later the director of the Belgrade Credit Bureau, with whom she had three children: sons Djordje and Mladen and daughter Jelena, who did not marry and did not start their own families in Switzerland, their final welcoming country.

== Sources ==
- Краљица Драга Обреновић. Zavod za Udžbenike. 2009. ISBN 978-86-17-16133-8.

Royal titles
Preceded by Natalija Keşco	Queen consort of Serbia; 5 August 1900 – 11 June 1903	Vacant Title next held by Maria of Yugoslavia as Queen of Serbs, Croats, and Slovenes
