= Nikola Lunjevica =

- Никола Милићевић Луњевица
- Born: 1767; Lunjevica, Sanjak of Smederevo, Ottoman Empire
- Died: 11 May 1842 (aged 74–75); Lunjevica, Principality of Serbia
- Military career
- Allegiance: Serbian Revolutionaries
- Service years: 1804–13
- Nickname: Lunjevica
- Conflicts: First Serbian Uprising (1804–13); Second Serbian Uprising (1815–1817)

Nikola Milićević (Serbian Cyrillic: Никола Милићевић, 1767 – 11 May 1842), known by his demonym as Nikola Lunjevica (Луњевица), was a Serbian Revolutionary and close comrade of Prince Miloš Obrenović I of Serbia. He was born in Lunjevica (hence his nickname), a village in the Sanjak of Smederevo, Ottoman Empire (now Serbia). He was relative of Princess Ljubica of Serbia, father of Serbian politician Panta Lunjevica (1840–1887) and grandfather of Draga, the Queen consort of Serbia (1900–1903).

== Biography ==
Nikola Milićević was born in the village of Lunjevica in 1767, after which he was called Lunjevica. At the end of the 18th century, he was very well known as a rich merchant in his region, but also in the areas across the Sava. He especially multiplied his wealth through trade with Zemun merchants who procured food and livestock for the Austrian army. "A man seen in this way could not help but go with his loyal men, the people of Rudnica, into battle when the time came to fight for liberation...", the chroniclers recorded.

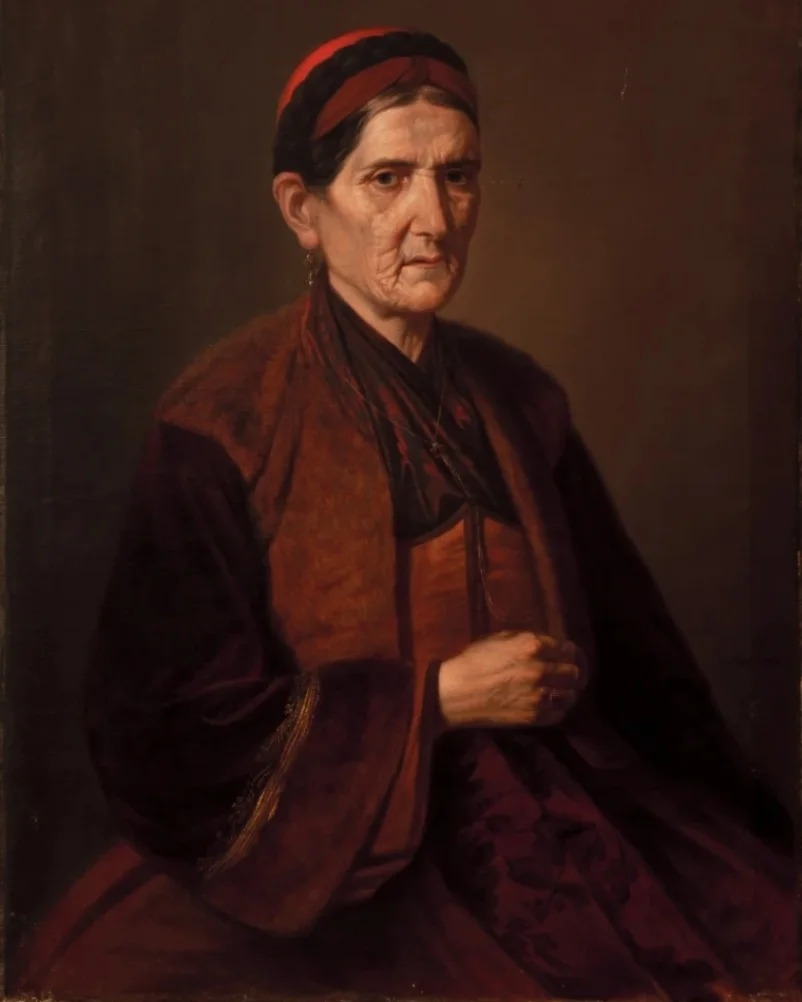
Nikola's fourth wife: Djurdjija Čarapić (1804-1881), member of the Čarapić family (1874)

Nikola Lunjevica was considered a man of wise counsel in his community, and with financial resources and commercial knowledge, he also helped with the procurement of ammunition for the Serbian insurgent army.

Despite the fact that he was never included in the ranks of the insurgent elders, he is remembered for the fact that he generously helped the insurgents in the beginnings of the Serbian revolution, both in the First and the Second Uprising.

During both uprisings, he cooperated well with Duke Miloš Obrenović. Nikola was Miloš's comrade, and also his wife Ljubica's blood relative. Their contemporary, Sima Milutinović Sarajlija, indicates that Duke Miloš, coming from Takovo, where the uprising was arranged, found a horse load full of thalers at home in Crnuć, which was given to him by the landlord Nikola Milićević from the village of Lunjevica.

The personality of Nikola Lunjevica was also recorded in the case when Duke Milan Obrenović left for Bucharest in 1810. He then handed Nikola Lunjevica eight hundred golden "rupshis" (rubles) with a request that he, in the event of Milan's death, hand them over to his son Rista. When both Milan and Rista died, Nikola Lunjevica went to the court of Prince Miloš Obrenović and handed him a sealed envelope with money entrusted to him for safekeeping.

During the reign of Prince Miloš Obrenović, Nikola Lunjevica was the president of the District Court of Rudnik. He was known as an involved and fair judge who was very lenient and forgiving.

Lunjevica is best remembered for having founded the first private school in Serbia and in Europe, and rebuilding the Vujan Monastery, where he was buried after his death on 11 (23 Gregorian Calendar) May 1842.

Due to circumstances, the granddaughter of Nikola Lunjevica, Draga Mašin, became the tragic Queen of Serbia by marrying King Aleksandar Obrenović. His daughter from his first marriage was the wife of Danilo Stefanović, who served as the Prime Minister of Serbia, while her half-sister, Jelena Lena Pavlović, née Lunjevica (1832-1913) was mother of Ivan S. Pavlović, Divisional general of Royal Yugoslav Army.

== See also ==
- List of Serbian Revolutionaries

== Sources ==
- Vrbavac, Đorđe (1903) [1901]. Никола Милићевић Луњевица.
- Stevanović, Miladin (1990). Drugi srpski ustanak. Dečje novine. ISBN 978-86-367-0339-7.
