= Lozanj =

- Village
- Location within Serbia
- Coordinates: 44°05′08″N 20°17′10″E
- Country: Serbia
- District: Moravica District
- Municipality: Gornji Milanovac

Population (2002)
  - Total: 340
- Time zone: UTC+1 (CET)
  - Summer (DST): UTC+2 (CEST)

Lozanj is a village in the municipality of Gornji Milanovac, Serbia. According to the 2002 census, the village has a population of 340 people.

The village was active in the Serbian Revolution, being organized into the knežina (administrative unit) of Brusnica (Takovo) during the First Serbian Uprising (1804–13). The local Dobrica Vesković participated in the uprising.
