= Cerova, Gornji Milanovac =

Cerova Церова
- Village
- Location within Serbia
- Coordinates: 44°08′N 20°27′E
- Country: Serbia
- District: Moravica District
- Municipality: Gornji Milanovac

Population (2002)
  - Total: 112
- Time zone: UTC+1 (CET)
  - Summer (DST): UTC+2 (CEST)

Cerova is a village in the municipality of Gornji Milanovac, Serbia. According to the 2002 census, the village has a population of 112 people.
