= Družetići =

- Village
- Location within Serbia
- Coordinates: 44°01′39″N 20°09′19″E
- Country: Serbia
- District: Moravica District
- Municipality: Gornji Milanovac

Population (2002)
  - Total: 703
- Time zone: UTC+1 (CET)
  - Summer (DST): UTC+2 (CEST)

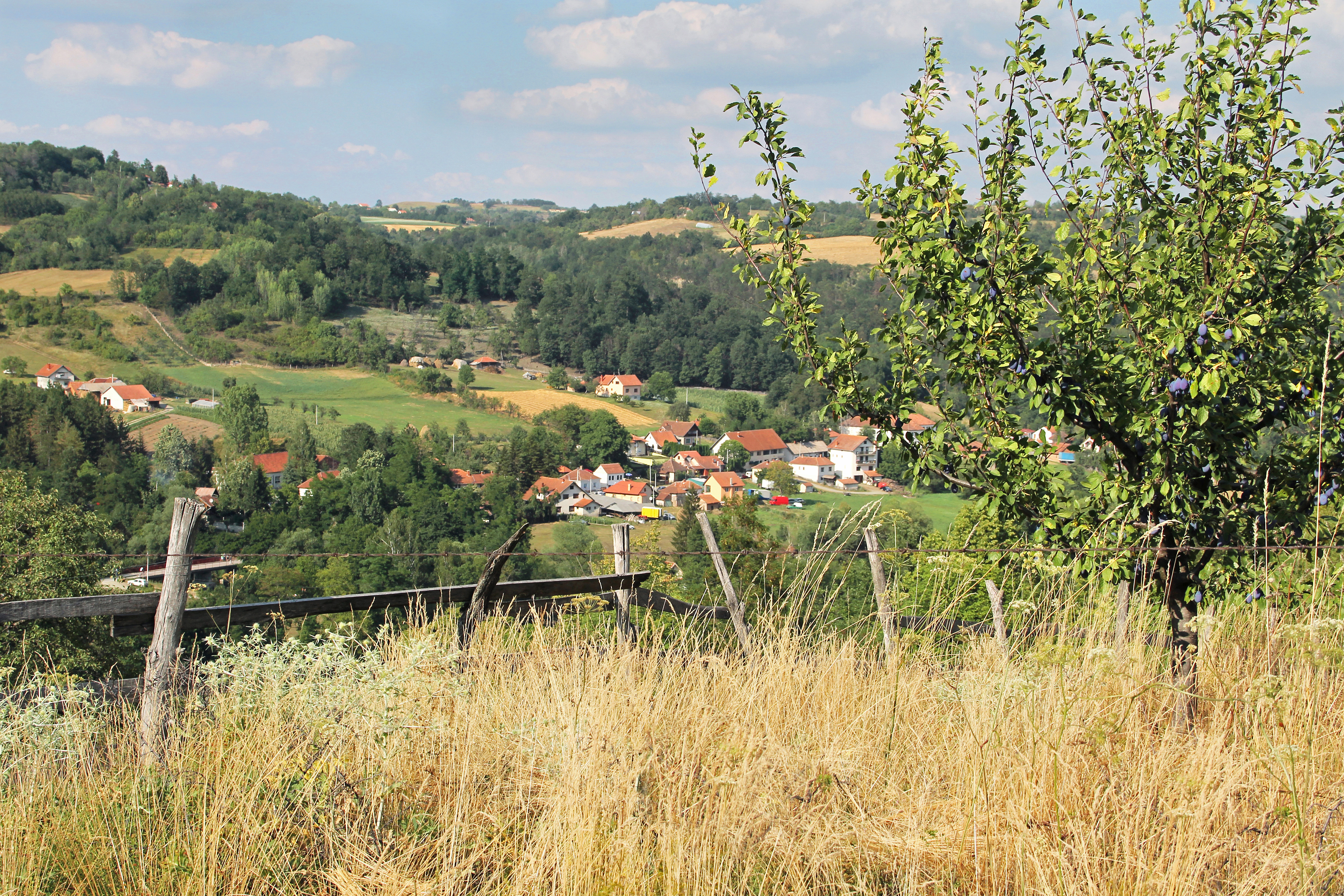

Družetići is a village in the municipality of Gornji Milanovac, Serbia. According to the 2002 census, the village has a population of 703 people.
