= Bogdanica =

- Village
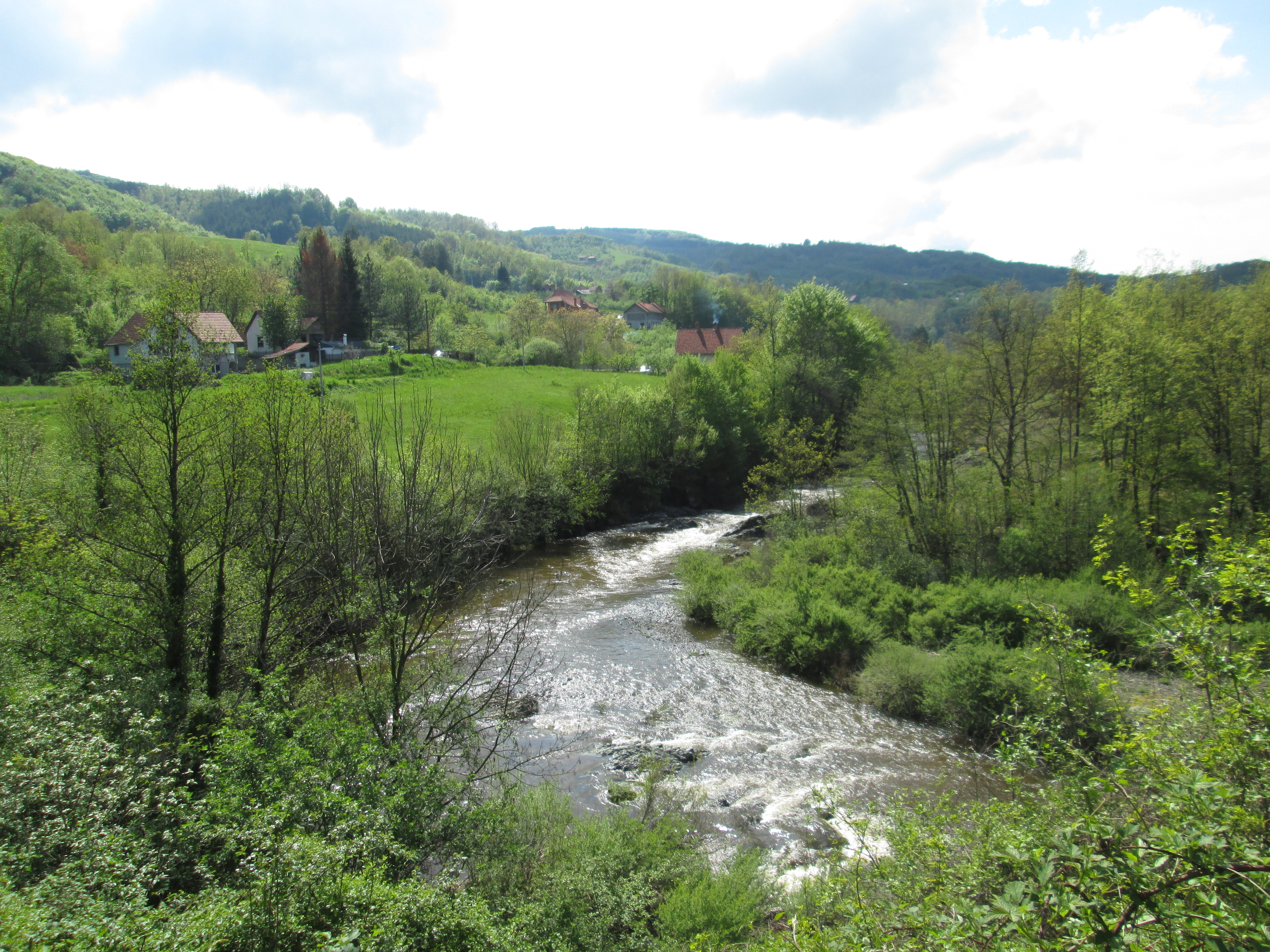

- Location within Serbia
- Coordinates: 44°00′55″N 20°06′18″E
- Country: Serbia
- District: Moravica District
- Municipality: Gornji Milanovac

Population (2002)
  - Total: 312
- Time zone: UTC+1 (CET)
  - Summer (DST): UTC+2 (CEST)

Bogdanica is a village in the municipality of Gornji Milanovac, Serbia. According to the 2002 census, the village has a population of 312 people.
