= Lipovac, Gornji Milanovac =

Lipovac Липовац
- Village
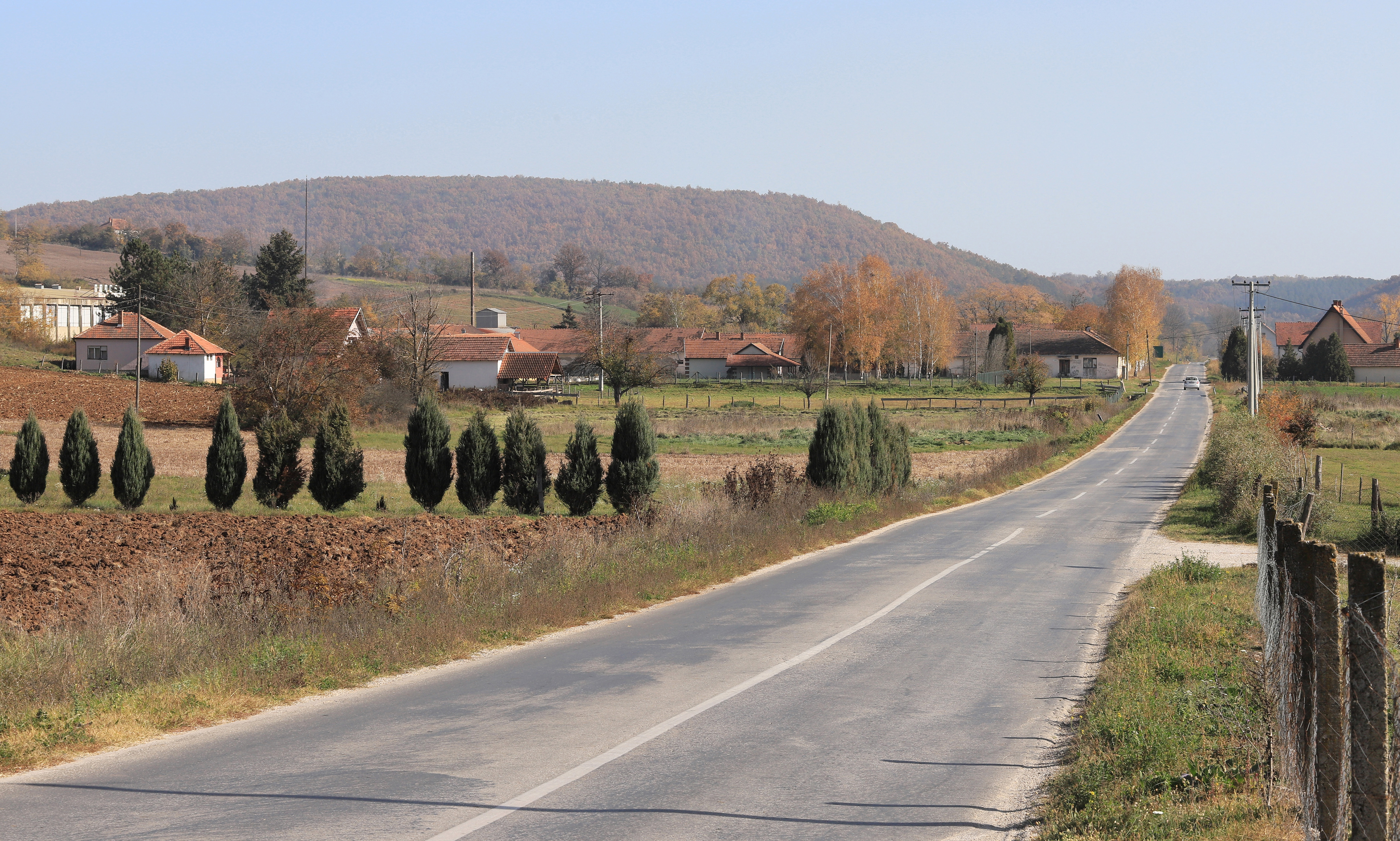
- Gornjeg Milanovca

- Location within Serbia
- Coordinates: 44°03′N 20°38′E
- Country: Serbia
- District: Moravica District
- Municipality: Gornji Milanovac

Population (2002)
  - Total: 304
- Time zone: UTC+1 (CET)
  - Summer (DST): UTC+2 (CEST)

Lipovac is a village in the municipality of Gornji Milanovac, Serbia. According to the 2002 census, the village has a population of 304 people.
