= Belo Polje, Gornji Milanovac =

Belo Polje Бело Поље
- Village
- Location within Serbia
- Coordinates: 44°01′N 20°36′E
- Country: Serbia
- District: Moravica District
- Municipality: Gornji Milanovac

Population (2002)
  - Total: 256
- Time zone: UTC+1 (CET)
  - Summer (DST): UTC+2 (CEST)

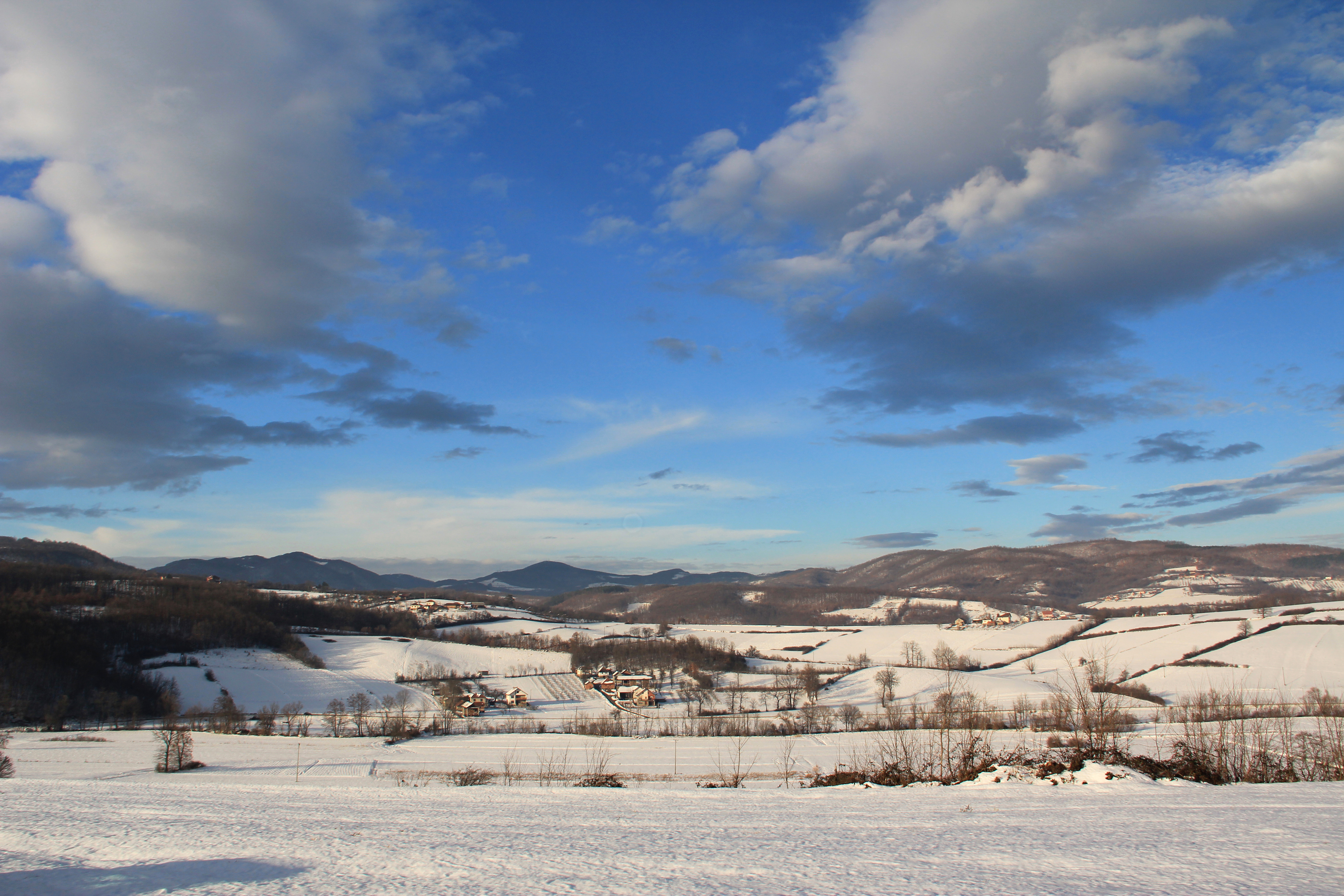
Belo Polje, Gornji Milanovac

Belo Polje is a village in the municipality of Gornji Milanovac, Serbia. According to the 2002 census, the village has a population of 256 people.
