= Gornji Milanovac =

Gornji Milanovac Горњи Милановац (Serbian) Despotovica
- Town and municipality
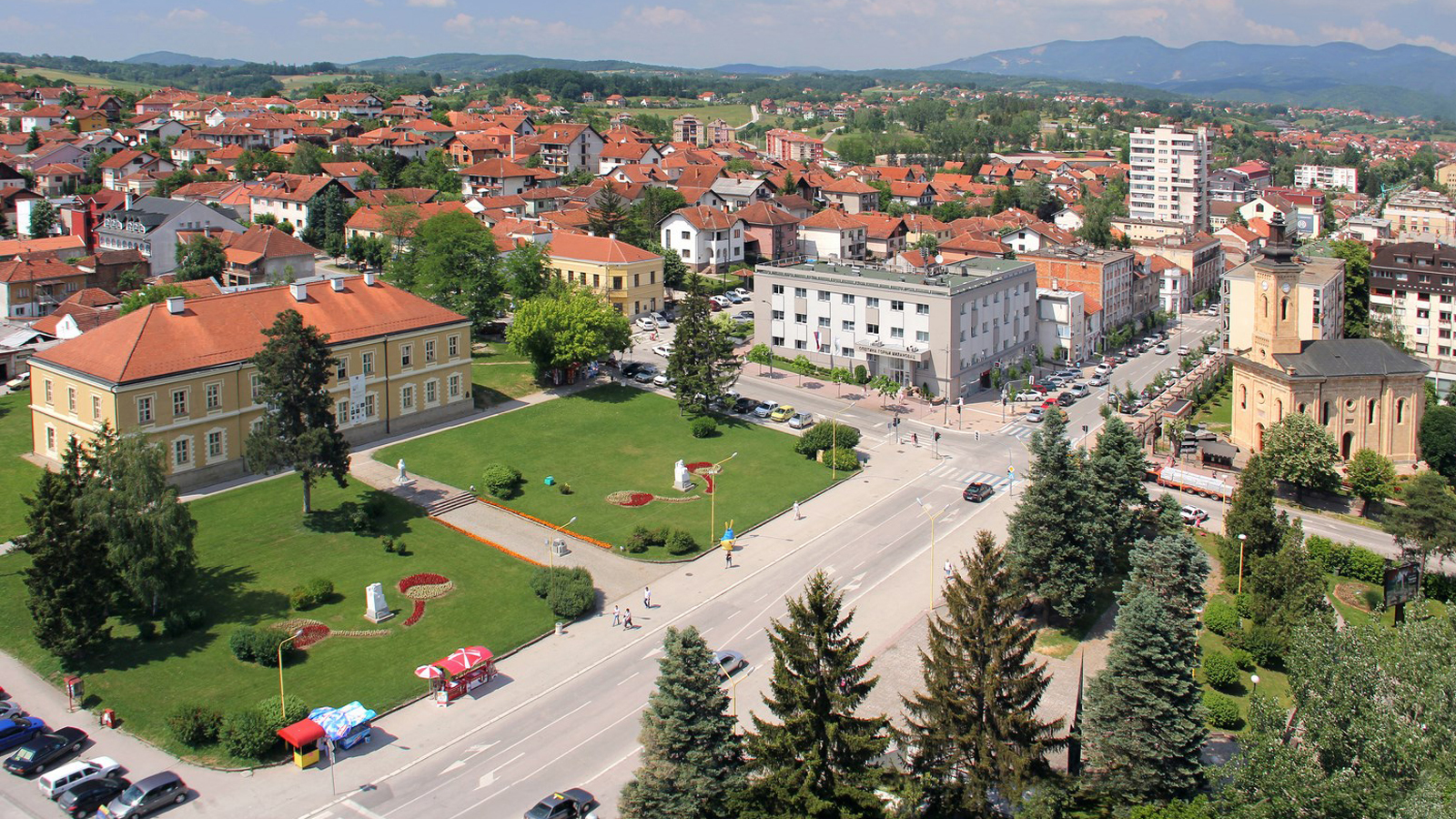
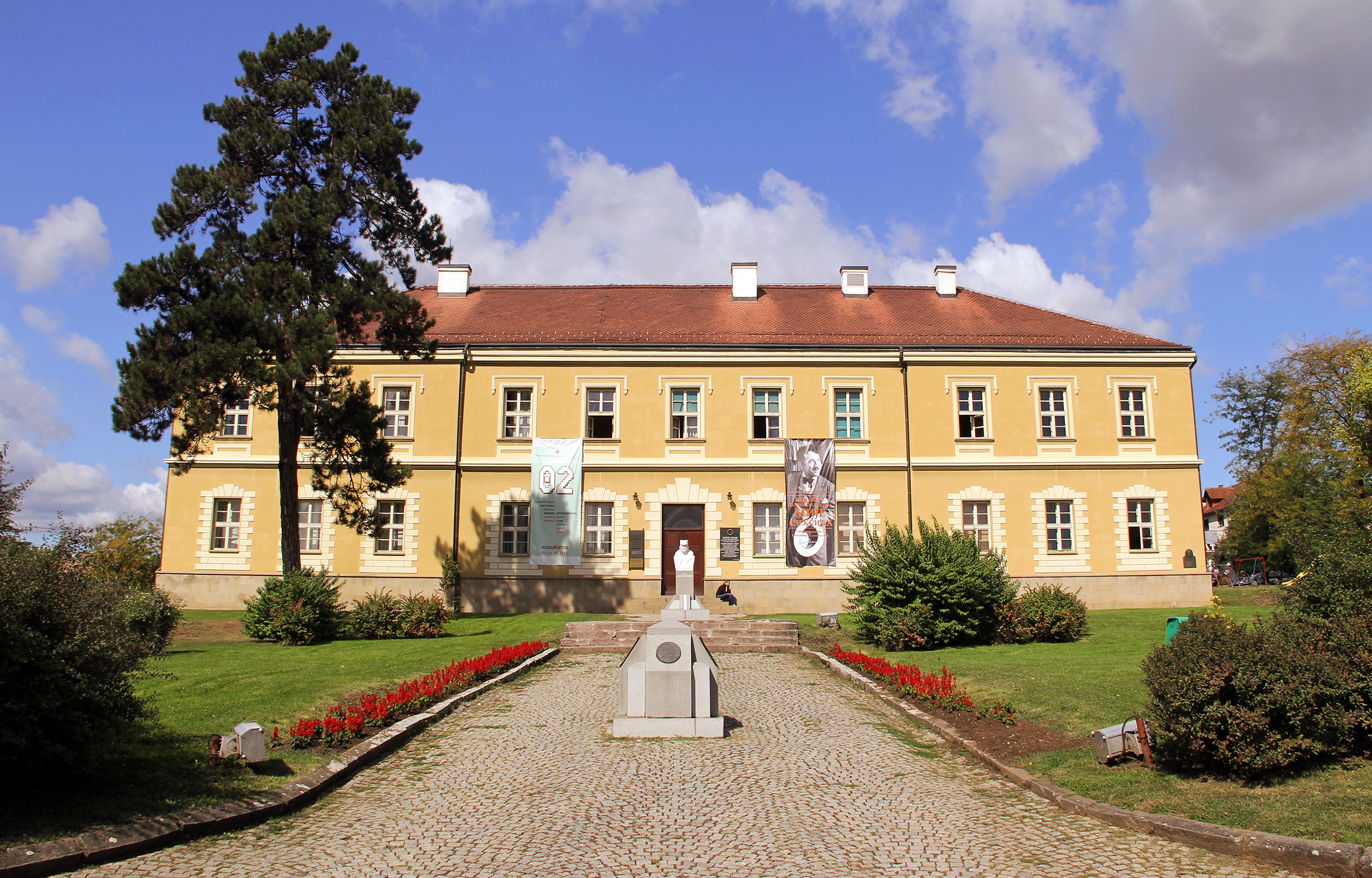
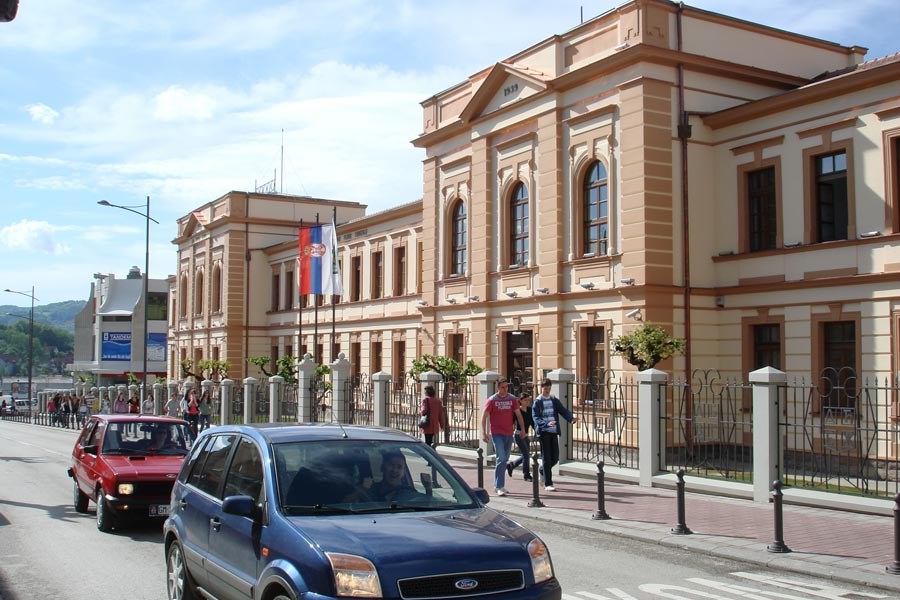
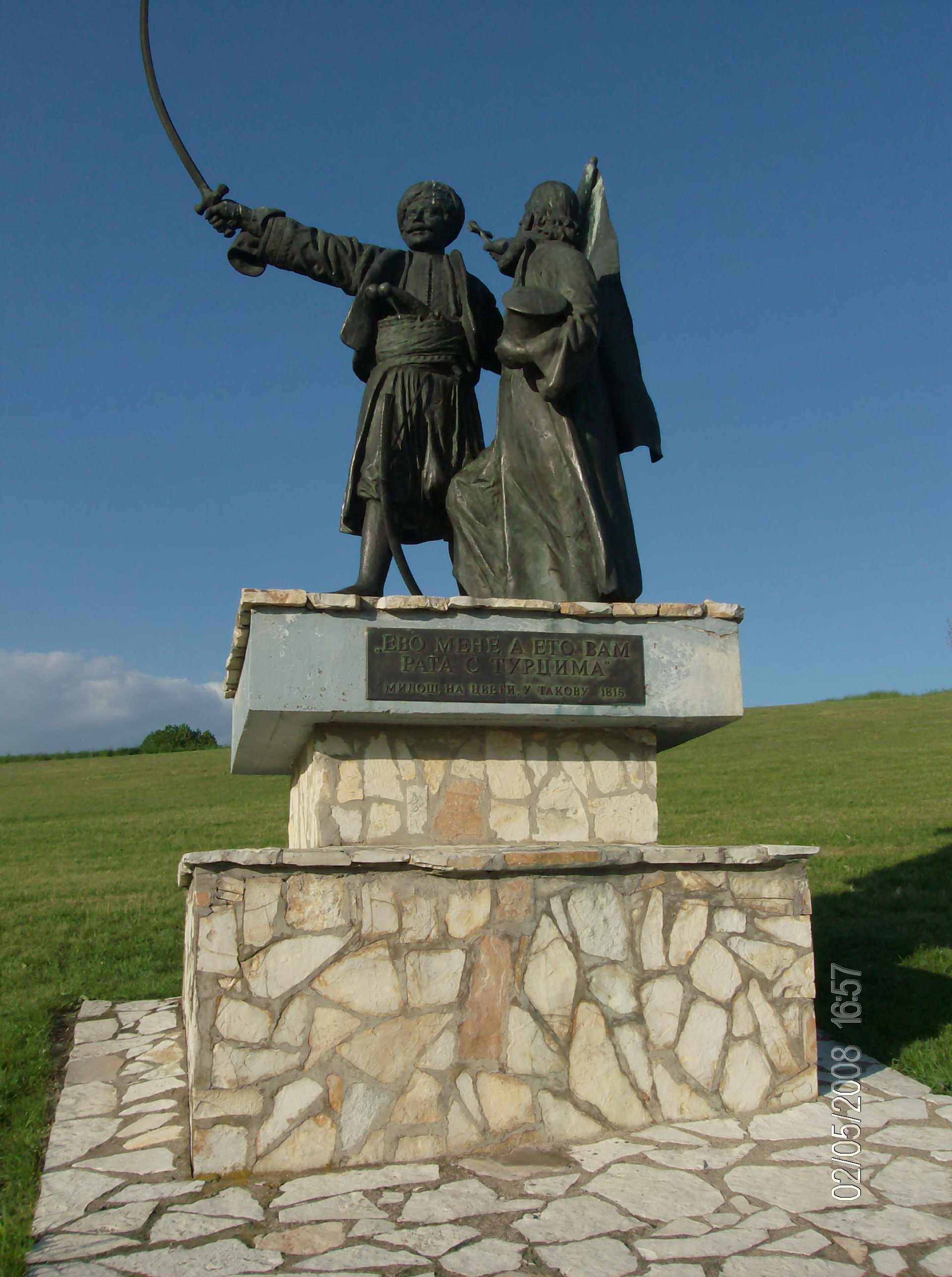
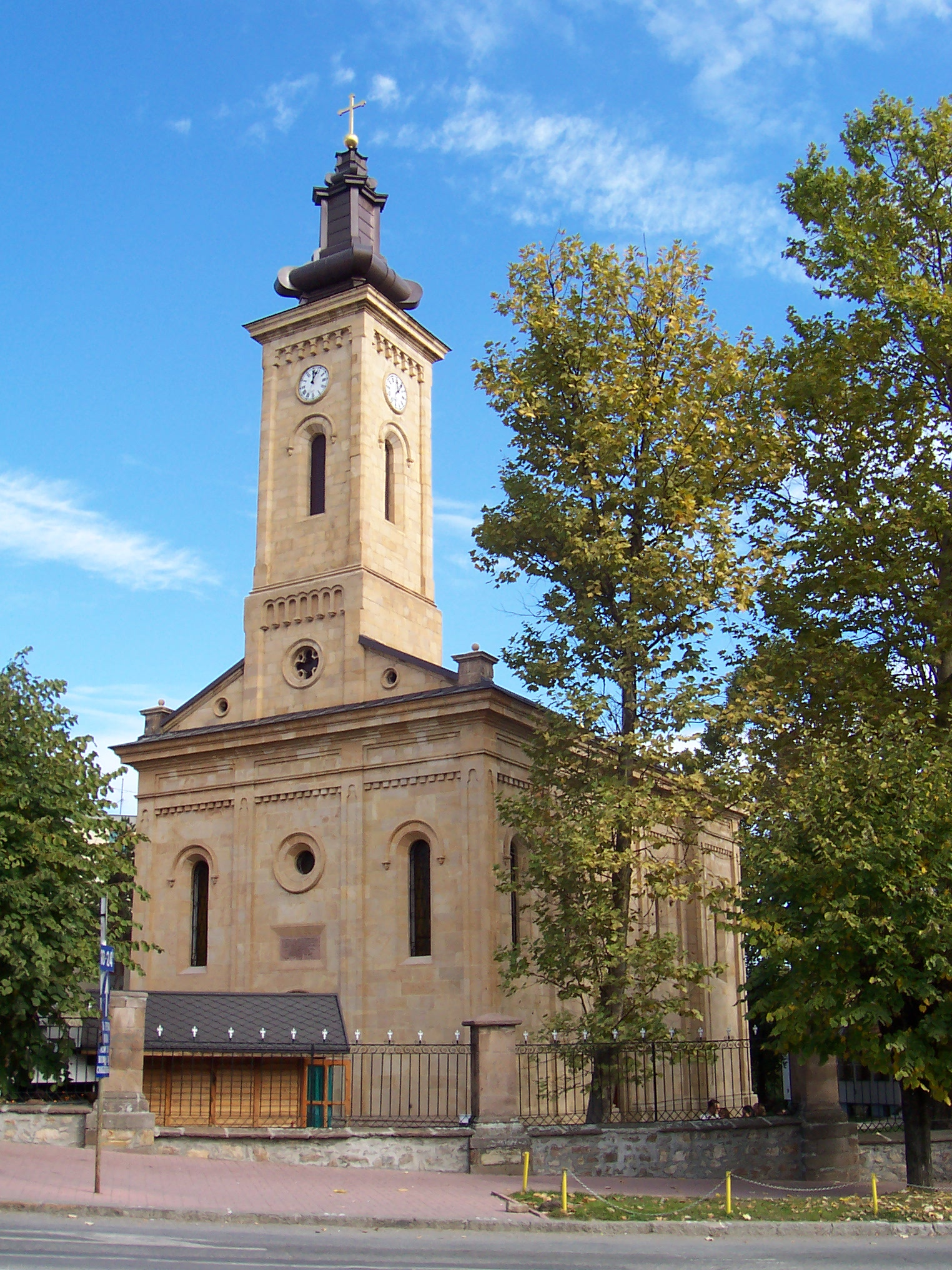
- From top: Town center, The Old Court building, Takovski ustanak gymnasium, "Takovski grm" Memorial Complex, Church of Holy Trinity

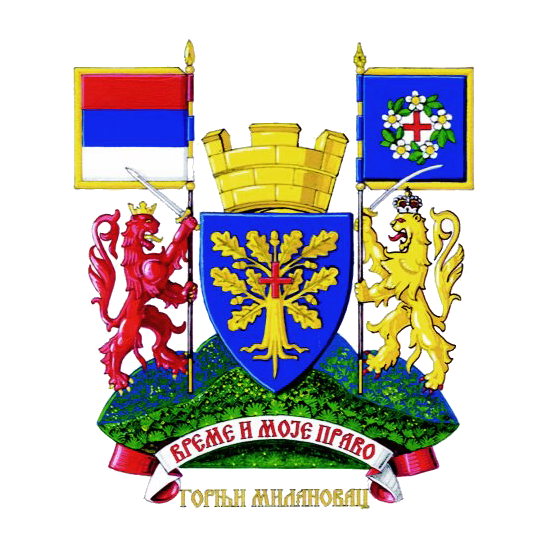
- Coat of arms
- Motto(s): "Време и моје право (Time and my right)"
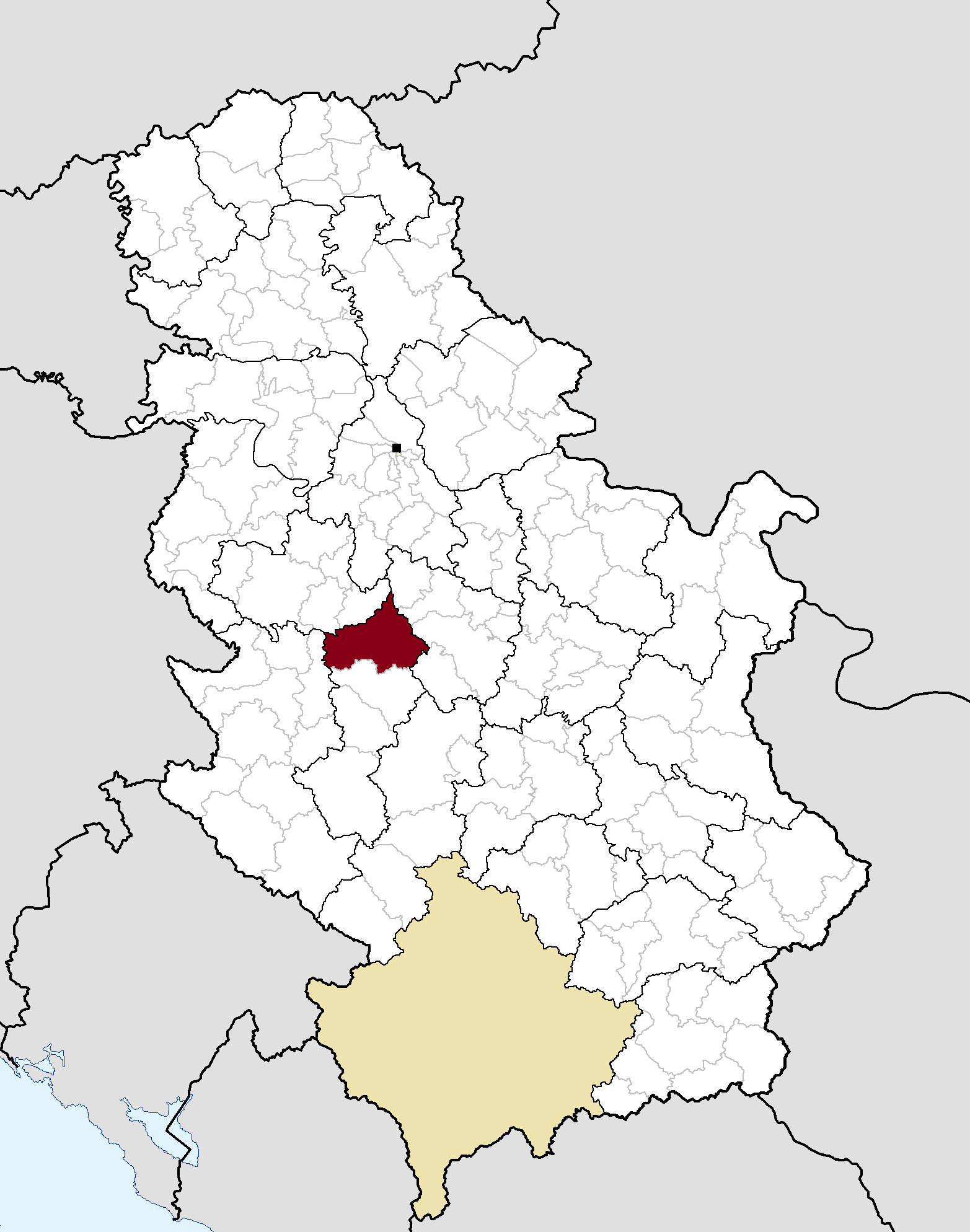
- Location of the municipality of Gornji Milanovac within Serbia
- Coordinates: 44°01′27″N 20°27′36″E
- Country: Serbia
- Region: Šumadija and Western Serbia
- District: Moravica
- Founded: 1853
- Settlements: 63

Government
  - Mayor: Dejan Kovačević (SNS)

Area
  - Rank: 21st in Serbia
  - Town: 16.84 km^{2} (6.50 sq mi)
  - Municipality: 836 km^{2} (323 sq mi)
- Elevation: 310 m (1,020 ft)

Population (2022 census)
  - Rank: 32nd in Serbia
  - Town: 23,109
  - Town density: 1,372/km^{2} (3,554/sq mi)
  - Municipality: 44,238
  - Municipality density: 52.9/km^{2} (137/sq mi)
- Time zone: UTC+1 (CET)
  - Summer (DST): UTC+2 (CEST)
- Postal code: 32300; 32301
- Area code: +381(0)32
- Car plates: GM
- Website: www.gornjimilanovac.rs

Gornji Milanovac (Serbian Cyrillic: Гoрњи Милановац, pronounced [ɡôːrɲiː mǐlanoʋats]) is a town and municipality located in the Moravica District of central Serbia. The population of the town is 23,109, while the population of the municipality is 38,985 (2022 census data).

The town was founded in 1853 as Despotovica (Деспотовица), after the river passing by the town. In 1859 the name was changed to Gornji Milanovac at the request of Prince Miloš Obrenović. Its name means Upper Milanovac (there is a Lower Milanovac as well, while Milanovac was named so in honour of revolutionary Milan Obrenović).

The microregion of Rudnik–Takovo (Serbian: Рудничко-таковски крај), or simply Takovo (Serbian: Таково, Таковски крај), in the broader sense roughly corresponds to the modern municipality of Gornji Milanovac. It includes the southern foothills of the Rudnik mountain, and northern foothills of Suvobor and Maljen. Some villages in the municipality are part of the Kačer region.

== History ==
=== Prehistory ===
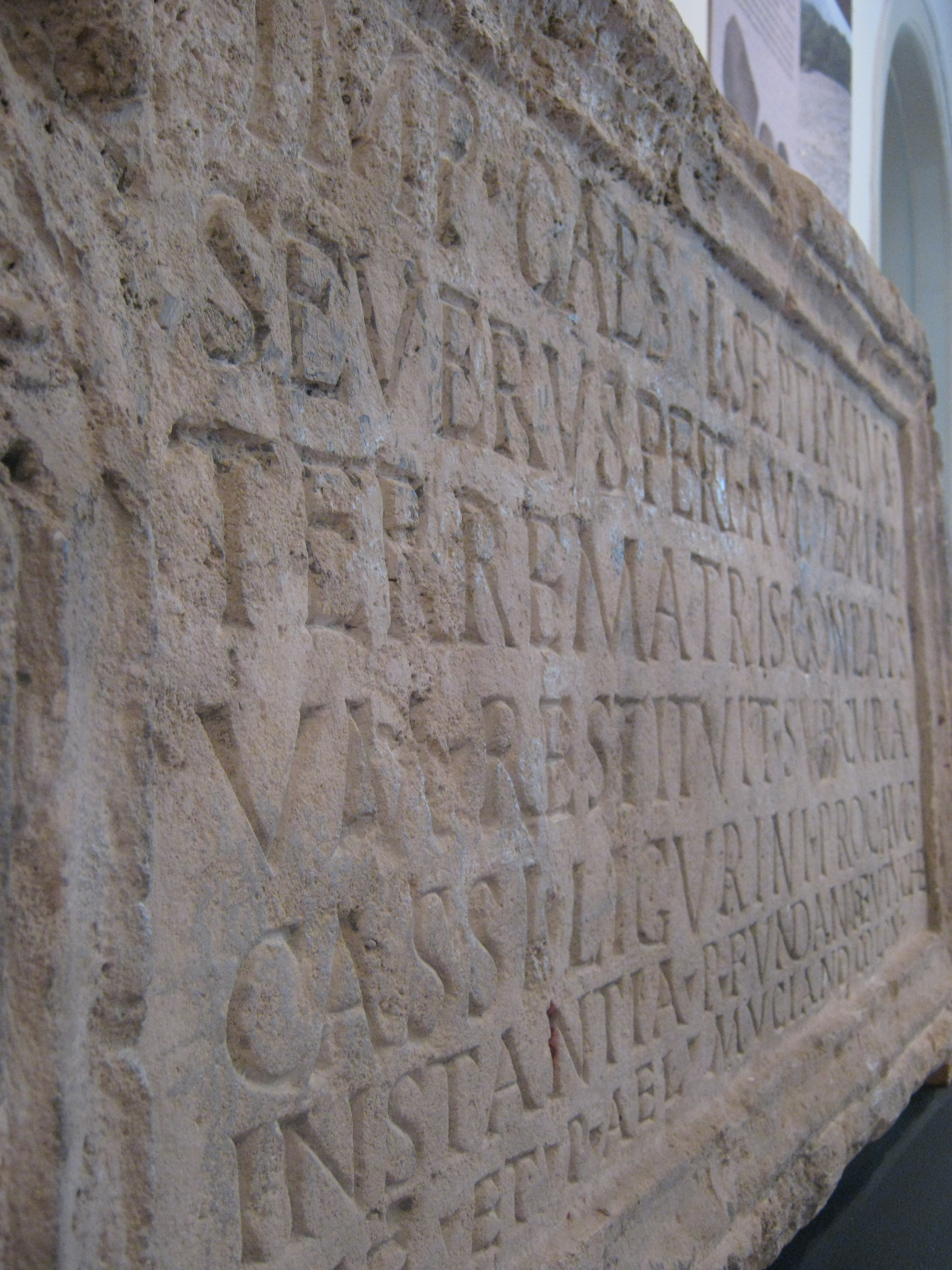
Roman inscription found on mount Rudnik.

The area of Gornji Milanovac was inhabited by Paleo-Balkan peoples and smaller groups of Celts and Goths in antiquity. There were later Roman settlements in the area. On the mountain Rudnik, besides older miners grove there are remains of a Roman temple dedicated to the Terra Mater ("Mother Earth"). Neolithic sites exist in Gojna Gora and Rudnik.

=== Middle Ages ===
There are ruins and sites of Byzantine, Serbian and Ottoman origin on mountain Rudnik, in villages Brusnica, mountain Treska, Jablanica, and Gornji Milanovac parts of the mountain Vujan.

=== 19th century ===
The Rudnik nahiya had included two knežina (Christian self-governing village groups) prior to 1804, the Crna Gora–Podgora (which included what is later known as the Takovo area), and the Rudnička Morava (area from Vujan to Western Morava); with the First Serbian Uprising (1804–13), the Kačer knežina was organized, including the northern and western foothills of Rudnik to the eastern part of the Jasenica river, and the Lazić's knežina (Lazićeva knežina), headed by Jovan Lazić-Kozeljac, which included twelve villages in the Takovo area. From 1823, Lazić's knežina was known as Brusnica (Брусница, Брусничка) after its seat at Brusnica. It was later organized as a srez of the Principality of Serbia, part of the Rudnik okrug.

The Rudnik nahiya was liberated at the start of the uprising. The villages of what later became Brusnica/Takovo involved in the uprising were Brusnica, Teočin, Lunjevica, Beršići, Brezna, Svračkovci, Lozanj, Ozrem, Srezojevci, Majdan, Takovo, Leušići, Klatičevo, Ljutovnica, Velereč, Koštunići, Grabovica, Gornji Branetići, Ločevci, Nakučani, Sinoševići, Brajići, Ručići, Šarani, Nevade, Ljevaja, Polom, Pranjani. Among the most notable participants in the Serbian Revolution that hailed from Brusnica/Takovo were the Obrenović family (Milan, Jovan, Miloš) from Brusnica; Milić Drinčić from Teočin; Nikola Lunjevica; Vasa Popović from Beršići; Jovan Lazić from Svračkovci; Jovan Vukomanović from Srezojevci.

At the Takovo Meeting on 23 April 1815, the Serbian rebels decided to rise up once again. They chose vojvoda Miloš Obrenović to lead them against the Ottoman Empire.

Initially, the settlement that was to become Gornji Milanovac (before 1853) was situated in the area of today's village Brusnica. There was some discussion about the suitability of the site for a settlement. In 1852 Despotovica becomes the first town in Serbia with a completed map of the city and with the streets at an angle of 90°. The new municipality was to be called Despotovac after the river Despotovica which passes through this municipality (the river name originates from the Serbian despot, Đurađ Branković). On 22 April 1852, Despotovac (later Gornji Milanovac) was then relocated to a place called Divlje Polje. This decision was taken by Mladen Žujović, Trivun Novaković, Stevan Knićanin, and Gaja Riznić. Notable buildings and roads (for example: "Zgrada starog suda – Old Court building") are the work of German engineer Indižir Schultz from Pančevo. In 1853 the municipality of Despotovica was established. Today's name Gornji Milanovac was formalized by the warrant of Miloš Obrenović I, Prince of Serbia, in 1859, after his brother Milan Obrenović. The town primary school and library were established in 1857, while the high school was established in 1879. A printing company was opened in 1890. A county hospital was opened in 1892.

=== Contemporary ===
In the World War I occupation, the population in Gornji Milanovac was subjected to war terror and crimes by the forces of Austria-Hungary, German Empire and Bulgaria, while during World War II the infrastructure was destroyed and the population of this town suffered as before. At the time of sanctions and breakup of Yugoslavia, the industry of municipality exported their products to the Western and Eastern markets through offshore companies. In the 1999 NATO bombing of Yugoslavia, Gornji Milanovac was bombed once (only television repeater was damaged). People from nearby towns and municipalities in-joke said, that when NATO planned which town to bomb, they put a cup of coffee at the Gornji Milanovac location on the map.

- 1912– commencement of construction of narrow-gauge railway;
- 1914– during the First World War in this town was settled headquarters of Živojin Mišić;
- 1921– finished electrification and construction of low voltage network;
- 1922– started with work of the narrow gauge railway and establishment of the first conditory company "Rudnik";
- 1923– first coal power plant;
- 1927– first X-ray machine;
- 1928– started with work of the first cinema in a municipality;
- 1933– HRH King Alexander I of Yugoslavia opens first mixed primary school;
- 1937– The establishment of the second factory of conditory products "Sumadija";
- 1941– Yugoslav Partisans and Yugoslav army in homeland (known as Chetniks) in joint action release Gornji Milanovac from the Nazi- German occupation. Gornji Milanovac was merged with the other released towns in occupied Kingdom of Yugoslavia and formed short-lived Republic of Užice. At the head of that joint action was Zvonimir Vučković. During that battle two German tanks were trapped and now one of those is a monument on the exit from the town in village Nevade, while the other is a monument in Užice (Hotchkiss H35);
- 1945– Gornji Milanovac was released from Nazi-German occupation and began industrialization
- 1965– two municipalities Pranjani and Rudnik merged to Gornji Milanovac.

== Culture and tourism ==
=== Cultural monuments ===
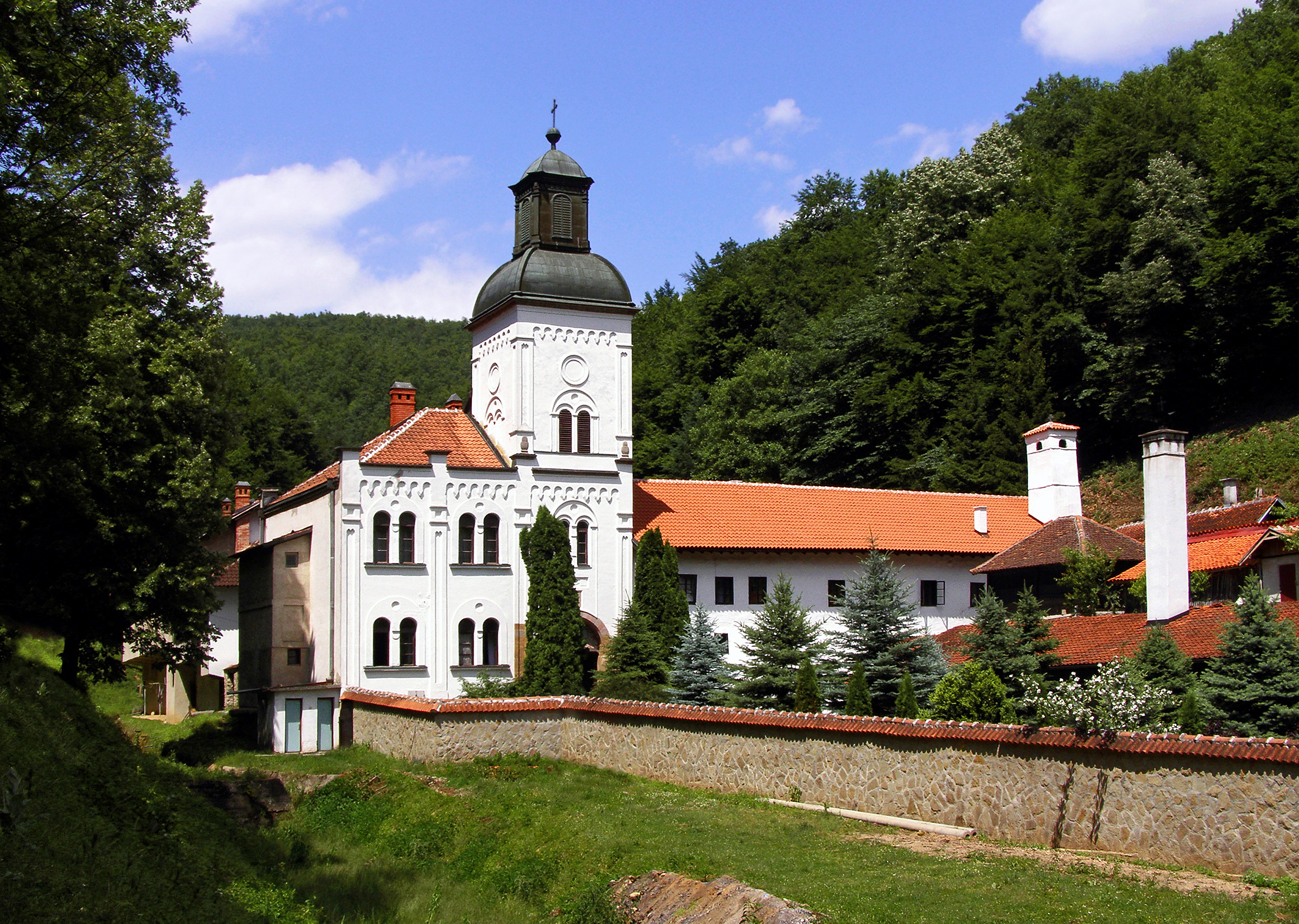
Serbian Orthodox monastery in Vraćevšnica, built in 1428–29

Cultural Monuments of Great Importance in Gornji Milanovac are:

- Church of the Holy Trinity.
- Church of St. Nicholas in the village of Brusnica and the family tomb of Obrenović dynasty.
- District Building ("The Old Court building").
- Monuments in the center of the municipality.
- "Hill of Peace" (Brdo mira) Memorial Park.
- Tank as a monument of liberation in Nevade from the Second World War (Sherman Firefly).
- Orthodox Christian monasteries of Vraćevšnica, Šilopaj and Vujan.
- Takovo complex devoted to the heroes from Second Serbian Uprising.
- Ruins of Orthodox monasteries "Ješevac", Catholic church "Misa" (later mosque) on Rudnik.
- Ruins of Irene Kantakouzene on Treska Hill.
- Family house of Miloš Obrenović in Gornja Crnuća.
- Family house of national hero Dragan Jeftić-Škepo.
- Family house of the Lunjevica family (Revolutionary Nikola, politician Panta and Queen consort Draga Obrenović).
- Family house of Djordjevic built in old Serbian architectural style.
- Family house and inheritance of Archibald Reiss's son- "Dobro polje II".
- Monument on city cemetery of fallen soldiers of Austro-Hungary and Serbian Army in World War I.
- Monument for the participants in Operation Halyard and the other monuments in the rest of municipality.

=== Culture institutions ===
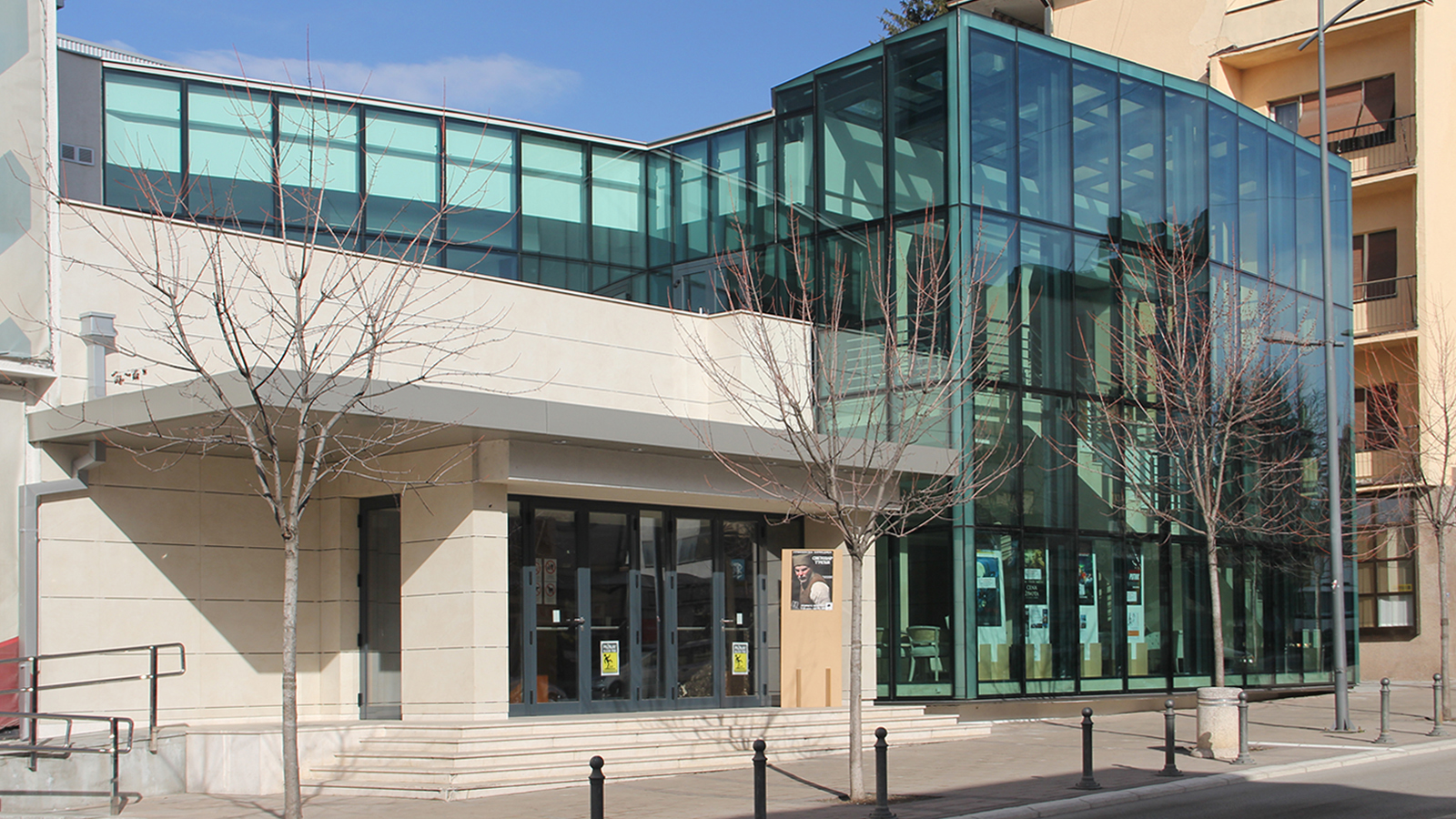
Culture center "Mija Aleksić"

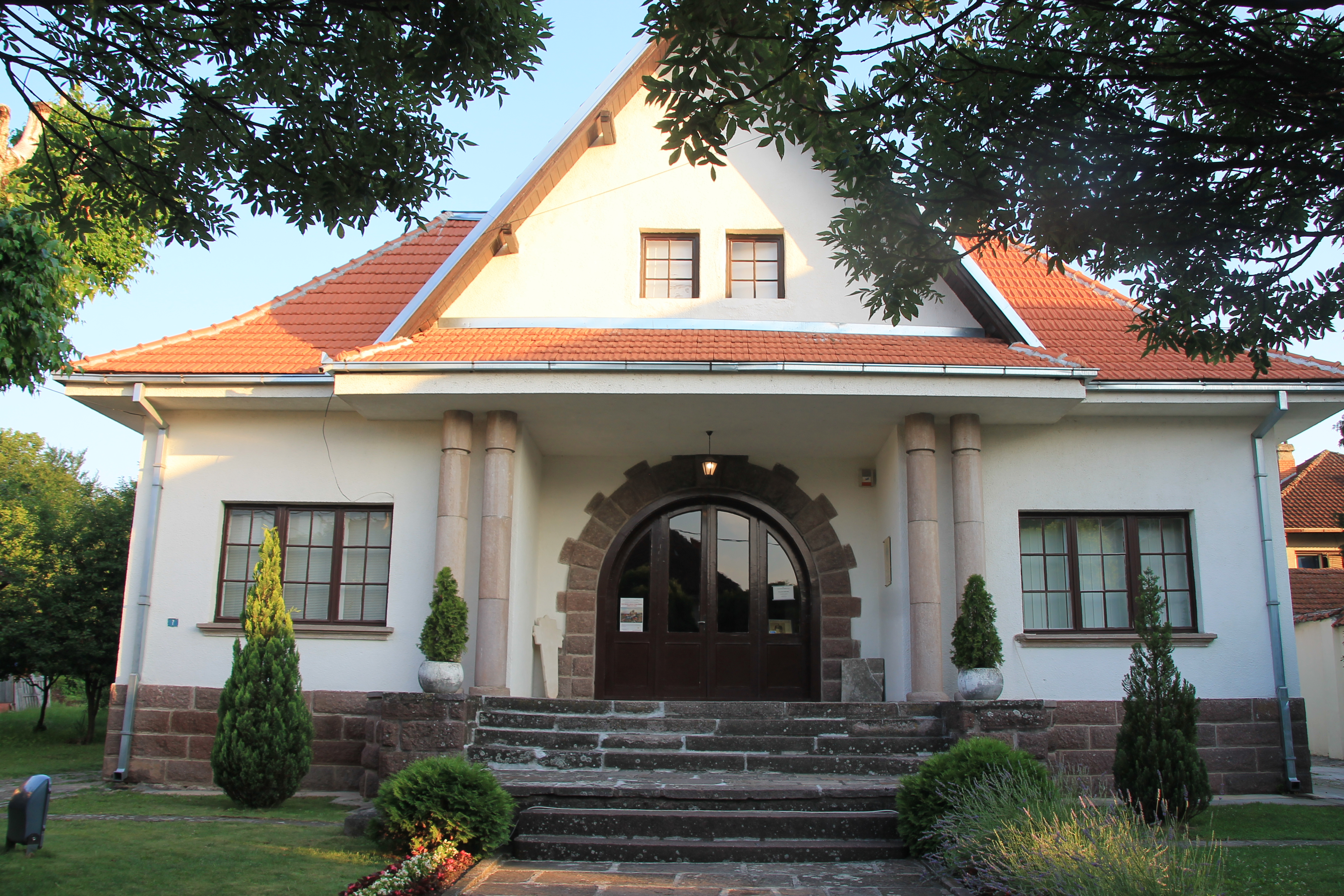
Museum of Rudnik and Takovo area in Gornji Milanovac

The first library in Gornji Milanovac was established in 1857 and is called "Braća Nastasijević" (English: "Brothers Nastasijević"). Headquarters is in the building of Old District Administration. It has separate classes in Rudnik (the oldest), Pranjani, Brdjani, and Vraćešnica. Librarian fond has over 100,000 books. Also "Braća Nastasijević" library is engaged in the publishing business.

The main theater in this municipality is "Milanovačko amatersko pozorište (Milanovac amateur theater)". Milanovac amateur theater, GM cinema, art gallery and administrative center of all settlements cultural clubs has headquarters in the center of municipality witch satisfy modern standards for one cultural institution. In the area of photography and cinema, Gornji Milanovac is represented with a big number of art members of the Photo-cinema club Gornji Milanovac.

The Museum of Rudnik and Takovo area is a subsidiary of the culture center of Gornji Milanovac. It has established the Gallerie of Arts in 2008, and a modern gallery in the building of old district administration.

=== Music and folklore ===
In this municipality there are two folklore groups: "Tipoplastika"-Folklore ensemble and Culture-Arts Community "Šumadija". There are also rock bends that were established in this town, like: "Bjesovi", "An Fas", ″Pastir Pan″, "GM Undergrounders", "Skarlet" and "Čudna Šuma". As for punk-rock bands in '90s and 80's there are: "Trula koalicija", In '00s there were established new rock and reggae music bands and groups: "Plišani mališan", "Morbid Cow", "Parnasus", "Strah od Džeki Čena", IMT 666 (Featuring Bjesovi band's singers child, Stevan Marinkovic), etc.

=== Tourism, ecology and events ===
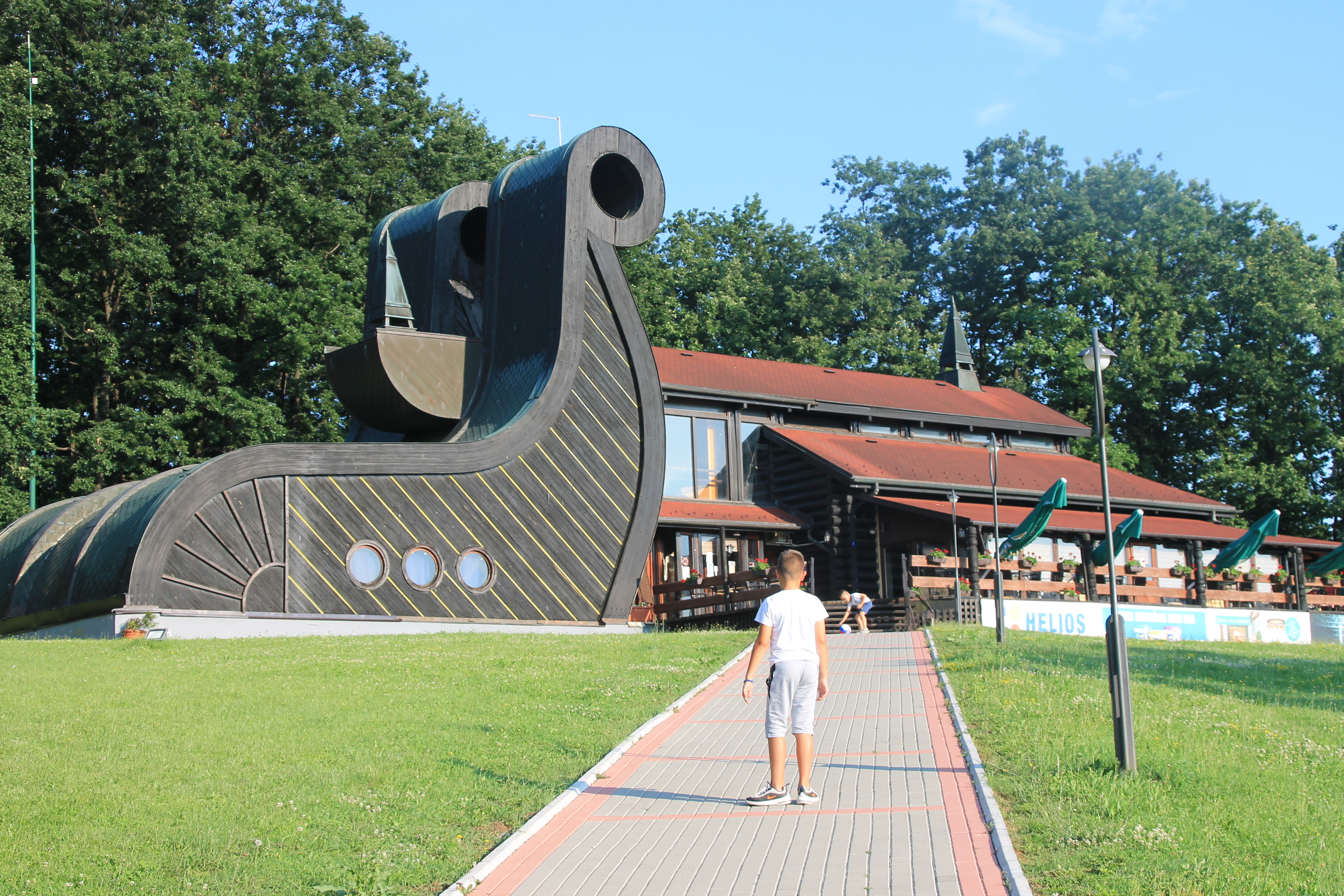
Norwegian House in Gornji Milanovac

Whilst part of Yugoslavia, Gornji Milanovac was known as the "economic miracle" and "Beli Labud" (English: "White Swan") as the ecologically cleanest city. There is great potential for further rural and spa (Svračkovci, Brđani, Mlakovac and Savinac) tourism progress in future times. Today's Gornji Milanovac on its territory has a lot of small, categorized rural hotels, one hostel and motels. Close to Gornji Milanovac is a spa and resort "Atomska Banja" Donja Trepča. Major Hotels in this town are newly opened hotel "IG Hotel" (4 stars) and "MD Neda" (3 stars) in the settlement Rudnik. In the past, there was one of the biggest hotels "Šumadija" (3 stars) bankrupted in 2004.

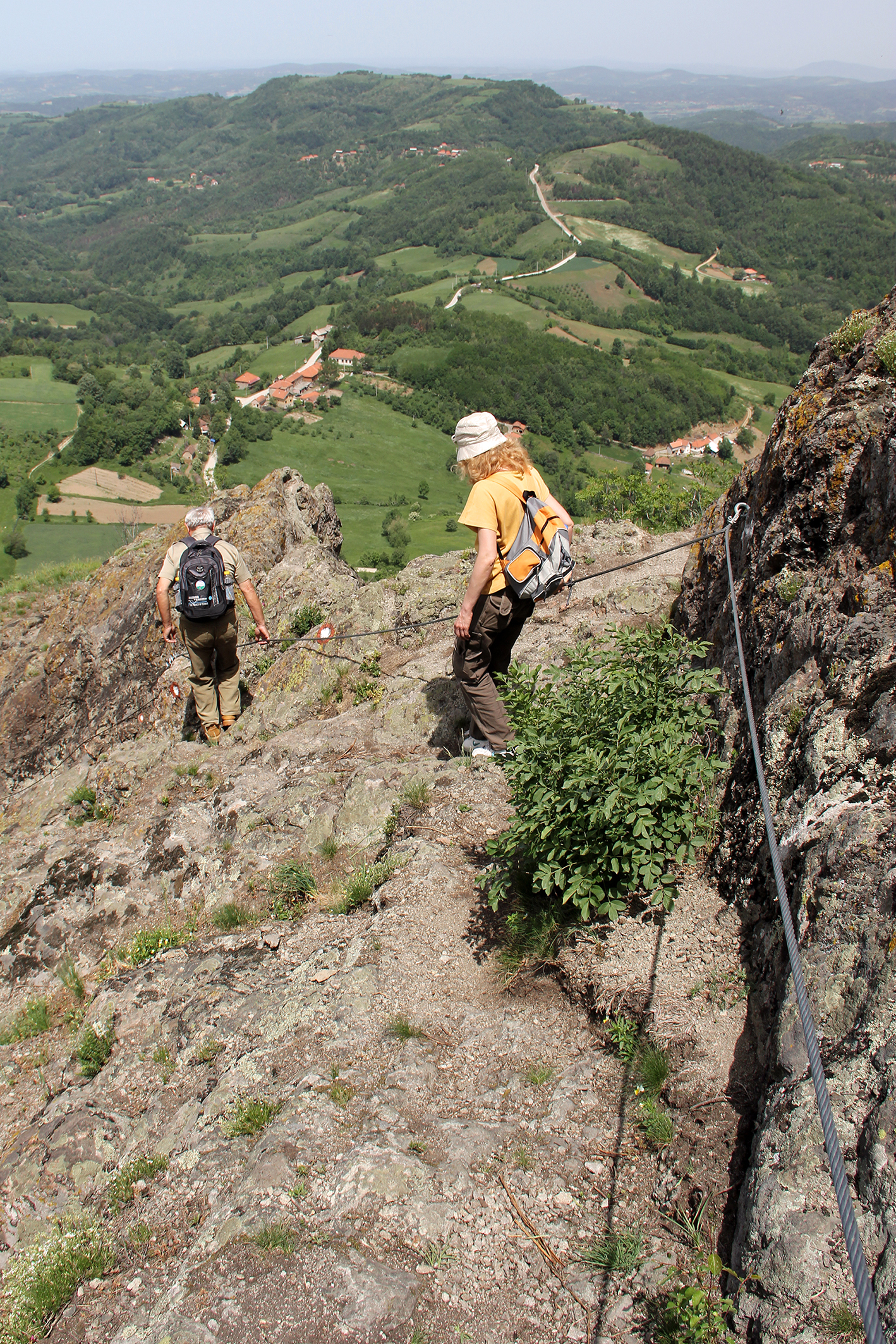
Ostrvica peak on the Rudnik mountain

Gornji Milanovac was a pioneer in the application of sorting waste, recycling and water purification in Serbia and previously in Yugoslavia. Also, Gornji Milanovac is a great antagonist of GM food why it has adopted declaration and municipality statute about prohibition of this type of food.

Tourists from around the world visit this municipality for its clean air, small and quiet places, inner and family vacations. Gornji Milanovac every other year is the host of International Biennial of miniature Art, founded in 1989. In village Takovo is the host of the World Music Festival, every May, June or July. Known trip places are: Takovo, Grabovica (peak of Ždreban), Savinac and Rudnik. These places are popular during the celebration of 1 May (International Workers' Day) as a collegial picnic in union organization. Other significant cultural and tourism events on its territory are World Testicle Cooking Championship, the "Milanovac bowl tournament" (Fish soup cooking) and the Goulash tournament ("Gulašijada"). In some settlements are held various art colonies. Also, there are held and village gymnastic competition in some disciplines during the celebration of some patron day of that village.

Gornji Milanovac has a reputation for offering a "vibrant nightlife" which is more developed and safer than in the rest of Serbia. On 7 January ( Orthodox Christmas) Gornji Milanovas Tourist organization and its citizens (transport operators companies, local company owners, farmworkers, musician and orchestra artist, motorcycle and ATV clubs, taxi drivers, firefighters, police and military) every year organize the one-day festival, because it's believed that if they start something on that holiday they will succeed in all days in that year.

Also in Gornji Milanovac are 3 fairs per year, on 22 May, 2 August and 15 October. After 70 years Gornji Milanovac as municipality celebrates its Patron day. It is Trinity, where on that day is being held pageant. Locals are advocating to build a mini cable car system for Rudnik and biathlon stadium on the Ravna Gora, given that project had failed during the 90's economical and international political problems of Yugoslavia and Serbia as a federal republic.

== Geography and infrastructure ==
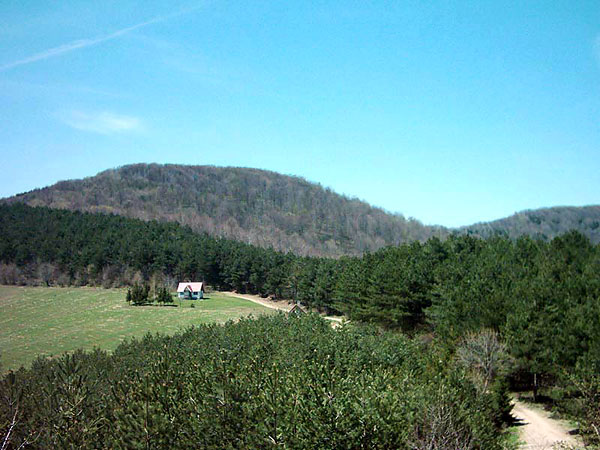
Rudnik mountain

Gornji Milanovac lies between mountains Rudnik to the north and Vujan to the south. Relief of this area is hilly and mountainous. Gornji Milanovac with all his territory is located between these mountains: Rudnik (1,132 m or 3,714 ft), Maljen (970 m or 3,180 ft), Jesevac (902 m or 2,959 ft), Suvobor (866 m or 2,841 ft), Rajac (848 m or 2,782 ft) and Vujan (845 m or 2,772 ft). Gornji Milanovac boundaries with: Ljig (on the North) and Mionica (on North-West), Topola and Aranđelovac (both on the North-East) Čačak (on the South) and Lučani (on the South West), Požega, Serbia (on the West), Kragujevac (on the East) and Knić (on theSouth-East).

The center of the city is situated along the western side of European route E763 (motorway), between the cities Ljig to the north and Čačak to the south and the villages Majdan to the north and Preljina to the south.

Main city crossroad branches:

- To the North, onto road Gornji Milanovac-Kragujevac (see Kragujevac) that crosses with E763 and turns East; the nearest village on the road is Donja Vrbava.
- To the East, turns South then East through the city, crosses E763 and then goes south through the village of Donja Trepča onto the route 23.
- To the South, towards E763.
- To the West, quickly turns North and after 5 kilometres (3.1 miles) branches into road Gornji Milanovac-Čestobrodica (see Čestobrodica) to the West; the nearest village on the road is Takovo, where Takovo Uprising begun; and into Road Gornji Milanovac – Donji Banjani (see Gornji Banjani) to the North; the nearest village on the road is Kalimanići;
- South of Milanovac, villages Brdjani to the West and Prislonica to the East are connected to E763 with local roads

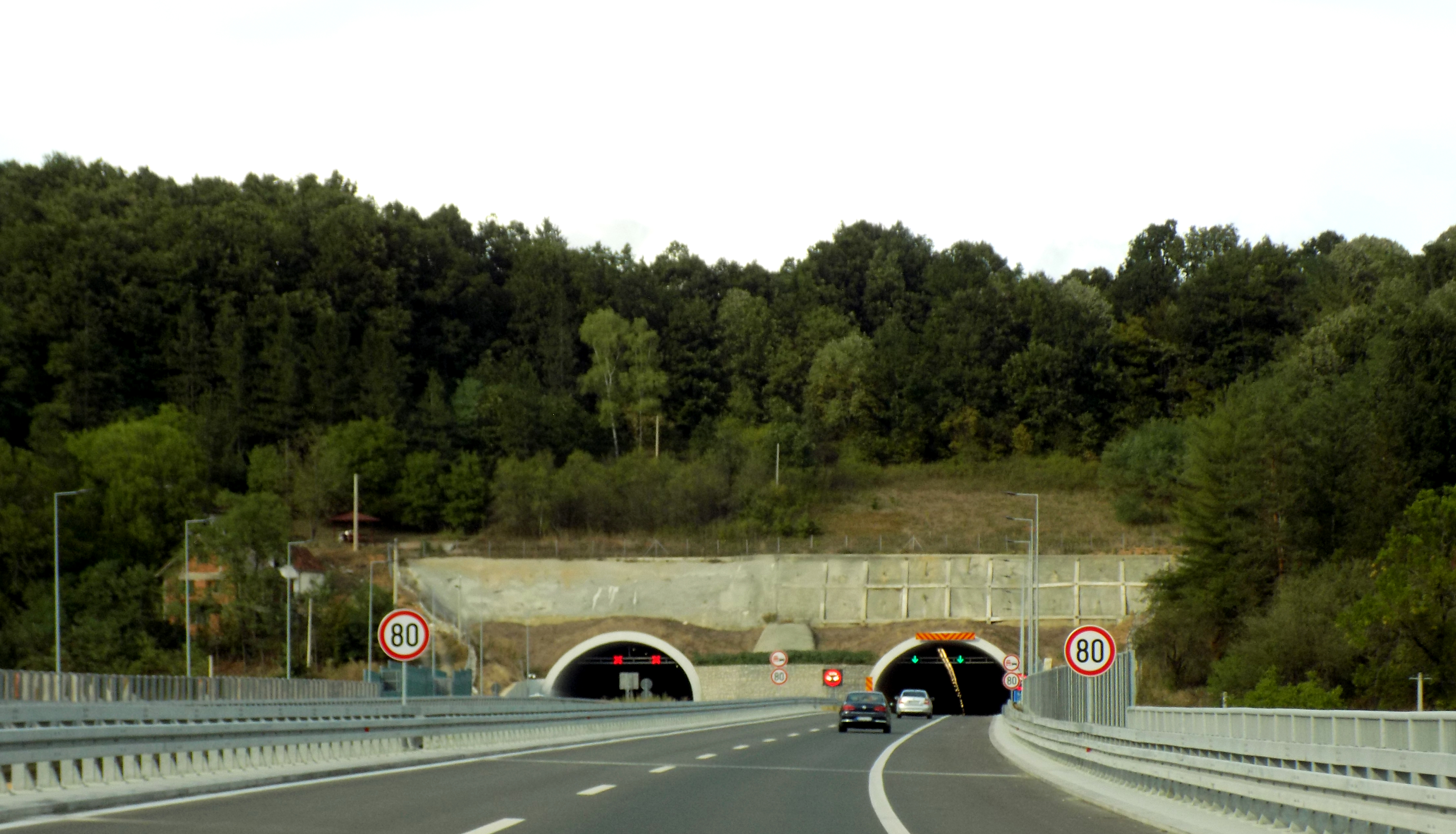
Motorway A2 in Savinac

- On the West and Southside of municipalities is situated A2 highway (Corridor XI), opened for traffic in 2016; this is the most primary project on the field of transport and tourism in the future, providing Gornji Milanovac good connection to the coast of Adriatic Sea and Belgrade.

Rivers that flow through Gornji Milanovac are: Despotovica, Gruza, Dičina, Čemernica, and Kamenica. There is a variety of groundwater sources and thermo-mineral water sources like in village areas, like in: Svrackovci, Brdjani, Mlakovac, Trepca, and Savinac.

Gornji Milanovac is instructed to use civil and military airport in nearby Morava Airport-Lajdevci, Kraljevo 36 km (22 mi), Belgrade Nikola Tesla Airport 134 km (83 mi) and Užice-Ponikve Airport 98.6 km (61 mi). Also, in September 2018, Swisslion-Takovo Concern established Heliport for business and civilian purpose. Gornji Milanovac does not have conditions for development of water traffic transportation. In 1969 narrow and regional railway Čačak-Gornji Milanovac – Topola was abolished because it was unprofitable. In 2014, Government of Serbia will consider the spatial plan of new electrified railways line Belgrade–Sarajevo, where Gornji Milanovac could be one of regional centers.

== Climate ==
Gornji Milanovac has Humid continental climate. Mildest parts (Sub-Humid) of Gornji Milanovac are Brdjani, Trudelj and Dragolj. The coldest parts (humid) are peaks of Rudnik, Rajac, parts of villages Majdan, Svrackovci, Gojna Gora, Gornji Branetici, Brajic, Polom and in the north-west part of village Bogdanica. Moderately humid parts of the municipality are in parts of Majdan and the rest parts of mountain Rudnik, Rajac, and peaks of Suvobor.

The average annual temperature of air are in range of 8 °C (46 °F) in the parts of Rudnik and Suvobor and 11 °C (52 °F) at 250 metres (820 feet). Average daily (in %) humidity 78.5% during the year, in winter 85%, in summer periods 75% (excluding Rudnik mountain where it is 65%, which is good for relaxation and vacation). The hottest month of the year is July, and the coldest is January. Autumn is warmer than the spring for 1 °C (34 °F).

The average annual precipitation height are in the range of 788–985 mm (31.0–38.8 in). Minimum mean wind speed is 1.7–2.6 m/s (3.11–5.05 knots) and maximum 13.8–20.7 m/s (26.83–40.24 knots). This maximum speed occurs in the southeastern, southwestern and southern winds. On the territory of Gornji Milanovac prevails southeastern, northern and eastern winds.

Vegetation period lasts 220–260 days. During these period precipitation rate is 55% which is favorable for plants.

According to the last measuring of Air quality in 2019, the result was satisfying, because they showed an average of 35 US AQI to moderate quality 70 US AQI in the winter periods.

Annual average daily global sun radiation energy on a horizontal surface on territory of municipality Gornji Milanovac is between 3.8–4.0 kWh/m^{2} (0.33–0.35 BTU/ft ^{2}). Daily mean values of the ambient dose rate ( background radiation) on the area around this municipality are ≈ 100 nSv/h.

Climate data for Gornji Milanovac (measuring station-Rudnik)
Month	Jan	Feb	Mar	Apr	May	Jun	Jul	Aug	Sep	Oct	Nov	Dec	Year
Record high °C	20.7	23.9	28.8	32.2	34.9	37.4	43.6	40.0	37.5	30.7	28.4	22.6	43.6
Mean daily maximum °C	4.6	7.0	12.4	18.0	23.5	26.2	28.6	28.7	23.9	18.4	11.2	5.8	17.4
Daily mean °C	−1.7	−6.2	6.3	10.3	13.0	20.1	22.3	22.1	17.9	12.2	8.0	0.6	10.4
Mean daily minimum °C	−4.4	−9.4	2.1	6.1	9.4	15.5	17.8	17.4	13.2	8.0	4.9	−3.2	6.5
Record low °C	−29.4	−15.4	−12.8	−4.9	3.5	5.5	8.4	6.7	4.7	−4.5	−7.8	−13.4	−5.7
Average precipitation mm	137.0	136.3	16.3	82.9	152.9	54.9	19.0	0.3	21.0	52.0	29.2	101.0	802.8
Record high °F	69.3	75.0	83.8	90.0	94.8	99.3	110.5	104.0	99.5	87.3	83.1	72.7	110.5
Mean daily maximum °F	40.3	44.6	54.3	64.4	74.3	79.2	83.5	83.7	75.0	65.1	52.2	42.4	63.3
Daily mean °F	28.9	20.8	43.3	50.5	55.4	68.2	72.1	71.8	64.2	54.0	46.4	33.1	50.7
Mean daily minimum °F	24.1	15.1	35.8	43.0	48.9	59.9	64.0	63.3	55.8	46.4	40.8	26.2	43.7
Record low °F	−20.9	4.3	9.0	23.2	38.3	41.9	47.1	44.1	40.5	23.9	18.0	7.9	21.7
Average precipitation inches	5.39	5.37	0.64	3.26	6.02	2.16	0.75	0.01	0.83	2.05	1.15	3.98	31.61
Average precipitation days (≥ mm)	20	16	30	8	13	10	9	10	12	14	14	12	171
Average relative humidity (%)	90	86	77	79	82	69	70	65	75	80	85	88	79
Mean monthly sunshine hours	72.2	101.7	153.2	188.1	242.2	260.9	290.8	274.0	204.3	163.1	97.0	64.5	2,112

== Geology and vegetation ==
On the territory of Gornji Milanovac there is represented the following type of soil:

- Brown acid soil-which is widespread in areas like Rudnik, from the west of Gruza river to Boljkovci;
- Brown earth on serpentine-at Vujan, Suvobor and Maljen mountains;
- Cambisol-in region of Lipovac, Prnjavor, Donja Crnuca, Belo Polje;
- Brown earth on limestone- in area of Ravna Gora;
- Brown earth on diabase-in region of Belo Polje, Gornja Vrbava, Donja Vrbava, Grabovica, Jablanica, in some village area like Brezovica, Rudnik, Zagradje, Gornji Branetici, Donji Branetici, and Ozrem.

According to Serbian Geology Institute, on Gornji Milanovac territory has solid reserves of Antimony, Mercury, Copper, Lead, Zinc and Gold (in small amounts).

Gornji Milanovac and the villages of Varnice, Zagradje, Dragolj and Trudelj are dominated by the Ostrvica Massif. The elevation of Ostrvica is 758 metres (2,487 ft). Ostrvica is actually the remains of a destroyed volcanic cone. In May 2009, Ostrvica was declared a natural monument. In the middle of the last century, this massif was significant for its military fortifications and watchtower.

Land that is not cultivated makes 14.6%, arable land 47%, barren land makes 4.4%. The erosion process was active in the past, which is why today some parts of the territory have barren land. These processes have caused the degradation of the land. According to the Republic Seismological Institution of Serbia, Gornji Milanovac is on the scale 8°-8.9° magnitude of an earthquake and the probability that this can happen once in 50–1000 years is 63%. In the major territory there is good protection from erosion process and solid protection from floods. The population doesn't have good protection from wind storms and radiation, but new standards in house and building construction stipulates even that. Most of the population has good thermal insulation in their homes and companies.

Forest vegetation is various: willow, poplar, oak, ash, etc. Forest plantations make 10% of his territory and 90% are natural wood. Meadow grass vegetation occupies 26,656 hectares (11,960 ft^{2}) which is 32%, meadows 15% and grasslands 17%.

== Terrain ==
The terrain of Gornji Milanovac is highland. Total terrain is divided by rivers Kamenica, Čemernica, Gruža, and Despotovica. It is of volcanic origin. Today the terrain is a result of the combined effects of tectonic movements and fluvial erosion processes in the past.

Morphological traits of municipalities, we can distinguish two different zones:

1. Mountain rims of the south piedmonts on Maljen, Suvobor and south-western on Rudnik,
2. Central-valley basin is characteristic of north-western parts and north of Ješevac and Vujan.

Dominant position in the municipality and Šumadija have mountain Rudnik. As the specific shape of terrain have Ostrvica which has a conical shape and it is positioned north-western from mountain and settlement Rudnik. Mountain massif Ješevac is positioned on the east side of the municipality. Mountain Vujan is lying southwards from river Despotovica to Brdjani pit. Western parts of the area covers Rajac, Suvobor and Maljen. Westernmost parts include Pranjani pit.

== Demographics ==
Historical population
Year	Pop.	±% p.a.
1948	49,604	—
1953	49,859	+0.10%
1961	47,894	−0.50%
1971	48,420	+0.11%
1981	50,651	+0.45%
1991	50,087	−0.11%
2002	47,641	−0.45%
2011	44,406	−0.78%

According to the 2011 census, the municipality of Gornji Milanovac had 44,406 inhabitants, 21,802 males (average age 42.4 years), 22,604 females (43.7 years). The overwhelming majority were ethnic Serbs (97.85%), Serbian Orthodox Christian by religion, and Serbian-speaking. Population density on the territory of the municipality is 53.1 inhabitants per square kilometer. Since the census of 1981 when the total population was 50,651 people, there is a population decline due to the bad economic conditions in Serbia, negative natural increase rate and the majority of the older population. As of 2011, in Gornji Milanovac there are 637 migrants.

== Economy and industry ==
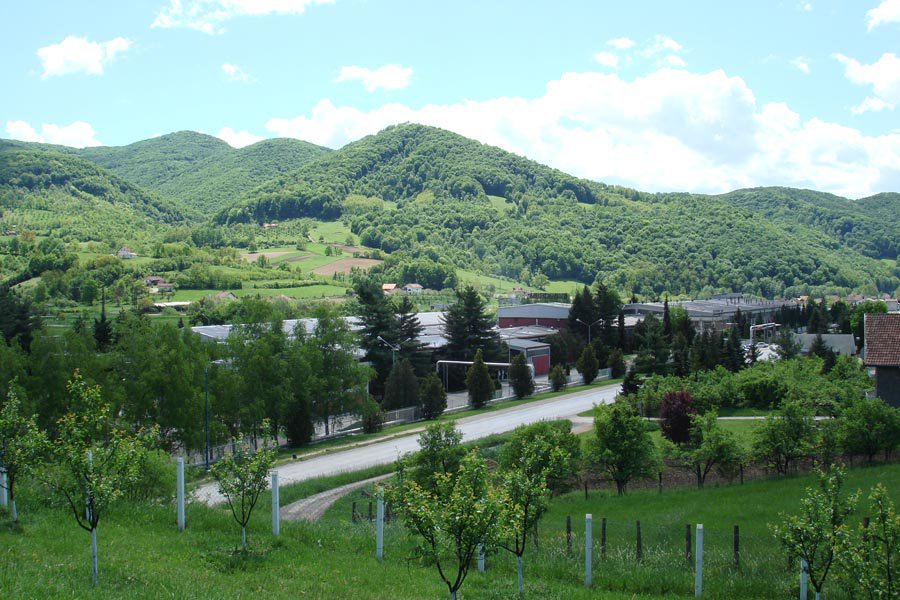
The South industrial zone

1890 was significant as journalism began in this area. After World War I, Gornji Milanovac was connected with other important areas and cities in Yugoslavia thanks to the narrow gauge railway. Before World War II the population was involved in mining, agronomy and with a few industrial workers (conditory and graphic-printing industry). During World War II the town was destroyed, but in the 1950s it saw a rapid progress dubbed "economic miracle".

In that time there were established two industrial zones (in the South and South-West parts). Companies and corporations that were established in these zones were: Zvezda (now known as Zvezda-Helios), Metalac, PIK Takovo (now known as Swisslion-Takovo), MK Rudnik (Fashion Stationery), FAD (automotive parts for all European cars), Tipoplastika (plastics, paper production), Metal Seko (now known as Mersteel), GRO Graditelj (construction company), Minos (railway equipment), Rudnik Flotation (mining production), Dečje novine (popular youth newspaper and publisher in SFR Yugoslavia), Proleter (department store), Kablar (cooperative agronomy company), Sigma (cardboard producer), Šipad Sarajevo-Gornji Milanovac (construction carpentry), Imlek (dairy products; subsidiary), Mlinsko-Pekarska Industrija Beograd (food industry; subsidiary), JTv Gornji Milanovac (local broadcasting company), KDS "Despotovica" (cable TV distribution systems).

Gornji Milanovac in the '80s and '90s was a real "nursery" of a mixed economy. Despite the 90's break up of SFR Yugoslavia and UN sanctions, Gornji Milanovac was the only city in that time in newly formed FR Yugoslavia whose companies were operated with a profit. New date companies are: "9. September", "Tetra Pak", "Papir Print", "Spektar", "Flint Group Balkan", "Planeta računari", "FOKA", "S-group", "Semix Techno", "Interplet Gradnja", "Rapid", "AzVirt", "Rolopast", "RM Pak", "RGM Pak", "Apex", "MetalMont","Kej komerc", "Neven","Agrouniverzal", DAM 93", "RP Štamparija", "PCM Graf", "CIS Ecopoint", "Maksimil", "Jomla Group","Digitel", "Alfa Support", etc.

After 2001 and 2002, most "workers organizations" (name for state- or worker-owned companies) from the period of 1950–1990 (mentioned above) were privatized. Only a few bankrupted: GRO Graditelj, Mlinsko-Pekarska Industrija Beograd (subsidiary), Imlek (subsidiary), Dečje novine, Minos and JTv Gornji Milanovac.

Here department stores, two mini-supermarkets, elegant boutiques, and restaurants can be found. Also, there is a flea markets, where local farmers are selling vegetables, products, and a market of farm animals.

Today Gornji Milanovac valid for the biggest exporter of goods, services and products in the Republic of Serbia and one of the few cities and municipalities with the budget surplus. During the period of June 2014 unemployment rate in Gornji Milanovac was 25.28%. Most of municipality economy relies on 329 Small business, 22 Medium size business and 9 Big business.

Human Poverty Index (HPI) in Gornji Milanovac, according to the 2011 Census of the Republic of Serbia and World Bank is 24.00%, while GINI ratio is 0.336 and Poverty gap index is 0.039.

Economic preview

The following table gives a preview of total number of registered people employed in legal entities per their core activity (as of 2022):

Activity	Total
Agriculture, forestry and fishing	101
Mining and quarrying	543
Manufacturing	5,043
Electricity, gas, steam and air conditioning supply	56
Water supply; sewerage, waste management and remediation activities	165
Construction	450
Wholesale and retail trade, repair of motor vehicles and motorcycles	1,606
Transportation and storage	435
Accommodation and food services	403
Information and communication	108
Financial and insurance activities	220
Real estate activities	10
Professional, scientific and technical activities	441
Administrative and support service activities	256
Public administration and defense; compulsory social security	372
Education	782
Human health and social work activities	881
Arts, entertainment and recreation	161
Other service activities	188
Individual agricultural workers	389
Total	12,612

== Community services and Territorial organizations ==
=== Education ===
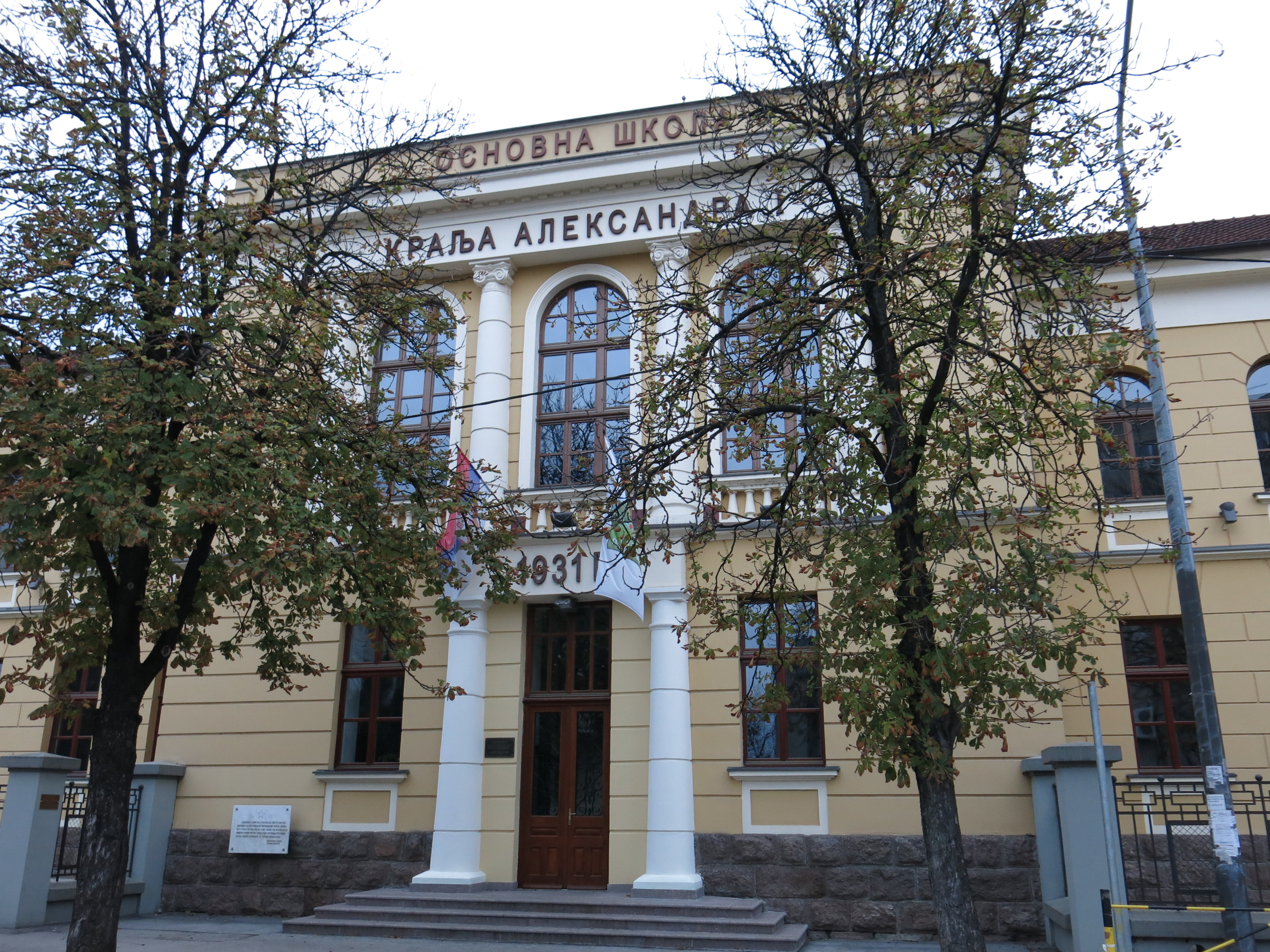
King Alexander I primary school

Gornji Milanovac has four primary schools: OŠ "Sveti Sava", OŠ Desanka Maksimović, OŠ "Kralj Aleksandar I" (before "Takovski-Partizanski bataljon") and OŠ "Momčilo Nastasijević". Also it has one high school: Gimnazija "Takovski ustanak. Two professional schools (four or three-year): ETŠ "Knjaz Miloš" and TŠ "Jovan Žujović". As regard as kindergarten and nurseries in this municipality there is three of these.

Gornji Milanovac had one department for higher education from Novi Sad, which was private owned and this department dissolved. In future periods was planned to open new departments of University of Kragujevac Faculty of Economics for business administration, taxes and accounting. Also and Faculty of Architecture University of Belgrade had negotiations about opening new departments for local students.

=== Health protection ===
Health protection in Gornji Milanovac is widespread on all territory. Citizens can reach basic health protection even in rural parts of municipality. Health care is organized like: General Hospital, Neurology Hospital, Gynaecology department, Intensive care unit, Labour health protection unit (there are departmans and units in two industrial zones), Surgical and physiatrically department, Dentistry, Dermatology, Psychiatric ward, Rehabilitation services, Village Health Protection Units and Physical therapy. Common support units include a dispensary, pathology, and radiology, and on the non-medical side, there are medical records departments, release of information departments, financial and HR department, Patient lawyers, Clinical Engineering, Facilities Management, Dining Services and Security Departments. There is an emergency service in place. On the property of Gornji Milanovac Hospital, there is built infrastructure for mini spa and rehabilitation center for skin and musculoskeletal diseases from water resources, mentioned above (see section Geography and Infrastructure). As for health protection of animals, Gornji Milanovac has several privately owned veterinary stations.

=== Media broadcasting ===
"Dečje novine" was the largest publishing house of books, comics, magazines and sticker albums in former Yugoslavia, based in this municipality. They had exclusive copyrights to publish comics of Walt Disney, Marvel and DC Comics. This publisher bankrupted in the 90's and then the remains of company assets were divided among creditors. Creditors established new companies in the sector of publishing books, newspapers, design and art, graphical services and enigmatic-revival editions. But these independent companies did not have the same success as "Dečje novine" had.

This town had 3 private owned radio stations and 1 local broadcasting station. In the '80s at Gornji Milanovac was established experimental radio station for travelers highway information services and among the first cable television systems in Yugoslavia, called Cable Distributive Systems "Despotovica". Due to the technological advancements, this radio station was called off during 1990. At the time of NATO bombing of Yugoslavia (during 1999), former JTv Gornji Milanovac broadcast television and radio signal to the world (because Radio Television of Serbia was bombed and destroyed on 23 April 1999.) for the short time until NATO air force bombed radio and television repeater at mountain Rudnik and nearby Kablar. Now Gornji Milanovac has 2 radio stations, "Gogi" and "Stari Milanovac" radio local broadcasting company, which both broadcasts folk music, information, and news in the Serbian language. Meanwhile, the radio station "Stari Milanovac" bankrupted.

Until 2014, Gornji Milanovac did not have television broadcasting, after series of unsuccessful privatization of former JTv Gornji Milanovac. Now, this municipality has regional television and cable television broadcasting company "Telemark Systems". Telemark bought old cable television KDS Despotovica. This television company provides: cable television, regional television broadcasting for several municipalities ( besides Gornji Milanovac there are providing in Čačak, Lučani, Arilje, Požega, Kosjerić and Kraljevo), broadband internet, IT services, advertising services, fixed telephony, MMDS, dealership of digital and cable TV equipment and other services. Also, Gornji Milanovac has newspaper company "Takovske Novine", while "GM Press" bankrupted. In 2019, Telekom Srbija bought Telemark Systems and municipality Gornji Milanovac wanted new business partners for joint ventures in the media area. In August 2019, license for television media coverage is given to newly formed RTV GM Info Group.

=== Territorial organisation ===
There is one police station, Ministry of Internal Affairs of Serbia administration unit, Military post, Post office, branch of FedEx for Serbia, Customs substation and Fire-Rescuers department. The settlements are organized as Council of Settlements and Gornji Milanovac is divided into 63 settlements. Each of them has responsibility (infrastructure, election/referendum, and legal obligations) for that part of the territory.

== Settlements ==
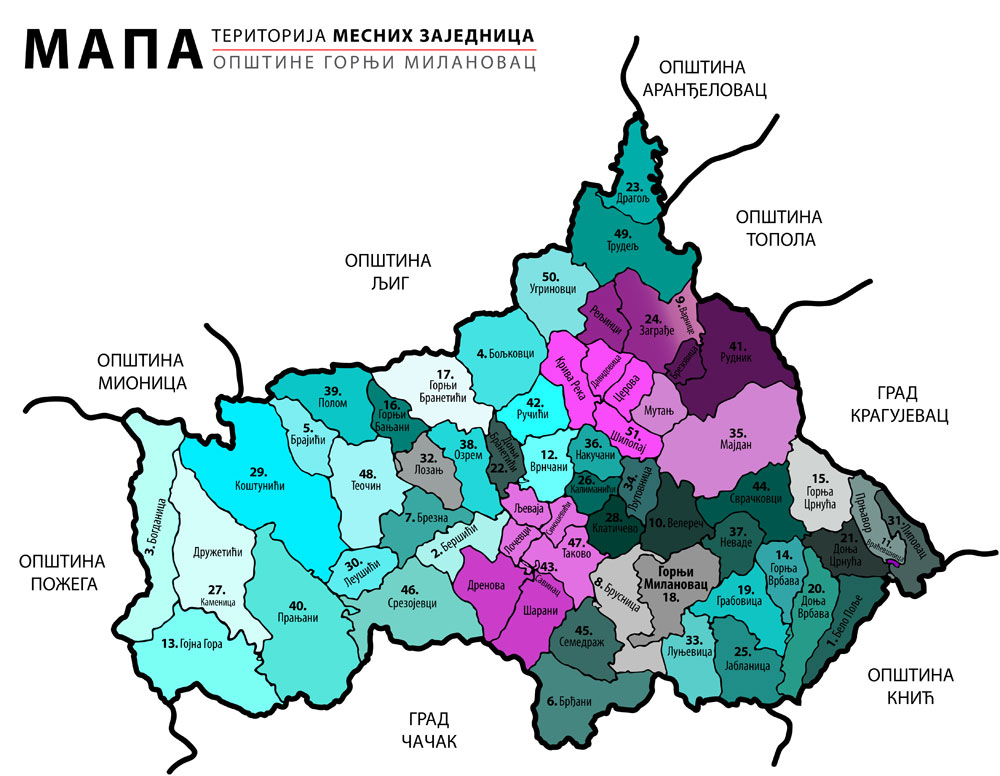
Map of the settlements in Gornji Milanovac and their territory organisation.

Aside from the town of Gornji Milanovac, the municipality of Gornji Milanovac includes the following 60 settlements and 3 smaller towns :

- Belo Polje
- Beršići
- Bogdanica
- Boljkovci
- Brajići
- Brdjani
- Brezna
- Brezovica
- Brusnica
- Varnice
- Velereč
- Vraćevšnica
- Vrnčani
- Gojna Gora
- Gornja Vrbava
- Gornja Crnuća
- Gornji Banjani
- Gornji Branetići
- Grabovica
- Davidovica
- Donja Vrbava
- Donja Crnuća
- Donji Branetići
- Dragolj
- Drenova
- Družetići
- Zagradje
- Jablanica
- Kalimanići
- Kamenica
- Klatičevo
- Koštunići
- Kriva Reka
- Leušići
- Lipovac
- Lozanj
- Ločevci
- Lunjevica
- Ljevaja
- Ljutovnica
- Majdan
- Mutanj
- Nakucani
- Nevade
- Ozrem
- Polom
- Pranjani
- Prnjavor
- Reljinci
- Rudnik
- Ručići
- Svračkovci
- Semedraž
- Sinoševići
- Srezojevci
- Takovo
- Teočin
- Trudelj
- Ugrinovci
- Cerova
- Šarani
- Šilopaj

== Judicial system and safety ==
Gornji Milanovac from its establishment had modern district court. Today it has Basic People Court and Magistrates Court. Also, it is among the safest municipalities in Serbia. According to National Statistical Institute of Serbia in 2013 Gornji Milanovac had 148 convicted adults and 16 juvenile. Safety index of this municipality is among the highest than in other municipalities in Serbia 98.63%.

== Politics ==
According to the Law on Local Self-Government head of municipality (for this status they need population 10,000–99,000 citizens) is called "president" and for larger cities (100,000 and above population), they are called "mayors". Gornji Milanovac has/had 29 presidents in his history. In the following table are named presidents and not precise dates of their mandate:

Presidents of Municipalities	Political Party	Mandat period
Jovan Andrić	People's Radical Party	End 19th century
Maksim Sretenović	People's Radical Party	End 19th century
Stanoje Marinković	People's Radical Party	Beginning of the 20th century
Dragoljub Skubic	Yugoslav National Party, Yugoslav Radical Union	1930s
Svetozar Čivović	Yugoslav Radical Union	1941–1945
Branko Knežević	League of Communists of Yugoslavia	1944–1945
Lazar Djordjević	League of Communists of Yugoslavia	1945–1947
Zdravko Radojević	League of Communists of Yugoslavia	1947
Uroš Ivanović	League of Communists of Yugoslavia	1947
Branko Petrović	League of Communists of Yugoslavia	1947
Mihailo Mile Tešić	League of Communists of Yugoslavia	1947–1950
Milovan Milovanović	League of Communists of Yugoslavia	1950–1951
Hristivoje Popović	League of Communists of Yugoslavia	1951– 1955
Djordje Djoka Cajić	League of Communists of Yugoslavia	1955–1960
Milojko Veljović	League of Communists of Yugoslavia	1960–1963
Borivoje Novaković	League of Communists of Yugoslavia	1963–1965
Slobodan Stanojević	League of Communists of Yugoslavia	1965–1967
Dragoljub Dragan Pavlović	League of Communists of Yugoslavia	1967–1969
Živojin Simović	League of Communists of Yugoslavia	1969–1974
Stanimir Jovanović	League of Communists of Yugoslavia	1974–1978; 1978–1982
Dušan M. Papić	League of Communists of Yugoslavia	1982–1984
Jovan Tomović	League of Communists of Yugoslavia	1984–1986
Todor Popović	League of Communists of Yugoslavia	1986–1988
Pantelija Gačić	League of Communists of Yugoslavia	1989–1992
Dražimir Marušić	Socialist Party of Serbia	1992–1993; 1993–1997; 1997–2000
Aleksandar Pravdić	Democratic Party of Serbia	2000–2001
Milutin M. Prodanović	Democratic Party of Serbia	2001–2004
Vladimir Simović	Democratic Party of Serbia	2004
Dražimir Marušić	Socialist Party of Serbia	2004–2008; 2008–2010 (died in office)
Milisav Mirković	Socialist Party of Serbia	2010–2012; 2012–2016
Dejan Kovačević	Serbian Progressive Party	2016–present

== Flag, Motto, and Coat of Arms ==
First adopted representative solution for Gornji Milanovac was at the beginning of the '60s, with gray flag and complex emblem which consist of green and white colors. Symbols and colors are :

- Green and white was supposed to represent a clean environment with butterfly in the center of emblem,
- In the circle was put Serbian Cyrillic letter "Г (G)", which stands for first initial for "Gornji" and outside is also Serbian Cyrillic letter "M" which stands for the second initial of "Milanovac",
- Gear wheel with number 1853 (which symbolized year of foundation) at the bottom, which supposed to symbolized economical-financial and overall progress of Gornji Milanovac and his people:

The second adopted solution was adopted after the 2000s. This Coat of Arms and Flag was a political and heraldic problem between Socialists Party of Serbia on one side and other political organizations in this municipality on the other side. It was adopted three times: 2000–2004 (municipality government led by DOS), last quarter of 2004–2008 (municipality government led by DSS, SRS, NS, SPO, G17+, DS, LDP) and 2016–present (municipality government led by SNS, NS, PUPS, PS, SDPS and ZS). This coat of arms consists of two lions (red who is holding Serbian civil flag and yellow who is holding the flag of the municipality) with crowns and swords which represented royalty through history and courage of the citizens. In the center of the coat of arms it is positioned heater shield with golden oak and red cross in the middle of the shield. The purpose of these two symbols is to represent ancestors on this lands and red cross to represent rebellion flag from the Second Serbian Uprising and " Zapis" or literally inscription who were there in the moment of gathering all rebellions in that time. Above the heater shield is a stone crown which represents forts and the city history. The flag is a blue background with a wreath of willow flowers and nettle leaves which symbolizes Palm Sunday (on that holiday, 24 April 1815, Serbian rebels gathered and begin the Second Serbian Uprising) and Serbian custom of knitting wreaths for health, luck and love purpose. In the center of the flag is a white background with red Greek Orthodox Cross which symbolizes above mentioned Second Serbian Uprising flag. The motto is positioned on the bottom of this coat of arms: "Време и моје право (Time and my right)".

The third adopted solution is now replaced emblem and flag of Gornji Milanovac. It is also and the flag of a political coalition called "Pokret za opštinu Gornji Milanovac-POGM (Movement for Municipality of Gornji Milanovac)". The flag is white with some form of inverted Iberian shield. In the shield there are territorial map of municipality as treetop (positioned with blue background which represents sky), in the middle is oak stump which also symbolizes Zapis and Second Serbian Uprising (positioned with green background which represents grass and clean environment) and on the bottom of this emblem, there is inscription "Општина Горњи Милановац (Municipality of Gornji Milanovac)" (positioned in brown background, which represent fertile soil. First flag version of the municipality, in the period of 2004–2008 was a horizontally oriented flag with red, blue and gold colors. In the center of this first solution flag was wreath and Paja Jovanović's painting of Second Serbian Uprising in the center of it. This first solution was abolished and replaced with the second version and also the flag of a political movement. First version was approved for ceremonial purpose. The motto of the municipality was:,, Усудити се, то је цена успеха (Venture is the price of success)".

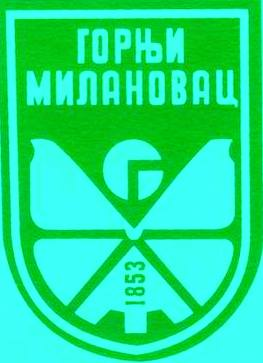
First adopted the solution of emblem for the municipality of Gornji Milanovac (1961–2000)

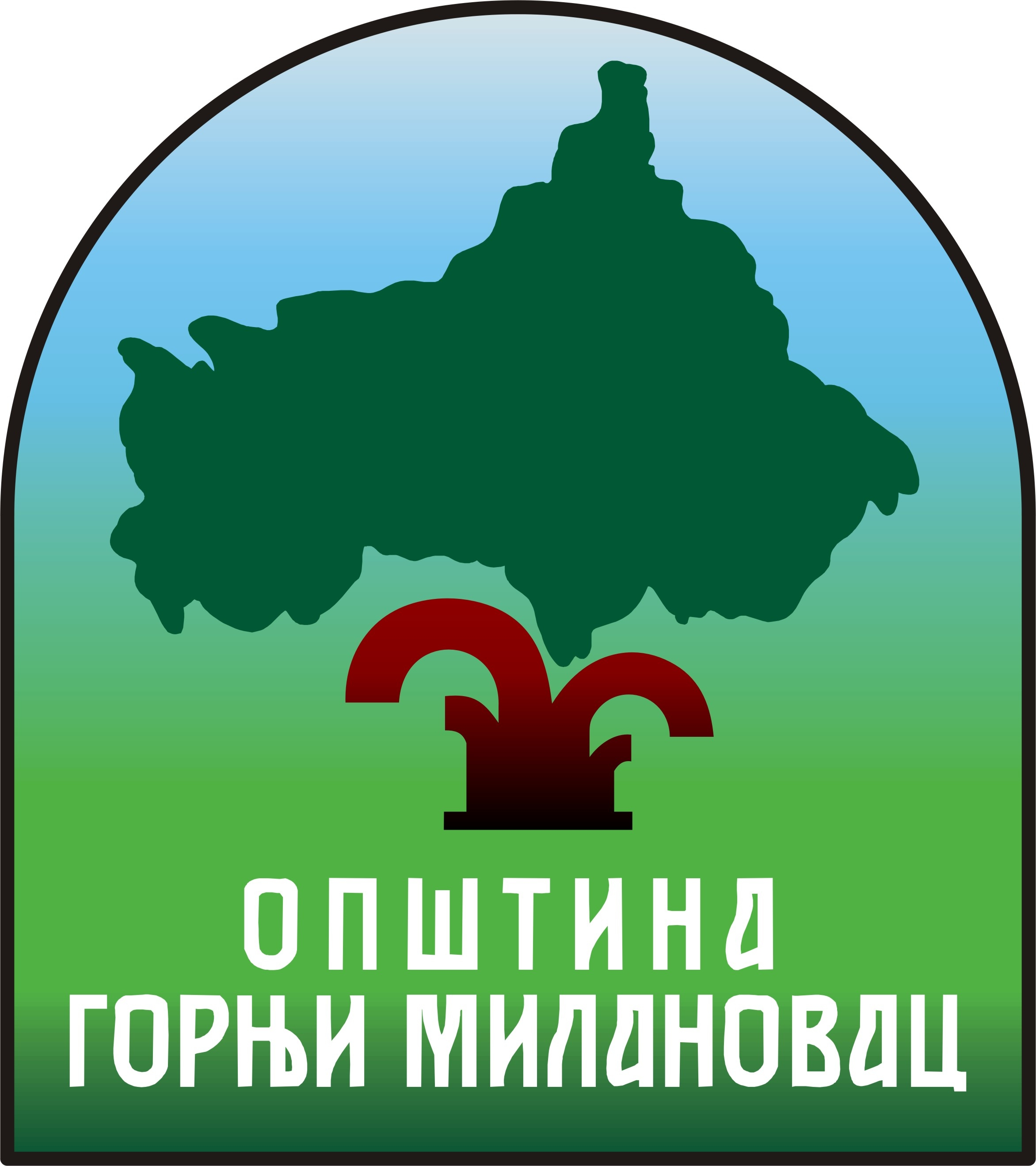
Gornji Milanovac and Movement for Municipality of Gornji Milanovac emblem and the second version of flag

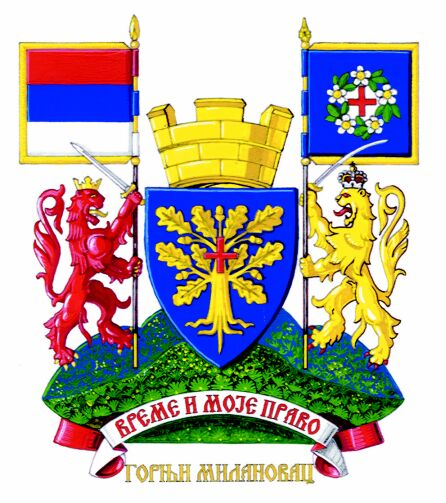
Big coat of arms of Gornji Milanovac (as of 2016)

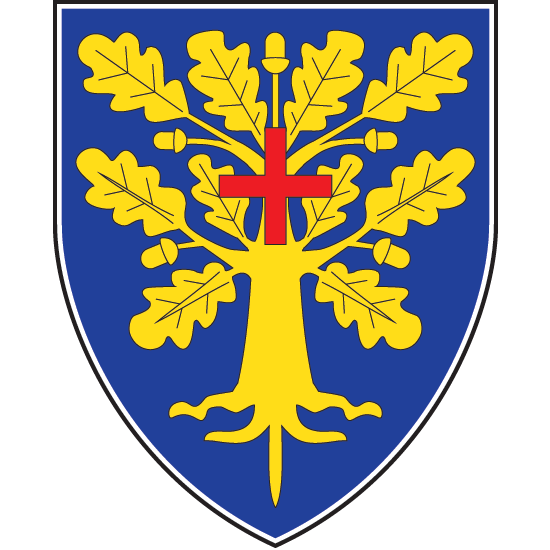
Standard coat of arms of Gornji Milanovac (as of 2016)

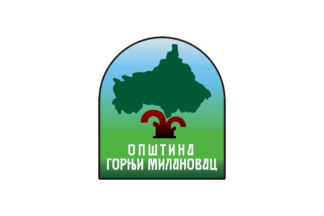
Flag of Gornji Milanovac (as of 2016)

In November 2016, new municipality authorities adopted Statute of Municipality Gornji Milanovac with previous, second solution. Problems about flag, motto and coat of arms is in political nature. Above mention political Movement of Municipality Gornji Milanovac is adopting the third solution (now previous emblem). In the 2008 opposition parties suggest referendum about Municipality Statute, but referendum never held. Litigation continues even today and remains to see the next composition of municipality authorities.

== Sport ==
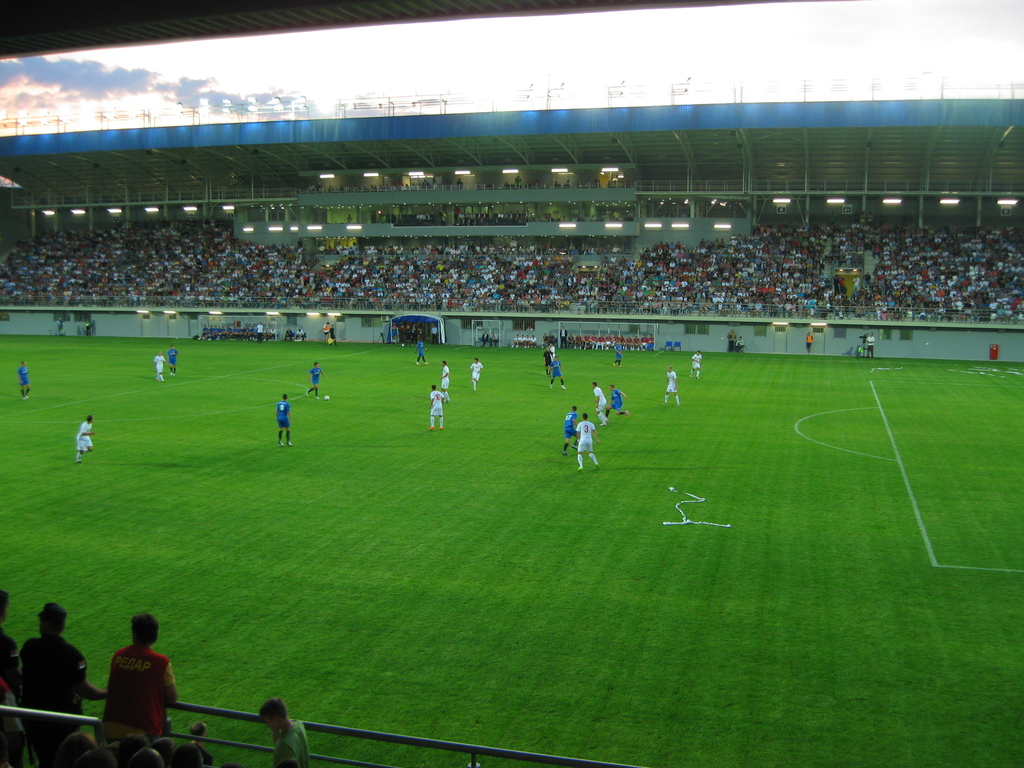
Metalac stadium

The most popular sport in the city, besides Basketball, Handball and Volleyball, is definitely football (soccer). The governing body for the sport is Sportski Savez Opštine Gornji Milanovac (engl. Sport Union of Municipality Gornji Milanovac-SSOGM). Besides New Metalac Stadium, Gornji Milanovac have: Sport Hall "Breza" (multi-purpose); Indoors Sport Swimming pool "Tipoplastika" (currently under reconstruction); Sport and recreative centers for workers, students and public in industry zones of Tipoplastika, Autoprevoz and Swisslion-Takovo companies; Outdoors Olympic pool; two sport halls in Pranjani and at Rudnik; Sport Hall in Primary schools at Gornji Milanovac; two bowling hall (one at Metalac Stadium and one in area of professional school "Jovan Žujović"); one beach soccer (football) and volleyball ground; Ice skating rink and one outdoors gym (nearby Sport Hall "Breza"); and "Takovo" Stadium (multipurpose).

Notable sport society from Gornji Milanovac are shown in following table:

Gornji Milanovac professional sports teams
Club	Sport		Venue	League	Description
FK Metalac Gornji Milanovac	Soccer (Football)	Football pictogram	Metalac Stadium	Serbian First League (2nd tier)	Men's football team. Established 1961.
FK Takovo	Soccer (Football)	Football pictogram	SD Takovo stadium	Serbian League West (3rd tier)	Men's football team. Established 1911.
OK Takovo-Zvezda-Helios (Women); Takovo-Metalac (Men)	Volleyball	Volleyball (indoor) pictogram	SC "Breza"	Serbian First League (women, 2nd tier), Serbian Super League (men, 1st tier)	Men and women's volleyball team
SD Dragan Jeftic Skepo	Shooting	Shooting pictogram	Shooting range SD Dragan Jeftić Škepo	SSS Cup	Men and women's shooting team.
ŽRK Metalac AD	Handball	Handball pictogram	SC "Breza"	Serbian First League (West) for Women	Women's handball team
RK Tipoplastika	Handball	Handball pictogram	Sport and recreation center of Tipoplastika company	None	Men's handball team. Dissolved, 2000.
RK Omladinac	Handball	Handball pictogram	SC "Breza"	Serbian First League West	Dissolved in the 1980s. Reestablished 2012
KAF Metalac	American Football	American football pictogram	Takovo Stadium	Ex Second Serbian and Montenegrin American Football National League (NLS)	Men's American football team. Dissolved.
KBK Milanovac	Kickboxing	Kickboxing pictogram	Various	Future champions league	Men's kickboxing club
KK Metalac	Bowling	Bowling pictogram	Atomsko Sklonište and at Metalac Stadium	Serbian Super League (bowling)	Men's bowling team
KMF Metalac-Kolorado	Futsal	Futsal pictogram	SC "Breza"	Second Futsal League-West	Men's futsal team
AK Takovo	Athletics	Athletics pictogram	Takovo stadium	Serbian Athletic League	Men and women's athletic team
AK Veteran	Athletics	Athletics pictogram	Takovo stadium	Serbian Athletic League	Men and women's athletic team
MK Lonely Riders	Motorcycles	Sinnbild Kraftrad	SAS Parac	AMSS championship	Men and Women motorcycle club
OKK Takovo	Basketball	Basketball pictogram	Hall of TŠ "Jovan Žujović" and SC "Breza"	Junior Regional Basketball League-West	Men's basketball team
KK Ikar Gornji Milanovac	Basketball	Basketball pictogram	SC "Breza"	None	Men and Women's basketball club for children with special needs
KK GM032	Basketball	Basketball pictogram	SC "Breza"	Second Men Regional Basketball League-West group B	Men's basketball team
KK Takovo	Karate	Karate pictogram	SC "Breza"	No data	Men and Women's karate club
TK Takovo	Tennis	Tennis pictogram	"Takovo" Stadium complex	Tennis League of Serbia	Men and women's tennis club
PK Kupidon	Darts	Darts pictogram	Various	Second national league	Men darts club
JK Grabovica	Sailing	Sailing pictogram	None	None (dissolved, 2009)	Men sailing club
DK Arasi	Judo	Judo pictogram	Various	Unknown	Men's and women judo club
BK Car Dušan Silni	Shoot wrestling	MMA Bushido pictogram	Various	Serbian Battle Championship	Men shoot wrestling affiliation
PSD Rudnik	Mountaineering	Mountaineering pictogram	Rudnik mountain complex	PSS Expeditions	Men's and women mountaineering sport association
ŠK Metalac-Takovo	Chess	Chess pictogram	Various	Serbian Super League	Men and women chess club
STSO Gornji Milanovac	Table Tennis	Table tennis pictogram	Various	Serbia Table Tennis Federation League	Men and women table tennis club
PK Domingo	Dance sport club	DanceSport pictogram	Various	Various	Men and women dance sport club

Also there are multisport activities and organizations in this municipality. Such as: DTV Partizan (physical training club for children/school children and workers) and four junior football (soccer) clubs: "Poletarac", "Junior soccer", "Srpski orlovi" and "Sportic". As far as municipality association football (soccer) league, Gornji Milanovac has 12 members: Majdan, Jablanica, Šumadija, Ozrem PMH, Šilopaj, Velereč '94, Ozremica, Mladi Rudar, Mladost '09, Takovski ustanak, Brezak, Sparta Grabovica and Omladinac. Every municipality football senior game is well covered by local residents. In Morava District league (5th level in Serbian Football league system) there are some Gornji Milanovac clubs, as: FK Napredak Svračkovci, FK Backovac United, FK Donja Vrbava and FK Lunjevica.

== Notable people ==
This municipality has numerous of deserving citizens who have contributed to the progress of Serbia and Yugoslavia.

- Hadži-Prodan Gligorijević, Serbian military commander in First Serbian Uprising
- Jovan Žujović, anthropologist, a founder of geology in Serbia
- Mija Aleksić, Serbian actor
- Momčilo Nastasijević, a Serbian poet and novelist
- Uroš Petrović, literate
- Bjesovi, alternative rock band
- Snežana Đurišić, Serbian and Yugoslavian folk singer
- Čedomir Mirković, Serbian writer and editor
- Draga Mašin, queen and wife of King Aleksandar Obrenović of the Kingdom of Serbia
- Ljubica Vukomanović, Princess consort of the Principality of Serbia, wife of Miloš Obrenović
- Jelena Abbou, née Jelena Djordjevic Fitness and figure competition
- Dragan Todorović, Serbian politician and president of political party "Istočna alternativa (East Alternative)"
- Milomir Marić, Serbian journalist, writer, and television presenter
- Bojan Dimitrijević, Serbian politician and ex-minister of Trade, Tourism, and Services in the Serbian government
- Dragiša Vasić, Serbian and Yugoslavian lawyer, writer, publicist, soldier
- Arsenije Loma, Serbian duke during the First and Second Serbian Uprising of the Serbian revolution
- Ljubica Otašević, Serbian and Yugoslavian actor and women basketball player
- Čedomir Mirković, writer and critic
- Uroš Petrović, poet
- Dobrica Matković, chief of the Royal Department for State Protection and Ban of Danube

== Sources ==
- Čeliković, Borisav, ed. (2011). Rudnički okrug, Rudnička Morava: naselja, poreklo stanovništva, običaji. Belgrade: SANU. ISBN 978-86-519-0961-3.
- Filipović, Milenko S. (1960). Таково. Научно дело.
- Marković, Života (1994). "Представници Рудничке и Пожешке (Чачанске) нахије у Правитељствујушчем совјету и скупштинама народних старешина од 1804. до 1813. године" [Représentants des nahies de Roudnik et de Pojéga (Tchatchak) au Conseil d'administration et aux assemblées des chefs du peuple entre les années 1804 et 1813]. Зборник радова Народног музеја у Чачку. XXIV: 61–82.
- Milićević, Milan Đ. (1876). Кнежевина Србија: географија, орографија, хидрографија, топографија, аркеологија, историја, етнографија, статистика, просвета, култура, управа. U državnoj štampariji.
- Pavlović, Dragoljub M. (1990). "Учесници српских үстанака од 1804. до 1815. године из Рудничке и Пожешке нахије" [Participants aux insurrections serbes de 1804 et 1815 nés dans les nahies de Rudnik et de Požega] (PDF). Зборник радова Народног музеја у Чачку. XX: 115–131.
- Peruničić, Branko (1968). Čačak i Gornji Milanovac, 1815-1865. Izdanje Istorijskog arhiva.
