= OK Takovo =

Serbian volleyball club

Takovo
- Full name: Odbojkaški klub Takovo
- Short name: OK Takovo
- Founded: 1976; 49 years ago
- Ground: Breza Sports Hall (Capacity: 1,500)
- League: Serbian Superleague (men); Serbian First League (women)
- Website: Club home page

Uniforms
Home	Away

Odbojkaški klub Takovo (Serbian Cyrillic: Одбојкашки клуб Таково) is a men's and women's professional volleyball club based in Gornji Milanovac, Serbia.

The club was founded in 1976. Men's team plays in the Serbian Superleague (1st tier), while women's team plays in the Serbian First League (2nd tier).
