= Brezovica, Gornji Milanovac =

Brezovica Брезовица
- Village
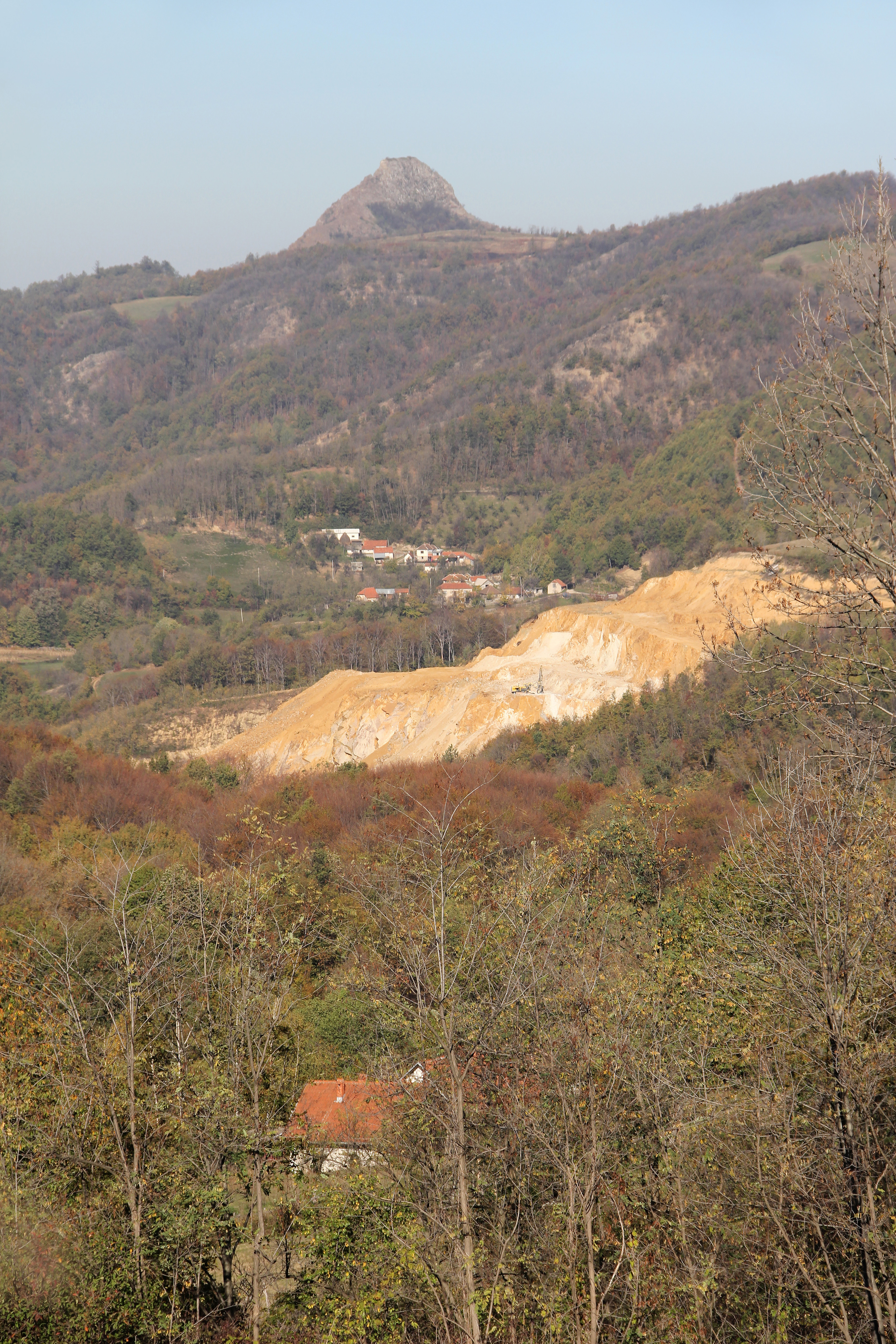
- Brezovica kod Gornjeg Milanovca

- Location within Serbia
- Coordinates: 44.4903°N 19.9585°E
- Country: Serbia
- District: Moravica District
- Municipality: Gornji Milanovac

Population (2002)
  - Total: 126
- Time zone: UTC+1 (CET)
  - Summer (DST): UTC+2 (CEST)

Brezovica is a village in the municipality of Gornji Milanovac, Serbia. According to the 2002 census, the village has a population of 126 people.
