= Donja Vrbava =

- Village
- Location within Serbia
- Coordinates: 44°1′0″N 20°35′0″E
- Country: Serbia
- Time zone: UTC+1 (CET)
  - Summer (DST): UTC+2 (CEST)

Donja Vrbava (Serbian: Доња Врбава) is a village in central Serbia. Its inhabitants are known as Vrbavci. Located at 44°1′0″N 20°35′0″E and 538 m above sea level, it lies southwest of the city of Gornji Milanovac and northeast of the city of Kragujevac.

The village was active in the Serbian Revolution, being organized into the knežina (administrative unit) of Kačer during the First Serbian Uprising (1804–13). Milentije Pavlović (1766–1833), Miloš Obrenović's follower, was from Vrbava.

The village had an electrical transformer installed in 2002.
