= Davidovica =

- Village
- Location within Serbia
- Coordinates: 44°09′N 20°25′E
- Country: Serbia
- District: Moravica District
- Municipality: Gornji Milanovac

Population (2002)
  - Total: 91
- Time zone: UTC+1 (CET)
  - Summer (DST): UTC+2 (CEST)

Davidovica is a village in the municipality of Gornji Milanovac, Serbia. According to the 2002 census, the village has a population of 91 people.
