= Ozrem =

- Village
- Location within Serbia
- Coordinates: 44°05′17″N 20°19′13″E
- Country: Serbia
- District: Moravica District
- Municipality: Gornji Milanovac

Population (2002)
  - Total: 343
- Time zone: UTC+1 (CET)
  - Summer (DST): UTC+2 (CEST)

Ozrem is a village in the municipality of Gornji Milanovac, Serbia. According to the 2002 census, the village has a population of 343 people.

The village was active in the Serbian Revolution, being organized into the knežina (administrative unit) of Brusnica (Takovo) during the First Serbian Uprising (1804–13). Among notable local revolutionaries were: Pavle Štula, a momak (bodyguard) of vojvoda Miloš Obrenović; Todor Novaković; Petar Štula; Teodor-Teko Pavlović.
