= Drenova (Gornji Milanovac) =

Coordinates: 44.0333°N 20.3333°E

- Village
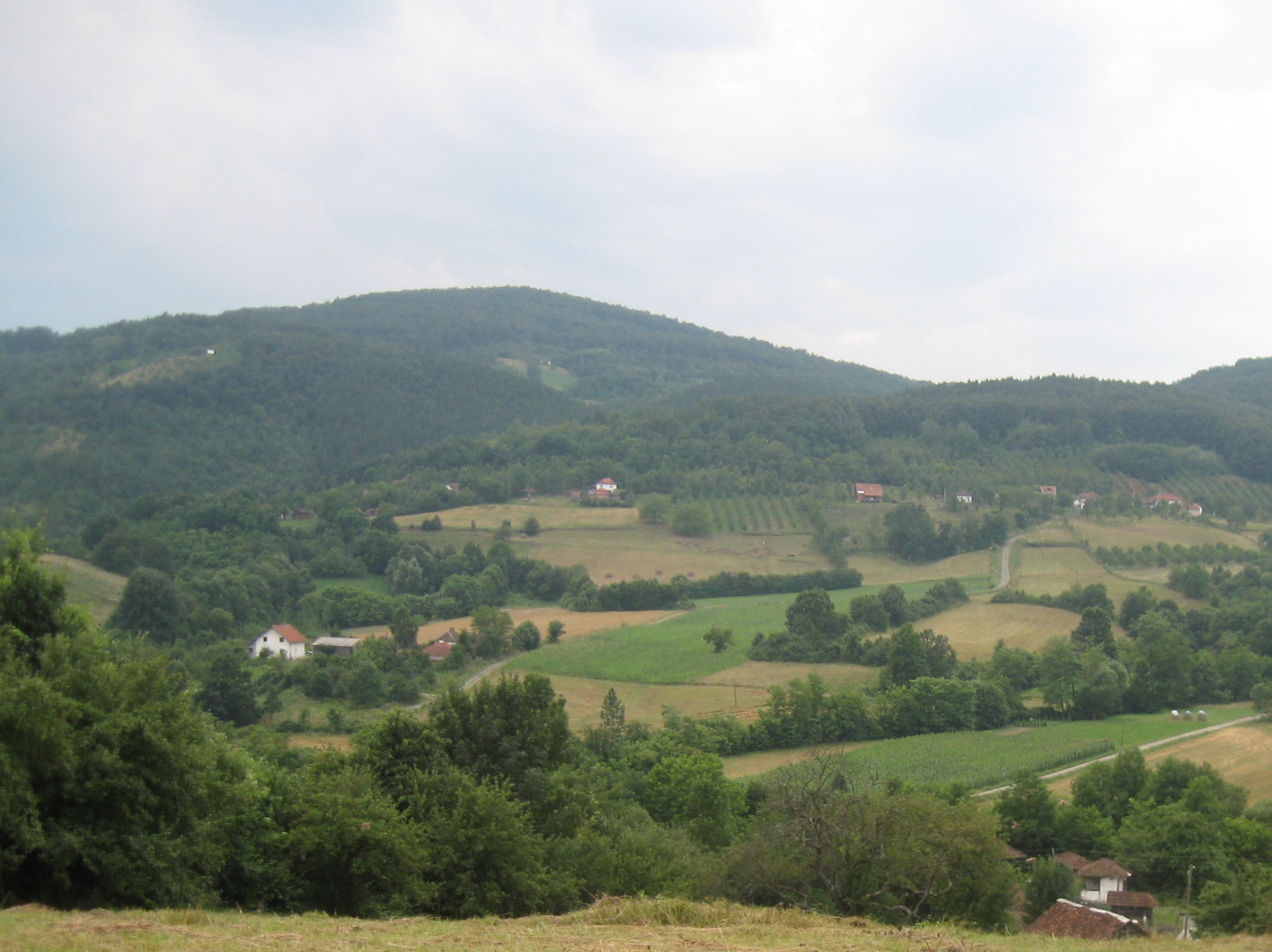
- View of Sovljak from Rudin.
- Interactive map of Drenova
- Country: Serbia
- District: Moravica District
- Municipality: Gornji Milanovac

Population (2002)
  - Total: 264
- Time zone: UTC+1 (CET)
  - Summer (DST): UTC+2 (CEST)

Drenova is a village in the municipality of Gornji Milanovac, Serbia. According to the 2002 census, the village has a population of 264 people.
