= Operation Mihailovic =

German military operation, WW2

- Part of World War II in Yugoslavia
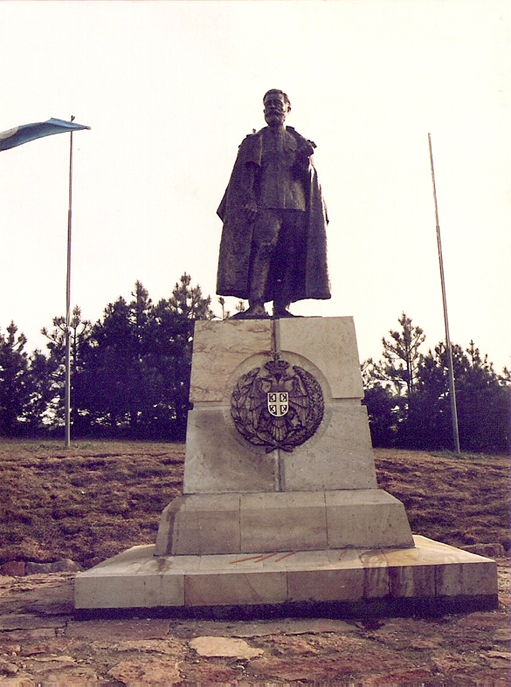
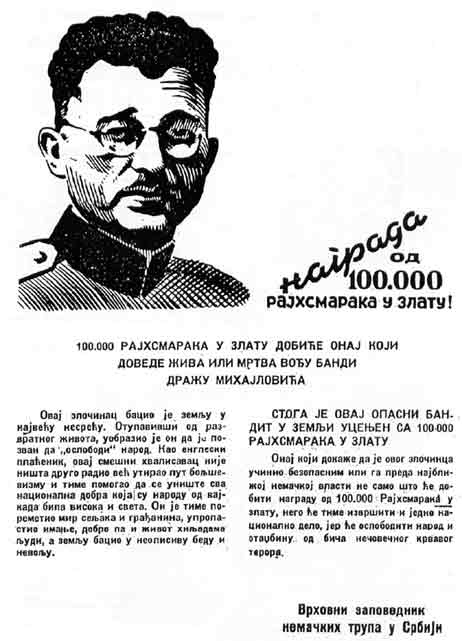
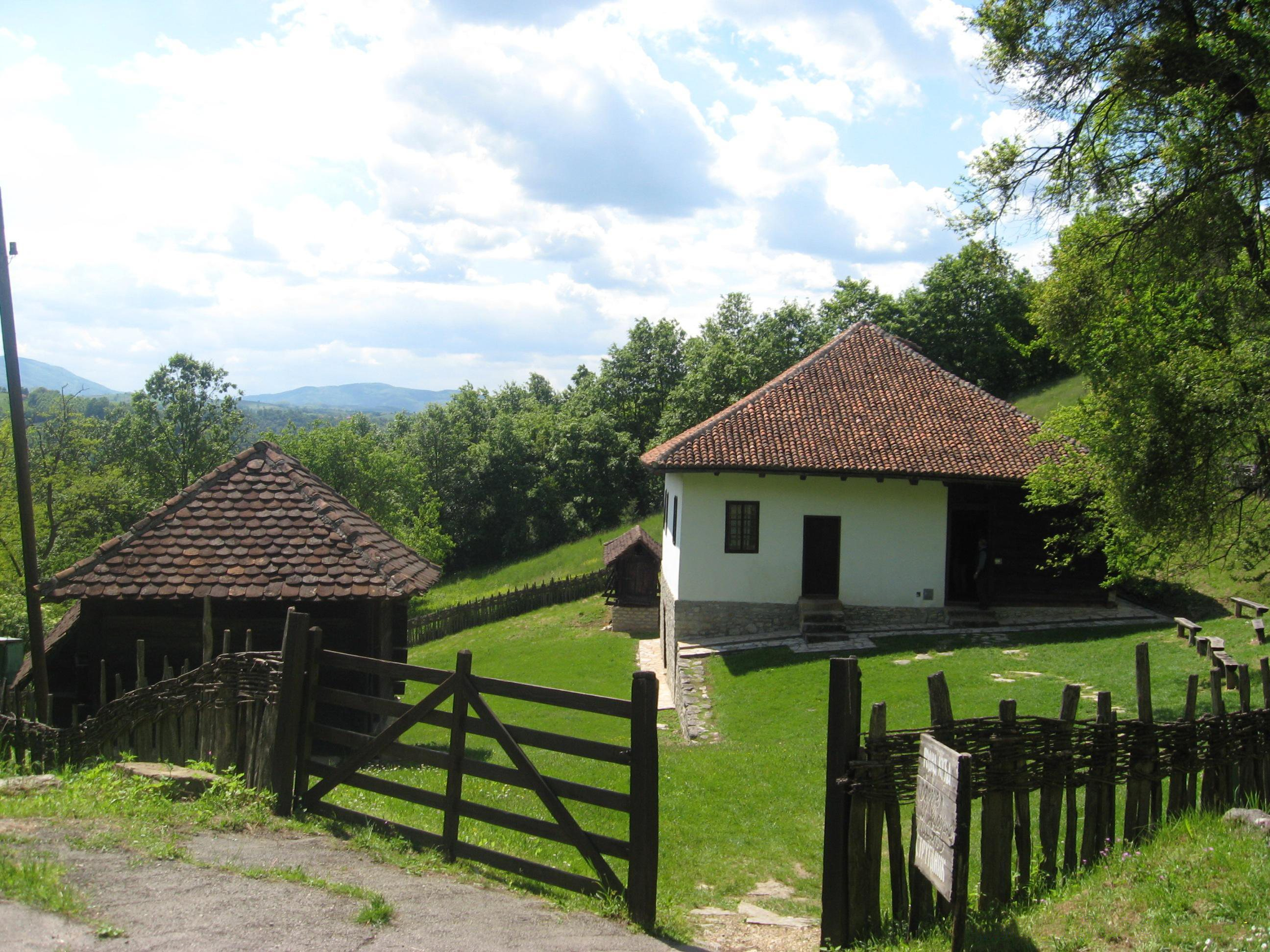
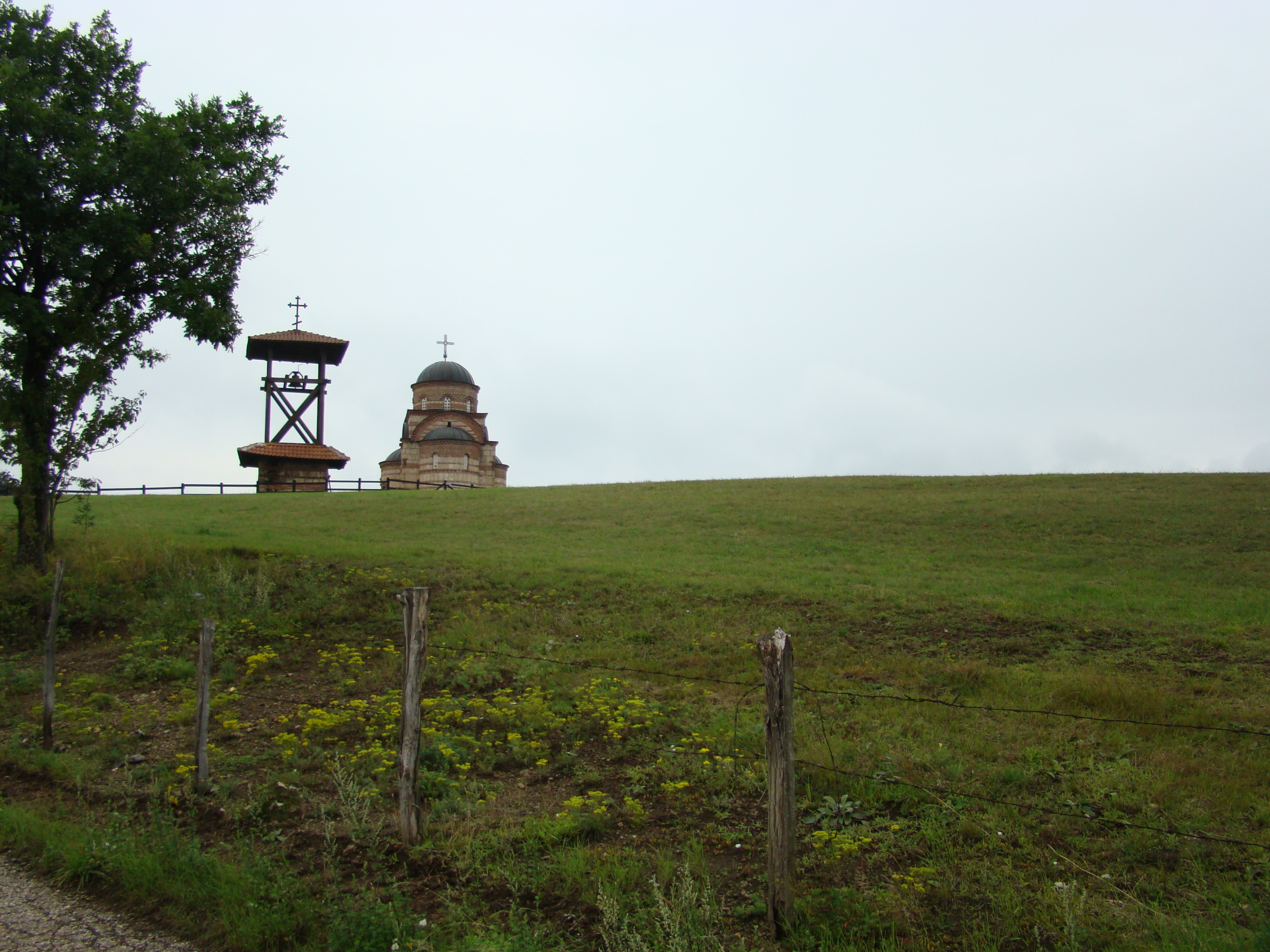
- Clockwise from top left: Monument to Mihailović; German warrant for Mihailović's arrest; house in Struganik which the Chetniks used as their secret headquarters; Ravna Gora field
Date	4–9 December 1941
Location	Territory of the Military Commander in Serbia
Result	German victory

Belligerents
Germany	Chetniks

Commanders and leaders
(Nazi Germany) Franz Böhme (Nazi Germany) Paul Bader (Nazi Germany) Friedrich Zickwolff	(Chetniks) Draža Mihailović (Chetniks) Nikola Kalabić (Chetniks) Aleksandar Mišić (executed)

Units involved
(Nazi Germany) 342nd Infantry Division	Unknown

Casualties and losses
1 killed 1 wounded	12 killed 484 captured

Operation Mihailovic was the final World War II German anti-guerrilla offensive to suppress the Serbian Chetnik detachments of the Yugoslav Army, headed by Colonel Dragoljub Mihailović. The offensive took place from 4 to 9 December 1941 near Šumadija, in the Territory of the Military Commander in Serbia.

== Background ==
On 31 August 1941, the Jadar Chetnik detachment freed Loznica from German occupation in the Battle of Loznica, which was the starting point of the Serbian uprising against German occupation. Earlier, in September, the uprising had taken on large proportions, with the Chetniks freeing the Podrinje and Mačva regions (with the exception of the city of Šabac). In late September and early October, the uprising spread to most of Šumadija and the river valley of Western Morava (including the cities of Čačak, Kraljevo, Kruševac). Slightly later in October, however, the Germans began an offensive against the Chetniks (Operation Drina), when the 342nd Infantry Division attacked from the north and the Croatian forces from Srem attacked from the south. By the end of October, the whole region of Mačva and the central portion of the Podrinje region were taken from the Chetniks, breaking the siege of Valjevo. A westward thrust from the 342nd Infantry Division permitted the Germans to reach Ravna Gora, the main headquarters of the rebels. During October 1941, German forces carried out several mass executions of Serbian civilians in retaliation for their dead and wounded soldiers and to intimidate and pacify the rebellion. About 10,000 Serbian civilians were killed during the mass executions.

A fratricidal war began between the Yugoslav Partisans and the Chetniks in late October 1941. In order to quell the uprising, the Germans brought additional troops and engaged in a campaign of terror against the civilian population. Mihailović, believing that continuing to resist the Germans so openly would only cause further massacres against civilians, eventually resolved to withdraw his troops from the battlefield, turn on the Partisans and seek contact with the German administration in order to find a modus vivendi. The Germans temporarily suspended their pending offensive, waiting for the rebel forces to destroy each other. Mihailović met with representatives of Wehrmacht in the village of Divci. Despite Mihailović's offer of cooperation, the Germans replied that they would soon bring armored units to quickly end the uprising and that the German Wehrmacht would not to burden itself with allies who join them for opportunistic reasons. Mihailović justified his actions by saying that he had to take some towns from the Germans in order to prevent communists from taking them over for themselves, and that he did not want to fight the Germans. He tried to persuade the Germans of his loyalty and requested supplies for combat against the Partisans. He requested that his collaboration remain a secret, so as to avoid fate of Kosta Pećanac, who openly sided with the Axis, and for that reason had lost all respect and influence he had among the Serbian people and was widely considered a traitor.

Despite all of Mihailović's offers, the Germans did not leave him any other option but unconditional surrender. However, the Chetniks and Partisans signed a truce on 20 November of the same year in Čačak, suspending hostilities. The Germans subsequently launched a new offensive, codenamed "Operation Western Morava", lasting from 25 to 30 November, against both the Chetniks and Partisans. Having successfully conducted two offensives in the direction of the Drina River and Western Morava, the German forces closed their ring around Šumadija. The German forces decided to focus their attacks on Ravna Gora, the location of the headquarters of Chetnik Colonel Dragoljub Mihailović.

== The German plan ==
Paul Bader, the newly named German military commander in Serbia, drafted a battle plan on 3 December 1941. He issued orders, stating that the German goals were to destroy Mihailović's detachment and his headquarters south of Valjevo, achieving a total siege of the Ravna Gora headquarters and cleansing an area of 120 square kilometers. The Germans planned to attack Ravna Gora from four directions. Bader chose the 342nd Infantry Division for the operation; it had made the greatest contribution in crushing the Chetnik uprising during the two preceding months. The code name for this final offensive to break the Serbian uprising, Operation Mihailovic, was named for the leader of the Chetnik rebels.

In addition to the planned offensive, the German forces had a psychological advantage of a campaign of terror that was inflicted on the civilian population. The German command had issued an order two months earlier, when the Territory of the Military Commander in Serbia was under Franz Böhme, that for every German military fatality, 100 Serbian civilians would be shot. This caused some panic among the Serbian population.

== The Chetnik plan ==
The commanding staff of the Chetnik detachments knew about the concentration of German forces ready to attack Ravna Gora and made a plan to reduce most of the Chetnik military units to groups of dozens, fives and threes for ease of maneuvering and penetration. Colonel Mihailović thought that the German units would not stay long in inaccessible areas and, after the German forces passed, the Chetnik units could regroup in the same area. For the same reason Colonel Mihailović's plan did not involve a frontal clash with the German forces, hoping they would pass through the area of the offensive without making contact with the Chetniks.

The Chetniks successfully launched a disinformation campaign on the eve of the German offensive, led by Major Ljuba Jovanović, the commander of the gendarme station in Valjevo. The disinformation campaign sent messages to the German forces that the Chetniks would confront them head on. With this effort the Chetniks wanted to increase the German forces' caution and slow their progress towards Ravna Gora. In addition Colonel Mihailović envisaged a special mission for Captain Dragoslav Račić and his forces also to divert the German forces' attention from Ravna Gora.

== German forces ==
In the Territory of the Military Commander in Serbia, just before the start of the uprising, the Germans had three full divisions whose commands were located in Belgrade but the divisions' battalions were deployed elsewhere in the interior. These were the 704th, 714th, and 717th infantry divisions. Around the time of the start of the Chetnik uprising, the Germans transferred the 125th Infantry Regiment from Thessaloniki, on 5 September 1941, but since the rebellion became widespread by the end of September, the German command transferred the 342nd Infantry Division on 23 September to the region from Germany. In mid-November of the same year, the Germans transferred another unit from the Eastern Front to the Territory of the Military Commander in Serbia, the 113th Infantry Division, which had suffered heavy losses; on the Eastern Front its strength had fallen from 20,000 to 14,000 soldiers. The main German force used for breaking the Chetnik uprising was the 342nd Infantry Division (20,000 soldiers), of which 10,000 troops would be used in Operation Mihailović.

== Chetnik forces ==
The command of the guerrilla detachments of the Yugoslav army in early December 1941 was located in the villages at the foot of Ravna Gora. The Ravna Gora Royal Guard, commanded by Lt. Nikola Kalabić and numbering about 500 Chetnik guerrillas at the time, was the supporting unit in the command area. Other Chetnik guerrillas were also in the command area. The other units were divided into smaller sections, such as the Ribnička Brigade under the command of Major Aleksandar Mišić and the Takovo Brigade under the command of Lieutenant Zvonimar Vučković, for easier penetration. These two brigades each had about 300 Chetnik guerrillas. The largest Chetnik unit at the time was the Cer Brigade, under the command of Captain First Class Dragoslav Račić, which was located to the south of Valjevo and whose numerical strength was around 1,200 Chetnik guerrillas at the time. The head of the British SOE military mission, Captain Duane "Bill" Hudson was also located at the Colonel Mihailović's headquarters.

== The offensive ==
Following the order of Paul Bader, the German Military Commander in Serbia, the 342nd Infantry Division began advancing in four columns from opposite directions toward Ravna Gora on 4 December 1941. The first column left from Valjevo and penetrated the village of Divci. Then, on 6 December, it proceeded towards the village of Struganik, forcing a group of Serbian civilians to march in front of them as human shields.

Before the start of the German offensive, Colonel Mihailoivić ordered his units to withdraw from the field of Ravna Gora. However, Colonel Mihailović, while in the command post in the village of Beršić, received a courier around noon on 5 December. The courier brought news that Major Aleksandar Mišić, with part of the Chetnik units from the village of Struganik, intended to execute a frontal attack against the Germans. Colonel Mihailović entrusted command to Lieutenant Colonel Dragoslav Pavlović, who would cut toward Ovcar Kablar Gorge with the supporting Ravna Gora Royal Guard, commanded by Lieutenant Kalabić, according to the previously established plan. Colonel Mihailović, along with Major Zaharije Ostojić and five guerrillas, rode on horseback to Major Mišić in Struganik to personally order him to suspend his frontal attack.

Like the other three columns, the second German column started toward Ravna Gora 4 December 1941. It was the first to leave Valjevo, but went in tho opposite direction of the first column, through the village of Klinci, and penetrated the village of Paune. On 6 December, the second column arrived at the village of Rajkoviće.

The third German combat column started on 4 December from Čačak, going over Gornja Gorijevice during the night between 5 and 6 December and arriving at the village of Družetić. British military mission Captain Hudson and the command unit of the Chetnik detachments, which Colonel Mihailović had entrusted to Lieutenant Colonel Pavlović, were near Družetić. Together with an accompanying unit, Lieutenant Kalabić maneuvered under cover of darkness and managed to escape from the German encirclement. Afterwards, on 6 December, the third German combat column continued past the village of Teočin and toward Brajići.

The fourth German combat column left from Kragujevac on 4 December, traveling through Gornji Milanovac and passed through Takovo and Gornji Banjani. Colonel Mihailović arrived at the village of Struganik on evening of 5 December, where he found Major Mišić and halted his frontal attack.

Early on the morning of 6 December, the first German combat columns went over Razboj Hill, under the protection of tanks and proceeded by civilian human shields, and suddenly penetrated the village of Struganik. The Germans opened fire on the Chetniks, who had sought shelter in a nearby forest. To protect Colonel Mihailović and save the lives of the civilians, Majors Mišić and Ivan Fregl, along with a few Chetniks, presented themselves to the German soldiers, who immediately captured them. Major Mišić falsely presented himself to the Germans as Draža Mihailović. The Germans were surprised, not suspecting a ruse, and temporarily suspended their attack, allowing Colonel Mihailović, Major Ostojić and the rest of the Chetniks to safely retreat from the besieged forest. The Germans later transported Major Mišić and Major Fregl to Valjevo where they were tortured and killed on 17 December 1941.

On the night between 6 and 7 December, Colonel Mihailović bypassed the German forces and stopped at the village of Kadina Luka. All four German combat columns met on 7 December at Ravna Gora, then an empty field, thoroughly searched the grounds, and after a few hours went into nearby villages and burned them as a retaliatory measure. They then went in one large column to Mionica where they continued their pursuit of Mihailović in separate directions. On the next day Colonel Mihailović arrived from Kadina Luka at the village of Teočin near Ravna Gora, which the German forces had searched the previous day. Due to the increased activity of the German forces at the time south and east of the town of Valjevo, Captain Dragoslav Račić, going by previous orders from Colonel Mihailović, transferred the Cer brigade from the mountains of Medvednik to the west of Valjevo near the river Drina, onto the mountain of Bobija. The Cer brigade crossed the Drina River in eastern Bosnia on 12 December, where it joined Serbian rebels under the command of Major Jezdimir Dangić, who from this part of the Independent State of Croatia had created a territory liberated from the Ustasha and Germans in the preceding months.

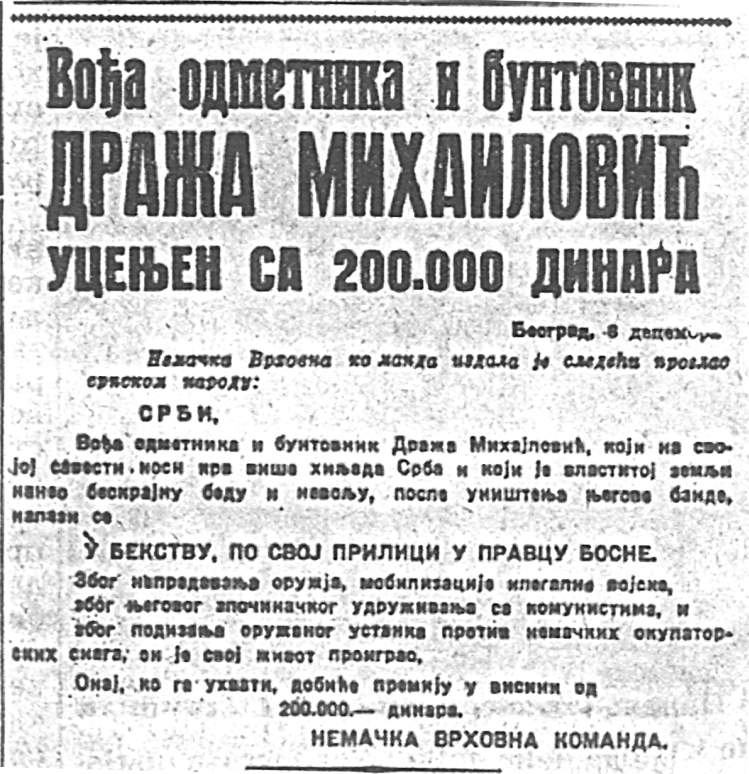
German-produced poster offering 200,000 dinar for the capture of Mihailović, dated 9 December 1941

The German force suspended their offensive on 9 December 1941. Their command wrote a report which stated that during the operation they had killed 12 Chetnik officers and soldiers, captured 482 men and two women, seized 317 guns, 21,000 bullets, three cars, 37 horses, two telegraph stations, one shortwave radio station, and other items. Having failed to eliminate the headquarters of Colonel Mihailović, Paul Bader announced on 9 December through radio, fliers and posters a bounty of 200,000 dinars for the head of Mihailović. The media stated that Mihailović was the leader of a gang of outlaws and accused him of starting the uprising against the German occupation forces and being responsible for spilling the blood of thousands of Serbs. The daily bulletin of the Supreme Command of the Wehrmacht, located in Berlin, noted the following about operation Mihailović on 10 December 1941:

Finished the cleaning action of the western part of the Morava valley of the Mihailovich's group. Mihilović escaped with a small number of followers. Captured the chief of staff Major Aleksandar Mišić, with Headquarters. This has broken the largest group of insurgents in the Territory of the Military Commander in Serbia. Mihailovich's head, a publication of the Serbs, was blackmailed for 200,000 dinars. South-west of Valjevo has the remnants of the gang.

The Germans thought that the "remnants of the gang" were located southwest of Valjevo, when in fact that was the location of the Cer brigade, under Captain Račić, which had arrived there the previous day traveling from the mountains of Medvednik to the mountain of Bobija, in that area, in order to transition into eastern Bosnia, the territory of Major Dangić. The Germans therefore assumed that Colonel Mihailović was with the Cer brigade, as was listed in the poster: Mihailović "is now in hiding, presumably in the direction of Bosnia". However, Colonel Mihailović was actually in the village of Teočin on 10 December, near Ravna Gora, in the same area where he was before the German offensive.

By the end of Operation Mihailovic, the German forces in the Territory of the Military Commander in Serbia had successfully broken the revolt and restored the area and its main transport corridors to German control but failed to destroy Colonel Mihailovic's resistance movement. After the collapse of the uprising the German forces in the area focused their attention and resources in the subsequent months on the eastern part of the Independent State of Croatia, a territory which at the time was controlled by Serbian rebels under the command of Major Dangić, against whom German-Croatian forces would launch an offensive in January 1942.

Up until 21 December 1941 Colonel Mihailović was located in the village of Teočin, where he was joined by Lieutenant Colonel Pavlović, Major Mirko Lalatović, Lieutenant Kalabić, Lieutenant Vučković, radio operator Slobodan Likić, and British SOE Captain Hudson. At this time, Colonel Mihailović received two pieces of news. The first was that, after a proposal by Prime Minister Dušan Simović in the Yugoslav government-in-exile (located in London), by decree of King Peter II of Yugoslavia on 19 December he had been promoted to the rank of brigadier general. The second was much more important for his resistance movement and the Yugoslavian government: the United States had entered the war after the attack on Pearl Harbor.

== Minister in the Forests ==
Because of the growing threat of German pursuit in the area of Ravna Gora, on 22 December 1941 Brigadier General Mihailović transferred to the mountain of Vujan, relocating to the village of Lunjevica, and later found a permanent accommodation in a winter house above the village of Jablanica on 12 January 1942. The new president of the Yugoslavian government (a member of the anti-Hitler coalition in London), academician Slobodan Jovanović, appointed General Mihailović as Minister of the Army, Air Force and Navy in his cabinet on 11 January 1942 because of the merit he achieved, from May to December 1941 in the guerrilla resistance and leading the first mass uprising against the Germans in occupied Europe. King Peter II of Yugoslavia therefore decreed on 19 January that he was promoted to the rank of Division General. By this act the Chetniks had become the legitimate and internationally recognized armed forces of the Kingdom of Yugoslavia by the Allies, because all members of the anti-Hitler coalition (Great Britain, the Soviet Union, Poland, France, Greece, Czechoslovakia and the United States) had established diplomatic relations with and accredited ambassadors to the Yugoslavian government, whose military minister was Dragoljub Mihailović.

== Interesting facts ==
After the capture of Major Aleksandar Mišić and Major Ivan Fregl, the Germans held them in separate cells in the Gestapo prison in Valjevo, where after several days of torture they were executed on 17 December 1941. At the suggestion of Brigadier General Mihailović, the Yugoslavian government in London posthumously awarded Major Mišić with the Order of the Karađorđe's Star with Swords, III class. and Major Fregl with the Order of the Karađorđe's Star with Swords, IV class. on 7 January 1942.

During Operation Mihailovic, the Germans burned several villages near Ravna Gora in Šumadija. The most destroyed villages were Struganik and Koštunići because of their proximity to Ravna Gora. The headquarters of Colonel Mihailović had been located in these villages since May 1941 and he led the uprising against the Germans from there beginning in the late summer of 1941. During the German offensive, on 6 December 1941, soldiers looted and completely destroyed a house in the village of Struganik belonging to the deceased Duke Živojin Mišić, a war hero during World War I. For most of the uprising, Colonel Mihailović's headquarters had been located in the duke's house, who together with the duke's son, Major Mišić, and other officers, had made battle plans against the enemy. The ruins of the duke's house are still preserved today.

The Germans in their wanted poster issued on 9 December 1941 offered a sum of 200,000 dinars to anyone who turned in Colonel Mihailović. This offer was primarily aimed at Serbian peasants because the Germans knew that Mihailović was in their territory. As a reference, in 1941 a pair of good oxen cost about 1000 dinars; the Germans offered the Serbian peasant a sum of money for which he would be able to acquire 400 steers for revealing Colonel Mihailović.

With the uprising's collapse, Mihailović was informed that the invading troops of the January 1942 German-Croatian offensive were issued photos with his image. As a result, General Mihailović began wearing a beard after the collapse of the Serbian uprising.

General Mihailović's headquarters during January 1942 were located in a house above the village of Jablanica, on the slopes of the snow-covered Vujan mountain. At this location General Mihailović was informed through BBC radio news, enabled by liaison officer Captain Josip Grbec, that he had been appointed Minister of the Army, Navy and Air Force.
