= Bjelogrlić =

Bjelogrlić (Serbian Cyrillic: Бјелогрлић) is a Serbian surname, derived from bjelo grlo ("white throat"). It is found in Serbia, Bosnia and Herzegovina and Montenegro. It may refer to:

- Dragan Bjelogrlić (born 1963), Serbian actor
- Goran Bjelogrlić, Serbian film producer
- Radovan Bjelogrlić, Bosnian Serb politician
- Aleksandar Bjelogrlic, Serbian writer
- Vera Belogrlić, Serbian director

== Anthropological studies ==
According to Jefto Dedijer's study Hercegovina (Belgrade, 1909) and Novak Mandić Studo's monograph Zemlja zvana Gacko ("Land Called Gacko") the Bjelogrlići originate from a bride of the Okiljević family who lived sometime in the second half of the 17th century. She was a beauty, and was nicknamed Bjelogrla, and had been married to a member of the Pamučina clan in Slivnica (a hamlet of Zagradinje) near Trebinje. After her husband's death, she returned a widow to her family in Lipnik near Gacko with her two sons. Her descendants adopted the surname.

Families with the surname in Foča and Bileća (where branches are also surnamed Drinjak and Drinjac), are said to hail from the Ilići and Kaluđerovići brotherhoods from Bjelica, near Cetinje, Montenegro.

Families from elsewhere in Herzegovina are said to hail from the Miljanići from Banjani, Montenegro.
