= Pavle Orlović =

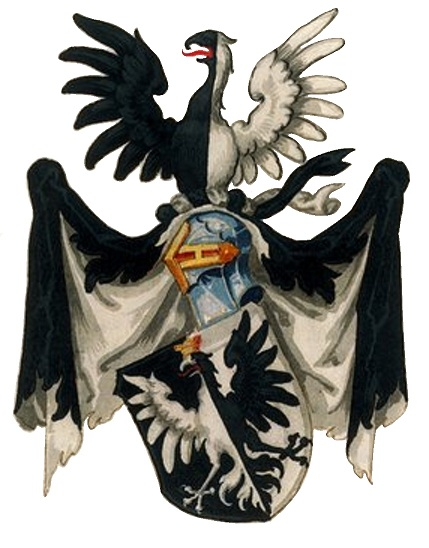
Orlović coat of arms

Pavle Orlović (Serbian Cyrillic: Павле Орловић) is a semi-mythological hero of the Kosovo cycle of Serbian epic poetry; he was a Serbian vitez ("knight"), one of the military commanders under Prince Lazar that fell at the Battle of Kosovo (1389) against the Ottoman Empire. According to folklore, Orlović was the son of vojvoda Vuk Orle, the Lord of Soko Grad on the Drina. After the death of Stefan Uroš V, Orlović held the mining town of Novo Brdo, as well as his father's possessions on Mount Rudnik in central Serbia.

According to legend, Pavle Orlović's four sons escaped their hometown to Čarađe, near Gacko, after the death of their father and fled to Velimlje, a village in Banjani (modern-day Montenegro). After the Ottoman conquest of Banjani, they established several families of the Orlović clan at Čarađe, Bjelice and Cuce.

Documents in the Ragusan archives mention that the hero of Kosovo and barjaktar (flag-bearer) Pavle Orlović lived below the sheer mount of Orlin at the end of a village below which the neighbouring village of Čarađe lied. According to Marko Šuica, there is no information on him in historical sources.

== Kosovo Maiden ==
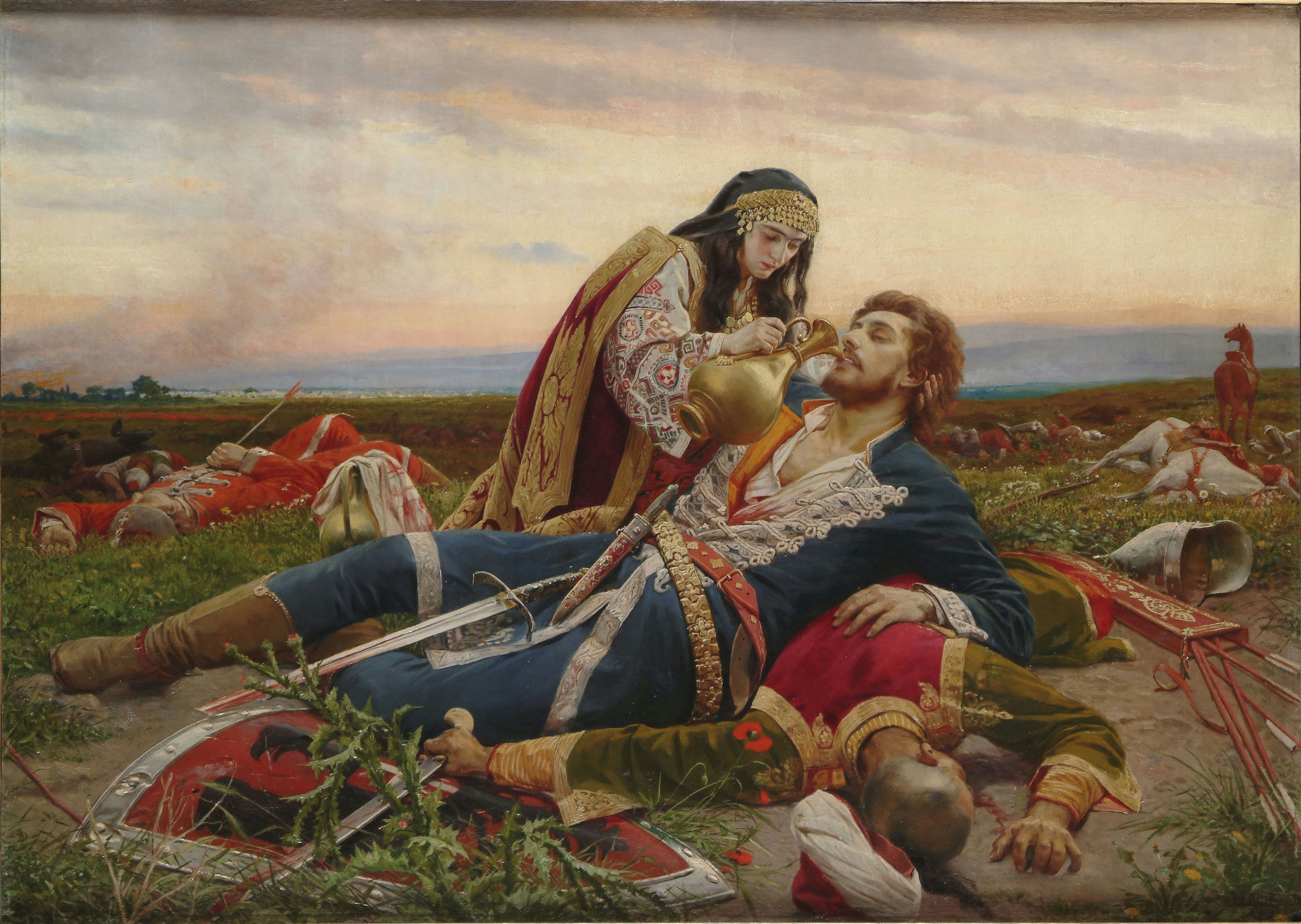
Kosovo Maiden, by Uroš Predić (1919)

Early rose the maiden of Kosovo, Early rose she on a Sunday morning, Rose before the brilliant sun had risen. She has rolled the white sleeves of her robe back, Rolled them back up to her soft white elbows; On her shoulders, fair white bread she carries, In her hands two shining golden goblets, In one goblet she has poured fresh water, And has poured good red wine in the other. Then she seeks the wide plain of Kosovo, Seeks the noble Prince's place of meeting, Wanders there amongst the bleeding heroes. When she finds one living midst the wounded Then she l[e]aves him with the cooling water, Gives him, sacramentally, the red wine, Pledges with her fair white bread the hero.

Fate at last has led her wand'ring footsteps Unto Pavle Orlović, the hero, Who has borne the Prince's battle-standard. From his gaping wounds the blood is streaming, His right hand and his left foot are severed; And the hero's ribs are crushed and broken, But he lingers still amongst the living. From the pools of blood she drags his body And she l[e]aves him with the cooling water, Red wine, sacramentally, she gives him, Pledges then with fair white bread the hero. When at length his heart revives within him, Thus speaks Pavle Orlović, the hero: "Oh dear sister, Maiden of Kosovo, What great need compels thee here to wander, Thou, so young, amongst the wounded heroes? What dost thou upon the field of battle? Dost thou seek a brother's son, or brother, Dost thou seek perchance an aged father?" Answered him the Maiden of Kosovo: "Oh dear brother ! Oh thou unknown warrior! None of my own race am I now seeking, Not a brother's son nor yet a brother, Neither do I seek an aged father. Wast thou present, oh thou unknown warrior, When for three whole weeks to all his army Prince Lazar the Sacrament was giving By the hands of thirty holy fathers, In the splendid church of Samodreža; When Lazar and all the Serbian army There the Holy Sacrament have taken, Three Voyvodas last of all did enter: First of them was Miloš, the great warrior, Ivan Kosančić was close behind him, And the third, Toplica Milan, followed.

"I by chance stood then within the doorway When there passed young Miloš, the great warrior, In the whole world no more splendid hero; On the ground his clanking saber trailing, Silken cap with proudly waving feathers, Many-colored mantle on his shoulders And around his neck a silken kerchief. Then he gazes round and looks upon me, He takes off his many-colored mantle, Takes it off, and gives it to me, saying:" "Here, oh Maiden, is my colored mantle, By it thou wilt keep me in remembrance, By this mantle shall my name live with thee. Now, dear Maid, must I go forth to perish There where camps the noble Prince's army; Pray to God for me, dear Maid, my sister, That I may come back again in safety. And that all good fortune may attend thee I will marry thee to my friend Milan, Him whom God has given me as brother, My friend Milan who is my sworn brother. In God's name and good Saint John's, I promise I will be a groomsman at thy wedding."

"Ivan Kosančić was close behind him, In the whole world no more splendid hero; On the ground his clanking saber trailing, Silken cap with proudly waving feathers, Many-colored mantle on his shoulders And around his neck a silken kerchief, On his hand a golden ring is shining. Then he gazes round and looks upon me, Takes the golden ring from off his finger, Takes it off and gives it to me, saying:" "Here hast thou my ring of gold, oh Maiden, By it thou wilt have me in remembrance, By this gold ring shall my name live with thee. Now, dear maid, must I go forth to perish There where camps the noble Prince's army; Pray to God for me, dear Maid, my sister, That I may come back again in safety. And that all good fortune may attend thee I will marry thee to my friend Milan, Him whom God has given me as brother, My friend Milan who is my sworn brother. In God's name and good Saint John's, I promise I myself will give thee to the bridegroom."

"Then Toplica Milan follows after, In the whole world no more splendid hero; On the ground his clanking saber trailing, Silken cap with proudly waving feathers, Many-colored mantle on his shoulders And around his neck a silken kerchief, On his hand a golden ring is shining And upon his arm a golden bracelet. Then he gazes round and looks upon me, From his arm he takes the golden bracelet, Takes it off and gives it to me, saying:" "Here, oh Maiden, is my golden bracelet, By it thou wilt have me in remembrance. Now, dear Maid, must I go forth to perish There where camps our noble Prince's army; Pray to God for me, dear soul, my darling, That I may come back again in safety; Then, dear Maid, that good luck may attend thee, I will take thee for my true beloved."

"And then went away these mighty leaders, And to-day I seek them here, oh brother, Seek them here, upon the field of battle !

Pavle Orlović then makes her answer "Oh dear sister, Maiden of Kosovo, Dost thou see, dear soul, those battle-lances Where they lie most thickly piled together There has flowed the life-blood of the heroes; To the stirrups of the faithful horses, To the stirrups and the girths it mounted, Mounted to the heroes silken girdles, And the three have fallen there together. Now return thee to thy fair white castle Lest thy skirts and sleeves with blood be spattered."

To the hero's words the maiden listens, Down her white face are the fast tears falling; She returns then to her fair white castle. From her white throat pour her lamentations: "Woe is me, what fate I bear within me, I but touch the young and tender sapling And the fair green pine must surely wither."

== Other folklore ==
According to folklore, Orlović was the son of voivode Vuk Orle, the Lord of Soko Grad on the Drina. After the death of Stephen Uroš V the Weak, Orlović held the mining town of Novo Brdo, as well as his father's possessions on Mt. Rudnik in central Serbia.

Serbian historian Jovan Mišković collected folk tellings in Teočin, in which Orlović had left for Kosovo with his 77 friends, and did not return (1933).

== Legacy ==
- The Montenegrin flag bearers of the Montenegrin–Ottoman War (1876–1878), who also carried the Krstaš-barjak of the Serbian Revolution, had their idols in Boško Jugović and Pavle Orlović.
- The noble families of Martinović from Bajice near Cetinje in Montenegro, and Samardžić from Krivošije claim Orlović as their ancestor. Until the 17th century the families were also known as Martinović-Orlović and Samardžić-Orlović. The Martinović family descends from Bajo Orlović and the Samardžić family descends from Bajo's brother Savo. There are many other descendants of Pavle Orlović, but without recognized status of nobility. The Serbian scientist Nikola Tesla is a descendant of the Orlović.
- Serbian painter Uroš Predić depicted Pavle Orlović in his painting "Kosovo Maiden".
- According to the Serbian rock band Orthodox Celts' lead vocalist Aleksandar Petrović, their song Green Roses is a story told by dying Pavle Orlović after the Battle of Kosovo, but before the Kosovo Maiden finds him.
- Serbian writer Svetislav Simić adopted the name as pseudonym.
