= Orlović clan =

Noble House in Serbia

Orlović Орловић
- Noble house
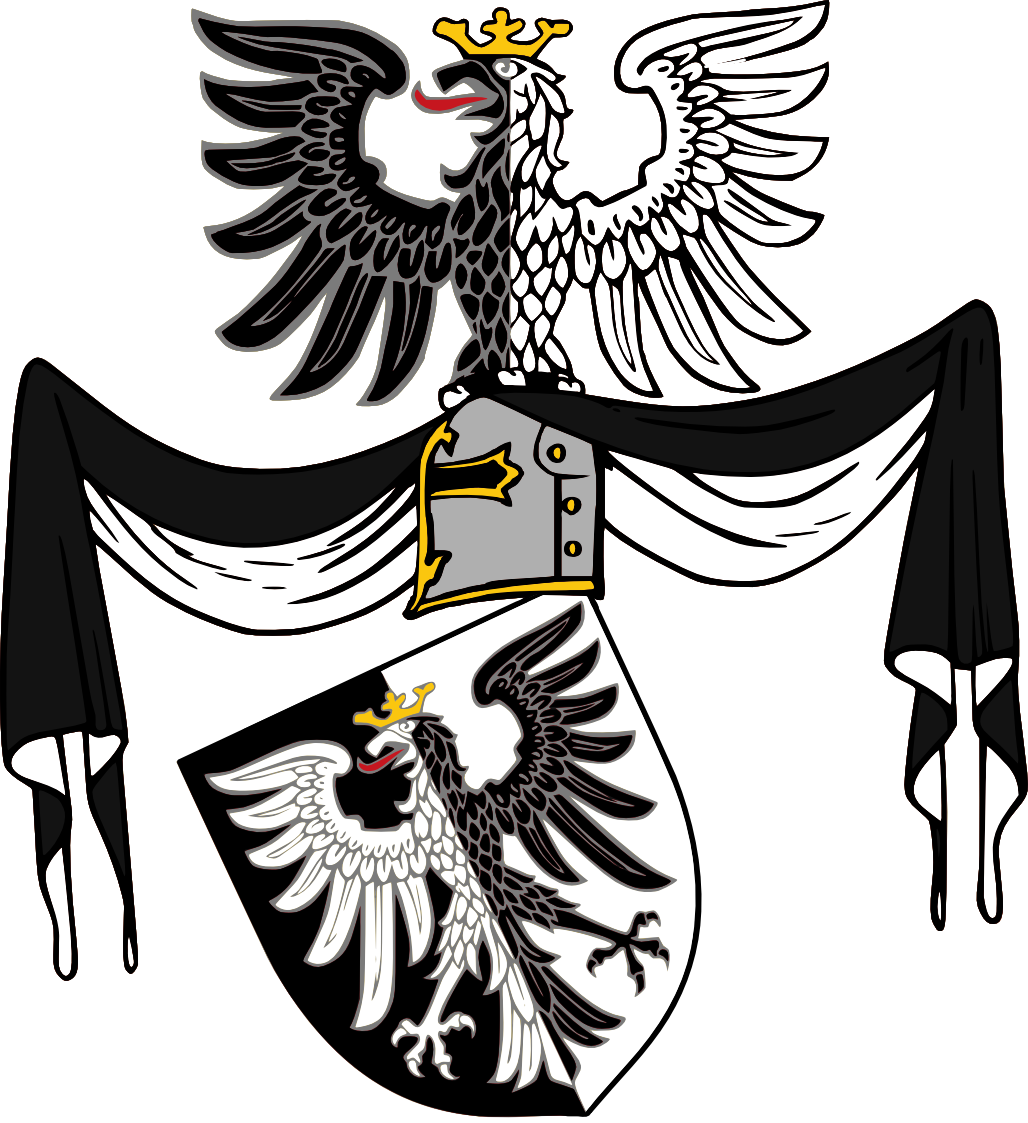
- Coat of arms of the Dukes and Counts Orlovic
- Country: Kingdom of Serbia
- Founded: c. 1320
- Founder: Duke Orle
- Titles: Prince [?] (Knez); Duke (Vojvoda); Count (Serdan)
- Cadet branches: Princes and Dukes Orlović; Princes and Dukes Martinović; Royal house Obrenović

Orlović
Origin
- Language: Serbian
- Meaning: "descendant of Orle"

Other names
- Variant form: Orlovčić
- Anglicisation: Orlovich

The Orlović family (Serbian Cyrillic: Орловић, pl. Orlovići / Орловићи) is an old Serbian noble family originating in the medieval Serbia.

The Orlović clan, according to the preserved collective memory of its descendants as well as the collective memory and epic tradition of Serbs and Montenegrins on the whole, played a major role in the history of these countries, from the Middle Ages to the time of the liberation from the Ottoman rule. Andrija Luburić, in the introduction to his book dedicated to the Orlović clan said:

The clan Orlović, by the number of homes and by their merits in the Serb liberation takes the first place in the old Montenegro. Their past can be followed from the (battle of) Kosovo and it represents one bright thread through a very dark history of Montenegro in the years after 1482

Most of the families claiming descent from the Orlović have John the Baptist as their patron saint (see: slava).

== Legend ==
According to a legend, upon the death of Pavle Orlović, his four sons escaped from their hometown, Čarađe, near Gacko, and fled to the village of Velimlje, in Banjani (medieval state of Zeta, modern-day Montenegro). The Turks soon conquered Banjani, and the Orlović brothers, after spending merely a winter there, Bajko, Bjelan and Nenoje (other sources call him "Bajo"), continued on to Ržani do in Cuce, whereas, the fourth brother, Tepo, returned to Čarađe and founded the clan Tepavčevići. Bajko, Bjelan and Nenoje later established a church in the village dedicated to their patron saint, Saint John. However, Bajko later moved to Zaljut in Cuce with the rest of his family, effectively branching off and creating the Bajkovići clan. Bjelan with his family moved to Resna, thus founding the clan Bjelice. One of his most famous descendants is voivode Milija, a prominent figure of the national Montenegrin epic The Mountain Wreath, written by Petar II Petrović-Njegoš. From voivode Milija descend the brotherhood Milići. Nenoje (Bajo) moved to the last retreat, in the wake of the advancing Ottoman Turks, of the last Zetan medieval dynasty, Cetinje (an area called Bajice), with his family, thus founding the Martinovići clan.

According to one of the versions of the Orlović family story Jovan Erdeljanović heard in Bajice, four brothers did in fact relocate from Gacko to Cuce. However, they were named as follows: Bajko, Bjelan, Nenoje and Čejo. Bajko remained in Cuce, where his offspring founded the Bajković clan. Bjelan moved to Bjelice, and his descendants founded the modern-day clans of Milići, Abramovići, etc. Nenoje moved to Bajice, where his descendants would later branch off into the Martinović and Vuksanović clans. Čejo returned to Gacko and converted to Islam, effectively creating the Čengić clan. According to this legend, there were three more brothers, who had initially remained in Čarađe. One of the brothers would establish the Samardžić clan in Krivošije. The second brother was the ancestor of the Bandići in Komani, as well as the Đuričkovići in Zagarač. The third brother converted to Islam and established the prominent Muslim Osmanagić family in Podgorica.

However, Kovijanić considers more probable the version according to which Pavle's so-called "sons" were actually his relatives, even though he doesn't elaborate on that at all. On the other hand, when talking about the true timeframe of the migration of the Orlović family, Kovijanić relies exclusively on historical documents, not on oral tradition, which "popular tradition ties to the fall of Herzegovina (1482). Thus Jireček cites that the first mention of the clan Bjelica in Konavli, region adjacent to Dubrovnik and repossessed by them at that time, dates from 1430 ("50-60 houses of Vlachorum Belize from Zeta") Kovijanić cites a document from the coastal town of Kotor, dated September 1, 1440, that records a money lending contract between Thudor Nenoe Ivanovich from Cetinje and Luka Pautinov from Kotor, whereby Ivanovich promises to repay the sum he lent to buy an armor by Christmas time or with a 20% interest thereafter. Since Ivanovich is a patronymic revealing the name of his grandfather Ivan and father Nenoe, Kovijanić concludes that, given the timeframe, Ivan could well have been a contemporary of the main actors of the Battle of Kosovo, including his relative Pavle Orlović himself, one of the two main characters of the folk epic poem The Kosovo Maiden It is probably on the basis of this information contrasted with many versions of the story of the family migration and those involved in it which overlap but are not identical, that Kovijanić concludes that it is more likely that the migration did not involve direct offspring of Pavle Orlović but his (many) relatives. Kovijanić also holds that, contrary to Erdeljanović, the toponyms in Bajice that carry the imprint of the old family name Orlović after the immigrants from Čarađe and not after some previous inhabitants of Bajice. In any event, Ivan stands as the first known ancestor of the famous five brothers Martinović from Njegoš's Mountain Wreath.

Voivode Bijela, who is also known as "Rade" and "Orli Ban", was the grandson of Martin Orlović (Pavle's brother) and is said to have been the lord of the fortress of Moštanica in Župa Nikšićka. In 1482, the Turks attacked the fort, and Bijela heroically died in the aftermath. Accounts place Tepo and Bajo, supposed sons of Pavle Orlović, as actually being the sons of Bijela, along with Čejo and Jovan.

Tepo Orlović, also known as Vaso, had four sons. One of his sons decided to carry the surname Tepavčević in honor of his father. His second son, Manojlo, fathered what would soon become the Manojlovići. The third son, Damjan, became the ancestor of the Damjanovići, who, due to external conflicts, later split up into branches, the Herzegovinian branch carrying the surname Damjanac and the Montenegrin branch carrying Damjančević. As if this weren't enough, a member of the Damjanovići later split from the clan and established the Bjeković family.

According to Andrija Luburić, after the deaths of Pavle Orlović and Damnjan Tomković, Pavle's mother, pregnant at the time, journeyed to Dubrovnik with her son, Milija. On the road, they ate in the town of Gacko, where they spent the night with knez Vratko. Pavle's mother had come to like knez Vratko's daughter, and she arranged a marriage for her and her Milija. After the wedding, Milija remained in Gacko with his in-laws meanwhile his mother continued her journey to Dubrovnik. Once she reached Dubrovnik, she gave birth to Martin Orlović, who was baptised Catholic. The duo later return to Gacko to live with Milija.

Milija's grandson, Bijela, was a voivode in Gacko and held a fortress on the Bjelatice mountains near the village of Krsce. This fort defended the Duga Gorge, and the road to Nikšić. Bijela fought with the neighboring Turks from the fortress in nearby Ključa for 20 years (Ključa was captured by the Turks in 1463). In 1482, after years of fighting, the Turks were finally able to conquer Bijela's fortress, sending him and his family to Banjani. They remained there for a spring and all but one of his sons relocated to Montenegro and settled in various parts of the Katunska nahija.

Meanwhile, Martin's grandson, Rade (or Orli Ban), held a fortress in Moštanica, near Nikšić. In 1482, after courageously defending the fortress against Turkish invasion, the Turks captured the fortress and captured Rade.

Another account has a certain Šćepan Orlović, possibly son of Bajo Orlović, fathering three sons: Bajko, Culo (Cuko) and Bjelan (Bjelo). Bjelan, served as the ancestor of the Orlovići in Bjelice. Two of Bajko's sons, Vučić and Vučeta, later branched off and founded the Bajković clan in Cuce, ultimately, with their uncle Culo, becoming the ancestors of the Orlovići in Cuce. Meanwhile, Nenoje, Radonja, Raič and Savo, also Bajko's sons, relocated to Bajice, where they became the ancestors of the Orlovići in Bajice. The Martinovići are said to descend from Nenoje, while the Bandići are said to have descended from Radonja's sons, Vuk and Sekula.

Orlović family is now the oldest living Serbian noble house dating from Vuk Orle (13th century).

== Orlić clan ==
The Orlić (Serbian Cyrillic: Орлић, pl. Orlići / Орлићи) are descendants of Pavle Orlović and are connected to the oldest living Serbian noble house dating from Vuk Orle.

Traditionally, the Orlić surname is associated with the area of Lika in modern-day Croatia but many of the descendants of the Orlić clan can be found all over the world.

According to legend, after the death of Pavle Orlović at the Battle of Kosovo (depicted by the famous Kosovo Maiden painting), his four sons escape their hometown, Čarađe, near Gacko, and flee to a village called "Velimlje", in Banjani (modern-day Montenegro). One of his sons (historians dis-agree as to which one) decided to carry the surname Orlić (Eaglette) in honor and natural succession of the Orlović (Eagle) surname. The Orlić clan then settled in Petrovac in modern-day Montenegro.

In the 1550s the majority of the Orlić clan emigrated to Krbava in modern-day Croatia. They fled from the onslaught of the Ottoman Empire. In 1638, a number of the Orlic clan relocated further north west to Brinje to the villages of Draškovica and Vodoteć where they lived, tax free, defending the Austro-Hungarian empire from the Ottomans. Nowadays, members of the Orlić clan are found all across the former Yugoslavia.

One of the earliest prominent members of the Orlić clan was Petar Orlić, a famous general leader of the Uskoks of Senj who defended the Austro-Hungarian Empire against the onslaught of the Ottoman Turks.

There are many other descendants of Pavle Orlović, but without recognized status of nobility. The most famous non-noble descendant of Pavle Orlović is Serb scientist Nikola Tesla who was born in the region of Lika in modern-day Croatia. Other noble descendants of House of Orlović are royal families of Karađorđević through Princess Ljubica "Ziva" of Serbia, and House of Savoy through Queen Elena of Italy, daughters of Nicholas I of Montenegro, and Montenegrin Royal house of Petrović Njegoš through various members of the Martinović family.

== Descendants ==
- Bajkovići (descendants of Baj(k)ov Šćepanov Orlović)
  - Borilovići (descendants of Borilo (Boroja) Bajkov Bajković)
  - Nikolići (descendants of Nikola Nenojev Bajkov Bajković)
- Bjelice tribe, descendants of voivode Bijele
  - Milići (Katunska nahija), descendants of voivode Milija Orlović
    - Lončarevići (Bjelice) descendants of Milići
    - Božovići (Zagora, Lješanska nahija) - descendants of Božo Milić (around 1700)
  - Abramovići
- Martinovići (descendants of Martin (V)Latkov Nikolin Nikolić-Orlović)
  - Batrićevići (descendants of Batrić Martinov Martinović-Orlović)
  - Ivanovići (descendants of Ivan Martinov Martinović-Orlović)
  - Markovići (descendants of Marko Martinov Martinović-Orlović)
  - Miloševići (descendants of Miloš Martinov Martinović-Orlović)
  - Obrenovići (descendants of Obren Jovanov Martinov Martinović-Orlović)
  - Tomašević (descendants of Tomaš Martinov Martinović-Orlović)
  - Raičevići (descendants of Raič (V)Latkov Nikolin Nikolić-Orlović)
    - Djolević
    - Muhović
    - Prenkić
- Koskići (descendants of Jovan ... Martinov Vukov Orlović)
  - Osmanagići (according to A. Luburić)
- Samardžići from Krivošije, descendants of Savo Orlović
- Komnenovići
  - Osmanagići
- Tepavčevići (descendants of Tepo Bijelin Orlović)
  - Manojlovići (descendants of Manojlo Tepov Bijelin Orlović)
  - Lalovići (descendants of Lale(?) Tepov Bijelin Orlović)
  - Damjanovići (descendants of Damjan Tepov Bijelin Orlović)
    - Damjanci
    - Damjančevići
    - Bjekovići
- Čengić, a famous Muslim family from Herzegovina, traces their descendance from Čejo Orlović, who was recognized as a spahi and bey by Ottoman Turks after his conversion to Islam. Čengić family was always aware of their noble status over ordinary Bosnian Muslim and Orthodox Serb families. The most prominent member of Čengić family was Smail-aga Čengić, whose death was described in the poem The Death of Smail-aga Čengić by Croatian Romantic poet Ivan Mažuranić.
- Osmanagić, a Muslim family from Podgorica, are either descendants of unnamed member of Samardžić family who after conversion took the name Osman, and that he was granted title of Aga (hence Osman-aga; Osmanagići). According to Andrija Luburić, however, it is said that the Osmanagići descend from Jovan Orlović, Martin Orlović's grandson. It is said that Jovan was imprisoned by the Turks as a child in Gacko during his family's escape to Montenegro. Jovan was taken to Mostar and later "turkicized", meaning converted to Islam. According to certain documents, Jovan's descendants were called the Koskići and they lived in Mostar. In 1650, the Koskići relocated to Podgorica. During the Moravian War, Elez-aga Koskić saved two of the greatest Brda heroes, Petar Bošković from Bjelopavlići and Novo Popović from Kuči. When the vizier in Scutari heard news of such event, he had Elez-aga decapitated, his mother and two women killed and had the rest of the Koskići killed off and scattered. One Koskić who carried the surname Osmanagić survived, and from him descend the modern-day Osmanagići.
