= Bjelice =

Historical region and tribe of old Montenegro

The Old Montenegro and its tribes. Bjelice are marked with number 4.

Bjelice (Serbian: Бјелице/Bjelice) is a historical region and tribe of the Katunska nahija region of Old Montenegro. The tribe was one of the largest traditional tribes of Old Montenegro and one of nine tribes of the Katunska nahija, along with Cetinje, Njeguši, Ćeklići, Cuce, Ozrinići (Čevo), Pješivci, Zagarač and Komani.

== Geography ==
The Bjelice region is located 20–50 km northwest of Cetinje. It is of a relatively high altitude (800–900 meters above sea level) and is surrounded by high mountains – Čelinac, Štavor and Čevski lisac. Today, Bjelice is considered a geographic region corresponding to the territory of the traditional tribe.

== History ==
Czech historian Konstantin Jireček noted that Bjelice was first mentioned as a territory around 1430 ("de zente Bielice"). They are also mentioned in a 1431 document found in the Kotor Archives, and in the Ottoman defter (tax registry) from 1521. Bjelice are described as a village comprising 80 houses and four hamlets: Lješev Stup (Lješev Stub), Prediš, Rešna (Resna) and Slatković. It is believed that Bjelice, along with the clans (brotherhoods) of Cuce and Bajice, are the descendants of the Orlović clan. Pavle Orlović is a Serb legendary hero who fell at the Battle of Kosovo (1389), which legend holds that these clans are his descendants, it is likely it was from his brothers (as there are no written records of him having any descendants). The Orlović flight from Kosovo before the advancing Ottomans had them settle in around Gacko and neighboring villages (Čarađe, Bjeletaci). They later moved to Banjani and finally to the territory of Old Montenegro.

In 17th century Ceklin tribe expelled Bjelice from the territory they inhabit today (around Skadar Lake and Rijeka Crnojevića).

In 1829 Bjelice struggled against Ozrinići and Cuce, two neighboring tribes, and Petar I Petrović-Njegoš sent Sima Milutinović Sarajlija and Mojsije to negotiate peace among them.

== Anthropology ==
=== Brotherhoods ===
The Bjelice tribe was divided into Upper (Gornje) Bjelice and Lower (Donje) Bjelice. Like most tribes, it also consisted of numerous brotherhoods and families. The largest brotherhood was Milići whose branch are Lončarevići. Older brotherhoods are also Abramović, Andrić, Pejović, Kuzman, Popivoda, Tomić and Mikulić while there is also a number of younger brotherhoods. Many emigrants from the tribe took Bjelica for their surname.

== See also ==
- Bjelica, surname
