= Azbukovica =

Geographical subregion of Podrinje, Serbia

Coordinates: 44.2000°N 19.5000°E

Azbukovica Азбуковица
- Geographic region of Serbia
- Interactive map of Azbukovica
- Country: Serbia
- Seat: Ljubovija

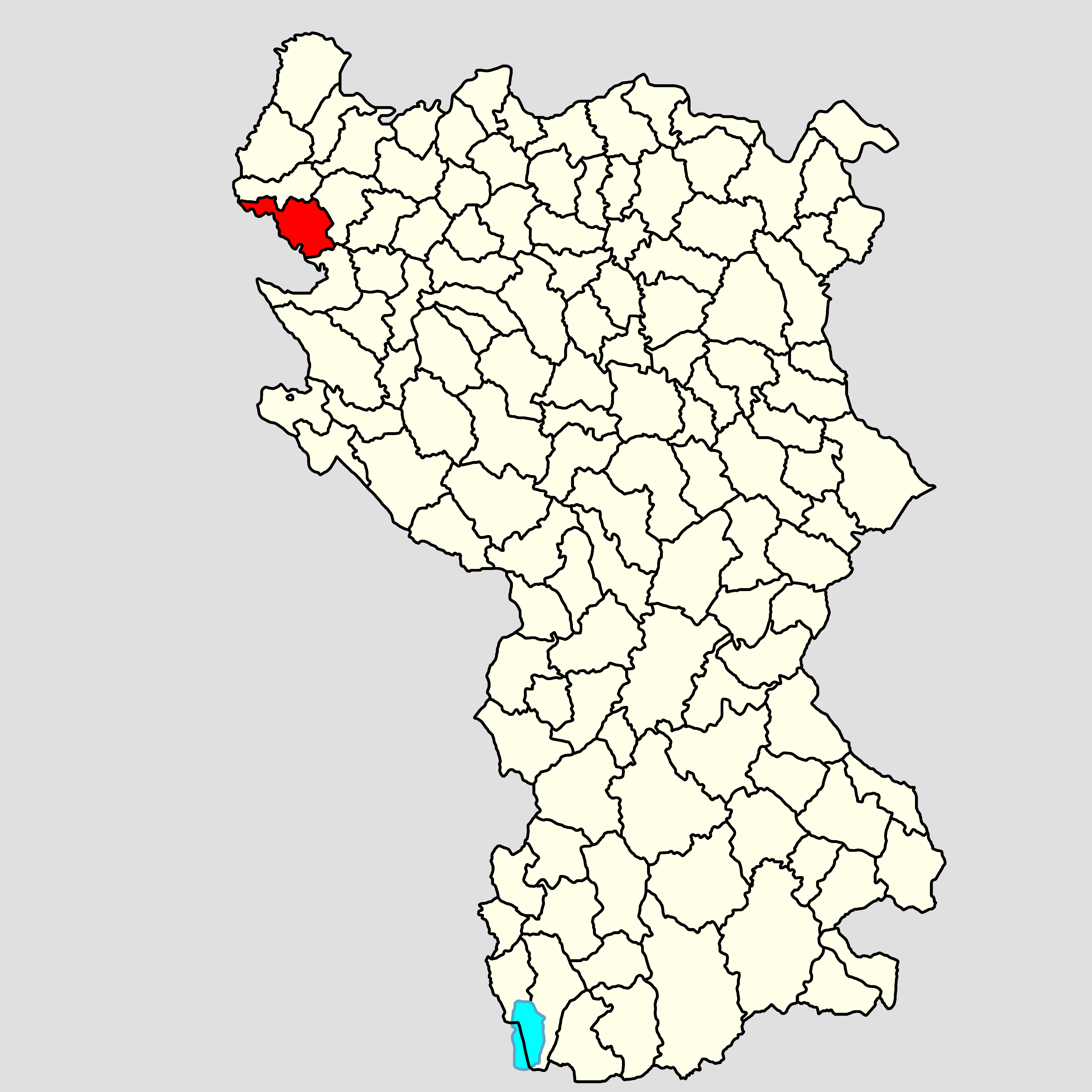
Srez Azbukovica in the Kingdom of Serbia

Azbukovica (Serbian Cyrillic: Азбуковица) is a highland area in western Serbia, encompassing the municipality of Ljubovija. It borders to the northwest municipality of Mali Zvornik, to the north municipality of Krupanj, to the northeast municipality of Osečina, to the east municipality of Valjevo, and to the south municipality of Bajina Bašta. The highest peak is Tornička Bobija 1272 meters high on the mountain Bobija. Several torrential rivers, flowing into the Drina river, intersect Azbukovica. The most famous rivers are Trešnjica and Ljuboviđa. In the late Ottoman period, the region was administratively part of the Sokol nahiya (Sokolska nahija).

== See also ==
- List of regions of Serbia

== Sources ==
- Pavle Vasić, ed. (1985). Azbukovica: zemlja, ljudi i život. Samoupravna interesna zajednica kulture opštine Ljubovija.
- Bulatović, A., V. Filipović, and R. Gligorić. "Loznica. Cultural Stratigraphy of the Prehistoric Sites in Jadar, Radjevina and Azbukovica." (2017).
- Mladenović, Milan S. Azbukovica u paklu rata 1914-1918: civilne žrtve. Biblioteka" Milovan Glišić", 2015.
- Živanović, Vedran. ПОЛОВИ РАСТА И РАЗВОЈА КАО ДЕТЕРМИНАНТЕ ПРОСТОРНО–ФУНКЦИОНАЛНЕ СТРУКТУРЕ РЕГИЈЕ ПОДРИЊЕ "The poles of growth and development as determinants of spatial and functional structure of Podrinje Region." Zbornik radova-Geografski fakultet Univerziteta u Beogradu 64 (2016): 221–254.
