= Vuk Crnogorac =

Vuk Crnogorac (Serbian Cyrillic: Вук Црногорац), also called Orle (Орле) and Oro (Оро; from orao (орао), "the Eagle"), was a legendary Serbian vojvoda (military commander) and the chieftain of Soko Grad, a medieval fortified town located in modern-day Gračanica, Ljubovija, western Serbia. He married the sister of vojvoda Damjan Tomković of Dukađin. Vuk had three children, including Pavle Orlović (1350–1389), a known figure in the Kosovo cycle of Serbian epic poetry. Vuk's descendants are known as Orlović. The Obrenović dynasty claimed descent from the Orlović through knez (prince) Martin of Bajica near Cetinje.
