= Sima Milutinović Sarajlija =

Serbian wrinter (1791–1847)

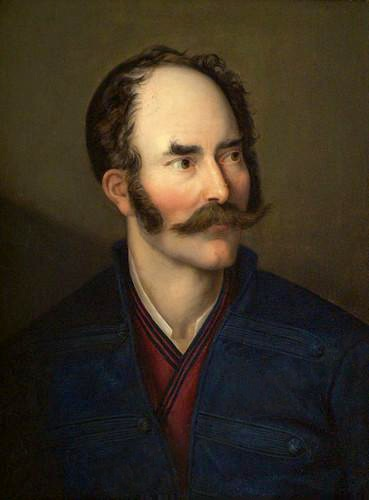
- Born: Simeon Milutinović; 3 October 1791; Sarajevo, Bosnia Eyalet, Ottoman Empire
- Died: 30 December 1847 (aged 56); Belgrade, Principality of Serbia, Ottoman Empire
- Occupations: Poet, hajduk, translator, historian, philologist, diplomat.
- Writing career
- Pen name: Simeun Milutinov, Simeun Mil. Simović, Simša M. Sirotan, Simo Milutinović, Čubro Čojkovič, Čubro Čojković-Crnogorac, Srbo Srbović, S. M. Crnogorac, Si. M. Saraj. Černogo. Herak, S. M. Simović, Č.Č.Č. Exauditus
- Movement: Romanticism

Simeon "Sima" Milutinović "Sarajlija" (Serbian Cyrillic: Симеон "Сима" Милутиновић "Сарајлија", pronounced [sǎːʋa milutǐːnɔʋit͡ɕ sarǎjlija]; 3 October 1791 – 30 December 1847) was a poet, hajduk, translator, historian and adventurer. Literary critic Jovan Skerlić dubbed him the first Serbian romantist.

== Life and work ==
Sima Milutinović was born in Sarajevo, Ottoman Empire in 1791, hence his nickname Sarajlija (The Sarajevan). His father Milutin was from the village of Rožanstvo near Užice, which he left running away from the plague and eventually settled in Sarajevo, where he was married.

When Sarajlija was a child, the family fled the town because of a plague. They sought refuge at several locations in Bosnia and Slavonski Brod before ending up in Zemun, where Sima commenced primary education which he never completed. He attended a school in Szeged and was later expelled from gymnasium in Sremski Karlovci.

During the First Serbian Uprising he was a scribe in Karađorđe's Governing Council (Praviteljstvujušći Sovjet). Sarajlija joined a guerilla group commanded by hajduk Zeka Buljubaša. It was in the heat of battles with Ottoman Turks that his first poems germinated. They were mostly lovesongs, inspired by his first great love - Fatima. After the collapse of the First Serbian Uprising he was a hajduk and teacher in Vidin. He also spent a year or two in a Turkish dungeon. After evading the Turks, he went to Chişinău (then part of Imperial Russia), where he remained, long enough to write The Serbian Maid. It is said that he sent reports to confidants of Miloš Obrenović I, Prince of Serbia concerning Karađorđe's followers in exile. In 1825 he went to Germany where he enrolled in the University of Leipzig, though he did not tarry there. Instead, a year later, he went back to Serbia to be a clerk in the employ of Prince Miloš but on arriving in Zemun, however, he turned about and went to Trieste, Kotor, and then Cetinje.

He arrived in Cetinje on 25 September 1827, and the Bishop of Montenegro took him in as a secretary. He also went among the tribes to dispense justice and settle disputes and took upon himself the education of Bishop's nephew Rade (Petar II Petrović-Njegoš). In 1829 Bjelice tribe struggled against Ozrinići and Kuće, two neighboring tribes, and his former pupil Petar II Petrović-Njegoš sent Sarajlija and Mojsije to negotiate peace among them. Sarajlija remained in Cetinje for more than three years, until the spring of 1831. He came to Montenegro for another three times.

In 1836, he escorted Prince Miloš to Constantinople and went on to travel to Prague, Vienna and Budapest. He remained a while in Budapest and married Marija Popović-Punktatorka (1810–1875), who was also a poet.

He died suddenly in Belgrade at the end of 1847. He was buried in the graveyard at St. Mark's Church.

== Selected works ==
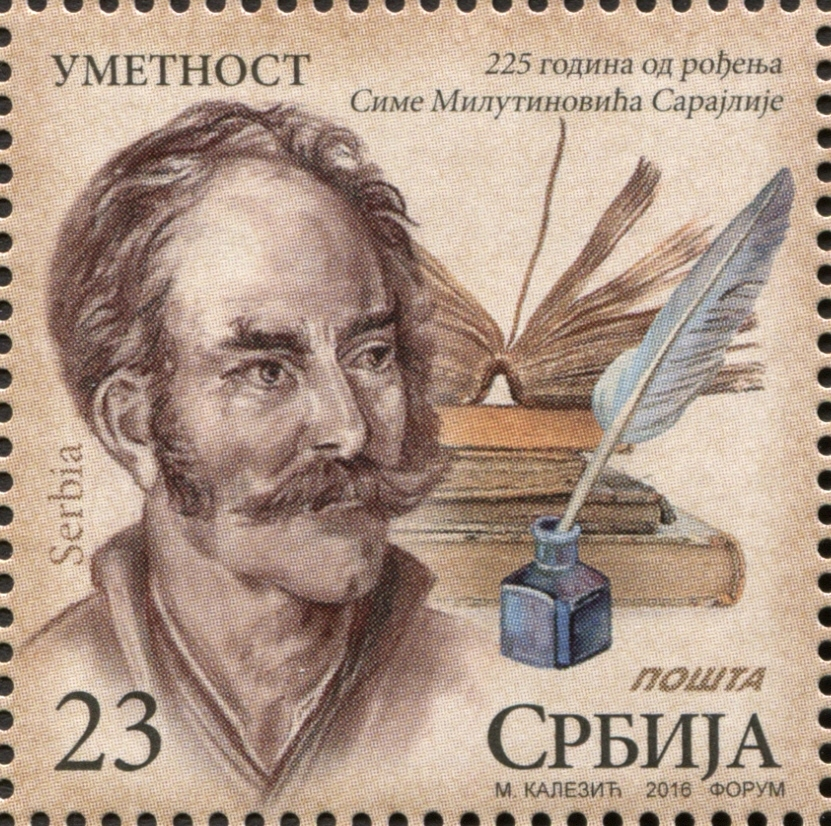
Sarajlija on a 2016 stamp of Serbia

- Serbijanka, epic poem
- Nekolike pjesnice, stare, nove, prevedene i sočinjene Simom Milutinovićem Sarajlijom, book of poems
- Zorica, book of poems
- Tragedija Obilić, epic poem about Miloš Obilić
- Raspjevke Talfiji, book of poems
- Dika crnogorska, drama
- Istorija Crne Gore: History of Montenegro
- Pjevanija crnogorska i hercegovačka, collection of Serbian epic poetry from Montenegro and Herzegovina
- Tragedija vožda Karađorđa, epic poem about Leader Karađorđe
- Collected works published in 6 volumes

== See also ==
- Serbian art
