= Ozrinići (tribe) =

Historical tribe and region in Montenegro

Ozrinići (Serbian Cyrillic: Озринићи) is a historical tribe (pleme) and region in Montenegro. During the Ottoman period, it was one of the largest tribe of the Katunska nahija, one of the four territorial units of Old Montenegro.

== History ==
The first reference to the Ozrinići comes from a letter issued by the Serbian Chancellery in Dubrovnik in 1411. The document, a complaint from Ragusan people addressed to Jelena Balšić, is about the looting committed by the Ozrinići, together with the Bjelopavlići, Maznice and Malonšići, on Ragusan merchants on their way through Zeta while they were returning from Serbia.

The Ozrinići are mentioned again in the 1489 charter of Ivan Crnojević, then in the 1570–1571 defter of the Sandjak of Peć. Five families of the Ozrinići founded the settlement of Ozrinići in the Nikšić area in 1597.

During the Ottoman period, from the 16th up to the end of the 18th century, the Ozrinići were the largest tribe of the Katunska nahija, one of the four territorial units of Old Montenegro.

Old Montenegrin tribes, Ozrinići is no. 6.

In 1829, the Ozrinići and Cuce had an armed conflict against neighboring Bjelice. Petar I Petrović-Njegoš sent Sima Milutinović Sarajlija and Mojsije to negotiate peace among them.

== Anthropology ==
According to Kovijanić, the Ozrinići were an old Serb tribe. Their founder was Ozro, who moved from Zeta and his descendants formed the Ozrinići tribe. Ozrinići included the villages of Barjamovica, Velestovo, Markovina, Maklen, Čevo, Ploča, Lastva, Ožegovići. Most Ozrinići celebrate the slava (feast) of Aranđelovdan (Michael).

== Sources ==
- Nebojša B. Drašković (1999). Čevsko Zaljuće i Donji Kraj sela u plemenu Ozrinići. Odbor za proučavanje sela SANU, kulturno-prosvetna zajednica Republike Srbije.
- Petar Pejović; Mihailo Burić; Novak Ražnatović; Drago Ćupić (2004). Ozrinići: pleme stare Crne Gore. P. Pejović. ISBN 978-86-905597-0-1.
- Kovijanić, Risto (1974). Crnogorska plemena u kotorskim spomenicima (XIV–XVI vijek) [Montenegrin tribes in Bay of Kotor records (XIV–XVI century)]. Titograd: Istorijski institut SR Crne Gore.
