= Aleksandar Mišić =

Serbian military commander and Chetnik officer (1891–1941)

Major Aleksandar Mišić
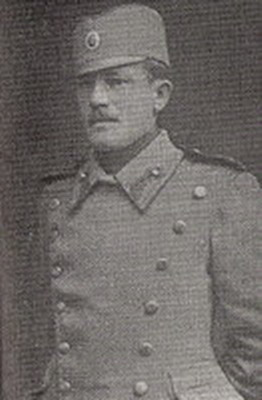
- Mišić in Royal Yugoslav Army uniform
- Born: Aleksandar Mišić; 17 June 1891; Belgrade, Kingdom of Serbia
- Died: 17 December 1941 (aged 50); Valjevo, Nazi-occupied territory of Serbia
- Burial place: Unknown
- Relatives: Živojin Mišić (father)
- Military career
- Allegiance: Kingdom of Serbia; Kingdom of Yugoslavia; Chetniks
- Branch: Army
- Service years: 1912–1922; 1941
- Rank: Major
- Nickname: Aca
- Conflicts: First Balkan War; Second Balkan War; World War I in Serbia; World War II in Yugoslavia (executed)
- Awards: Order of the Star of Karadjordje

Aleksandar "Aca" Mišić (Serbian Cyrillic: Александар Аца Мишић; 17 June 1891 – 17 December 1941) was a Royal Serbian Army officer in World War I and a Chetnik in World War II.

During World War II, Mišić was complicit in handover of 365 captured Yugoslav Partisans to the Germans. Mišić was captured during Operation Mihailovic by the Germans and executed on 17 December 1941. In December 2016, Serbian pro-Chetnik publicist Miloslav Samardžić of Pogledi published an article stating that Mišić may have actually died in 1944 and not in 1941.

== External sources ==
- Tomasevich, Jozo (1975). War and Revolution in Yugoslavia, 1941–1945: The Chetniks. Stanford: Stanford University Press. ISBN 978-0-8047-0857-9.
- Kumm, Otto (1978). Vorwärts, Prinz Eugen!: Geschichte d. 7. SS-Freiwilligen-Division "Prinz Eugen". Munin. ISBN 978-3-921242-34-6.
- Milovanović, Nikola (1991). Draža Mihailović. Belgrade: Pegaz.
