= Struganik =

Coordinates: 44°11′N 20°6′E

- Village (Selo)
- Interactive map of Struganik
- Country: Serbia
- District: Kolubara District
- Municipality: Mionica
- Time zone: UTC+1 (CET)
  - Summer (DST): UTC+2 (CEST)

Struganik is a village situated in Mionica municipality in Serbia and the birthplace of Field Marshal Živojin Mišić.

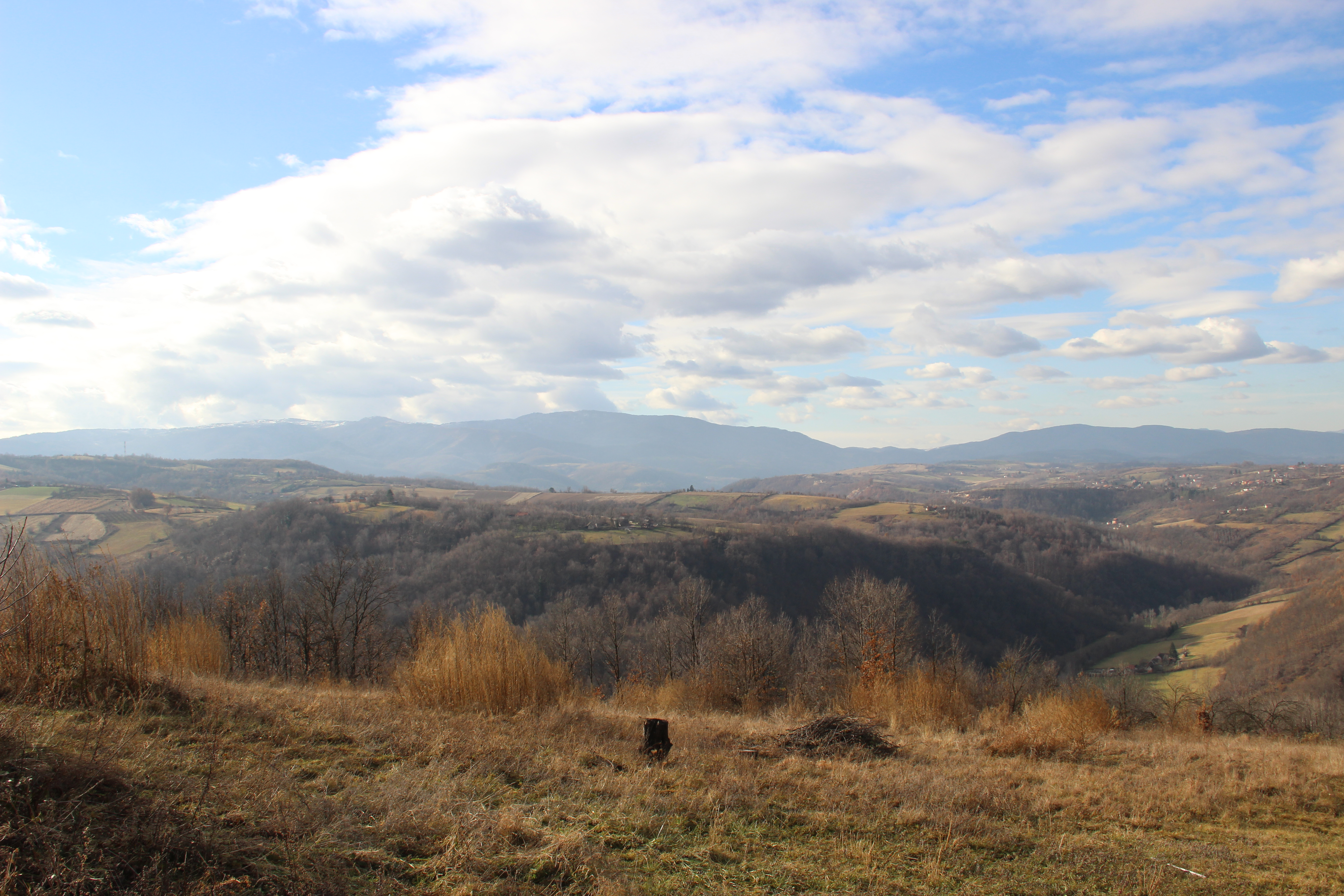
Struganik - panorama

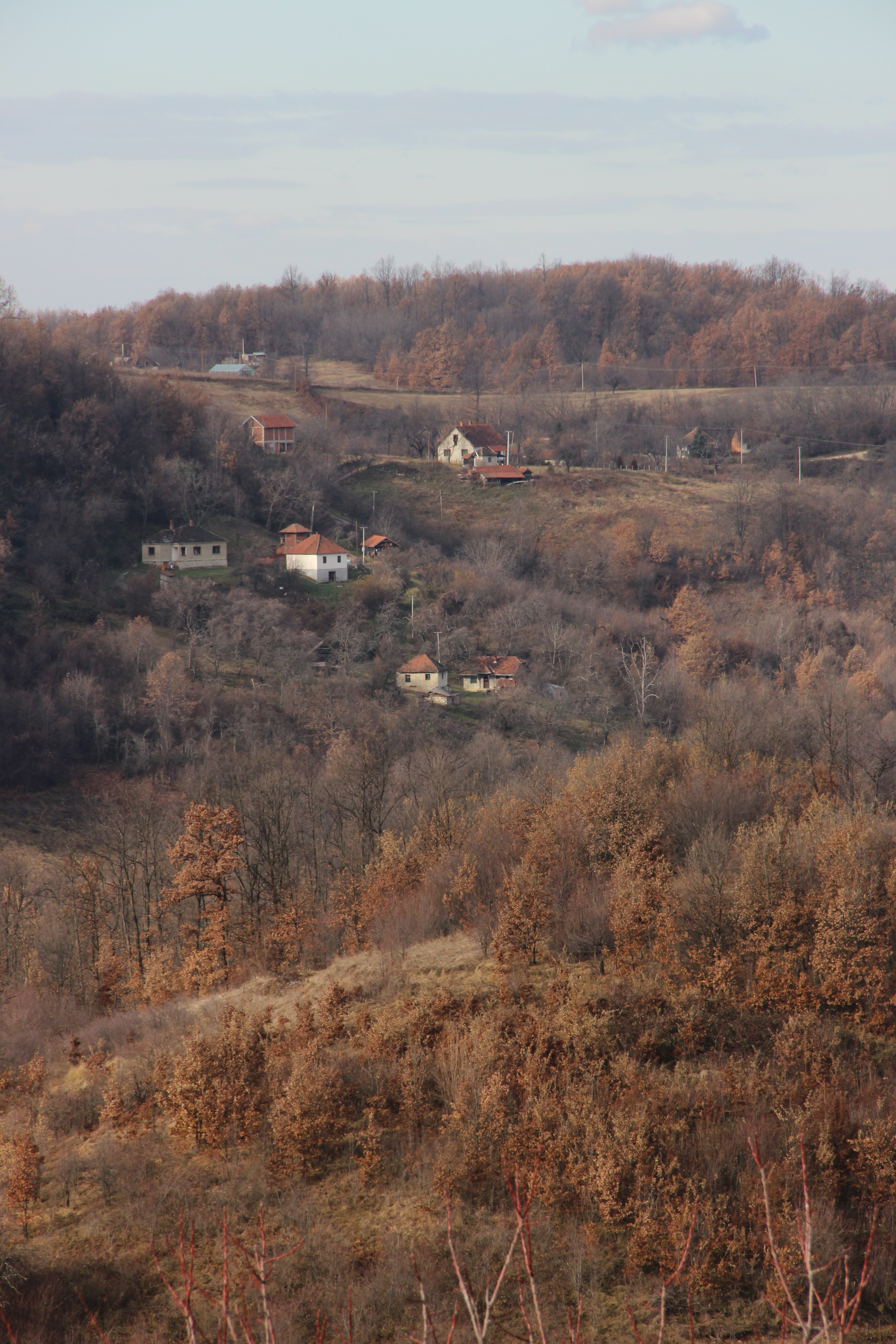
Struganik - panorama

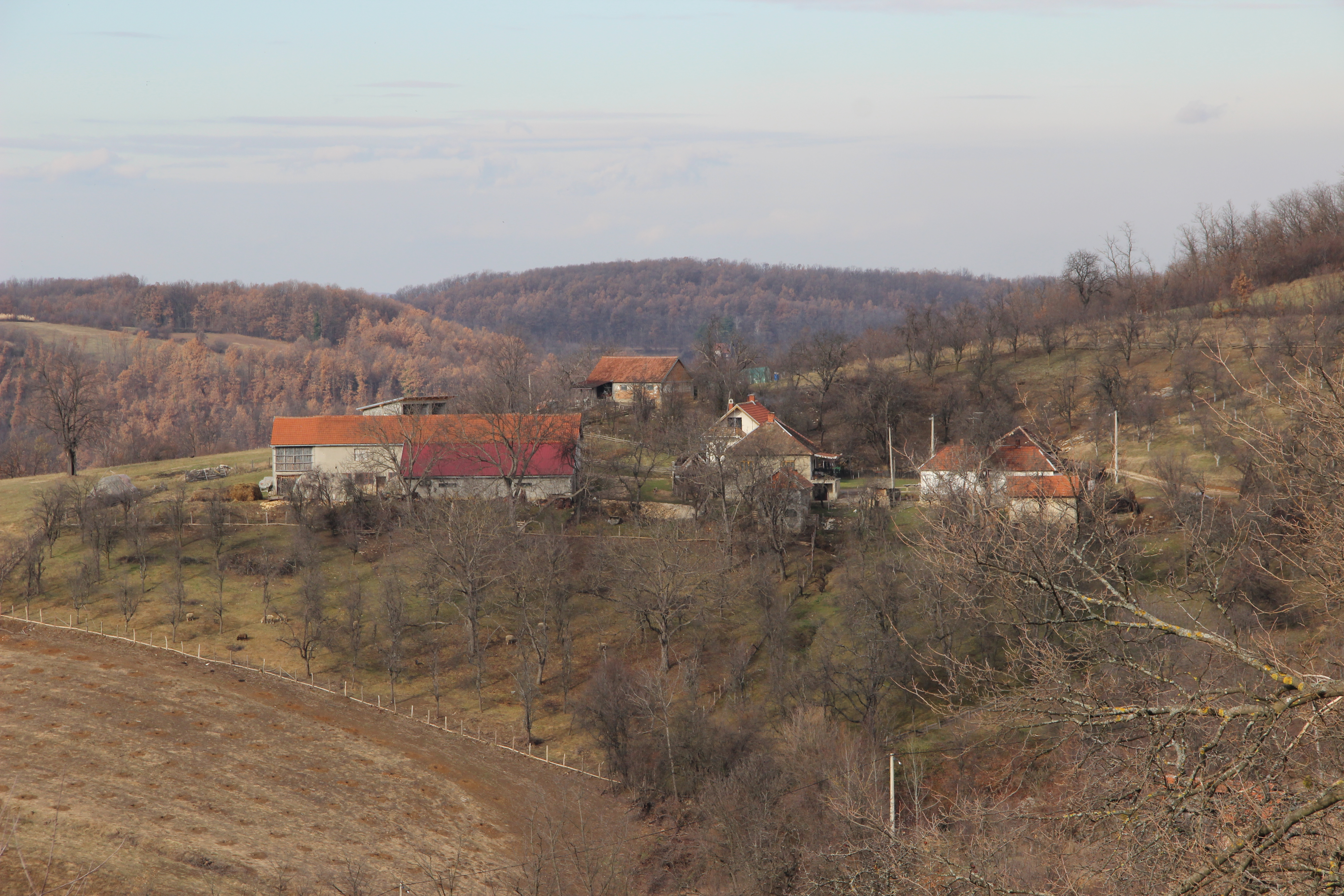
Struganik - panorama

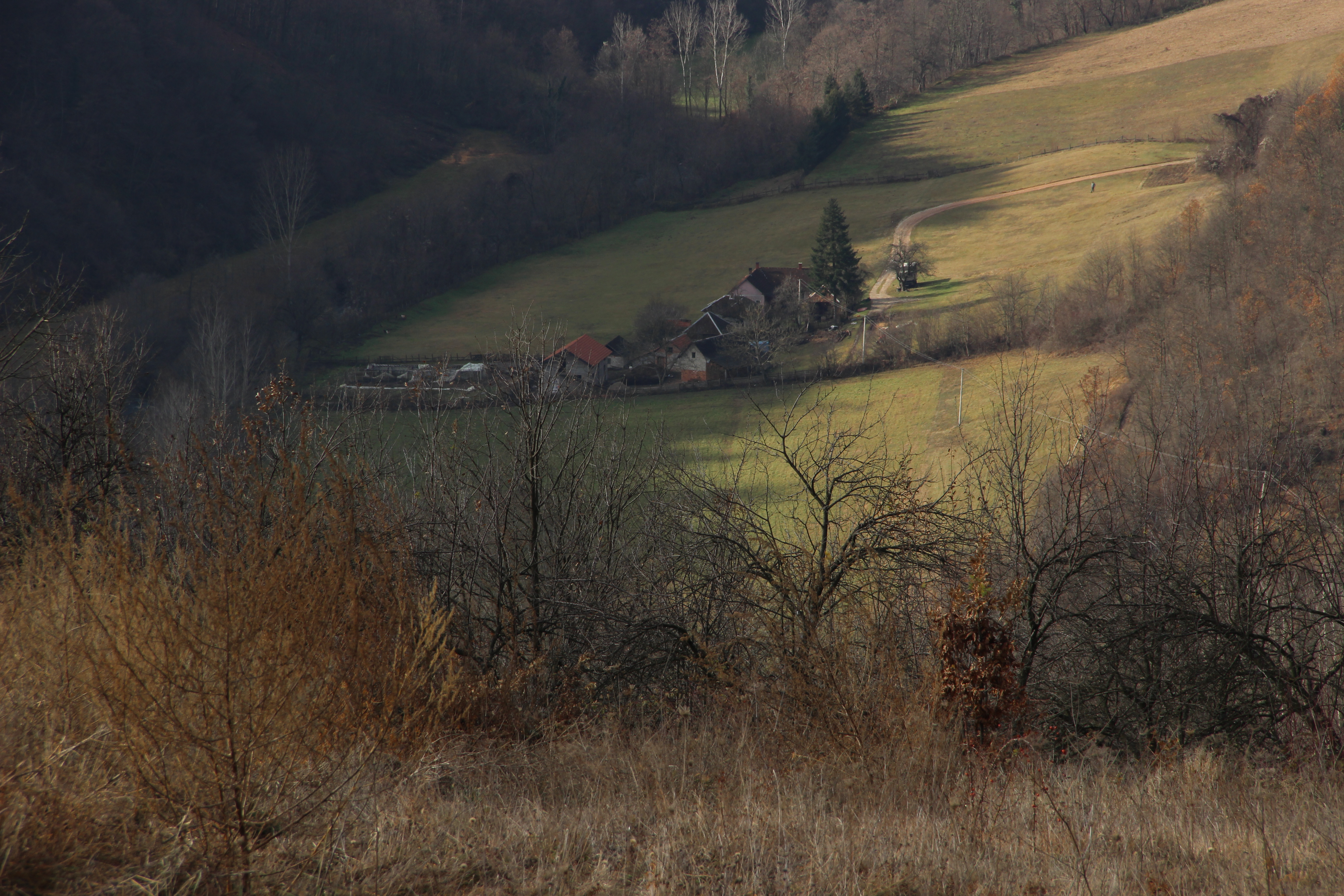
Struganik - panorama

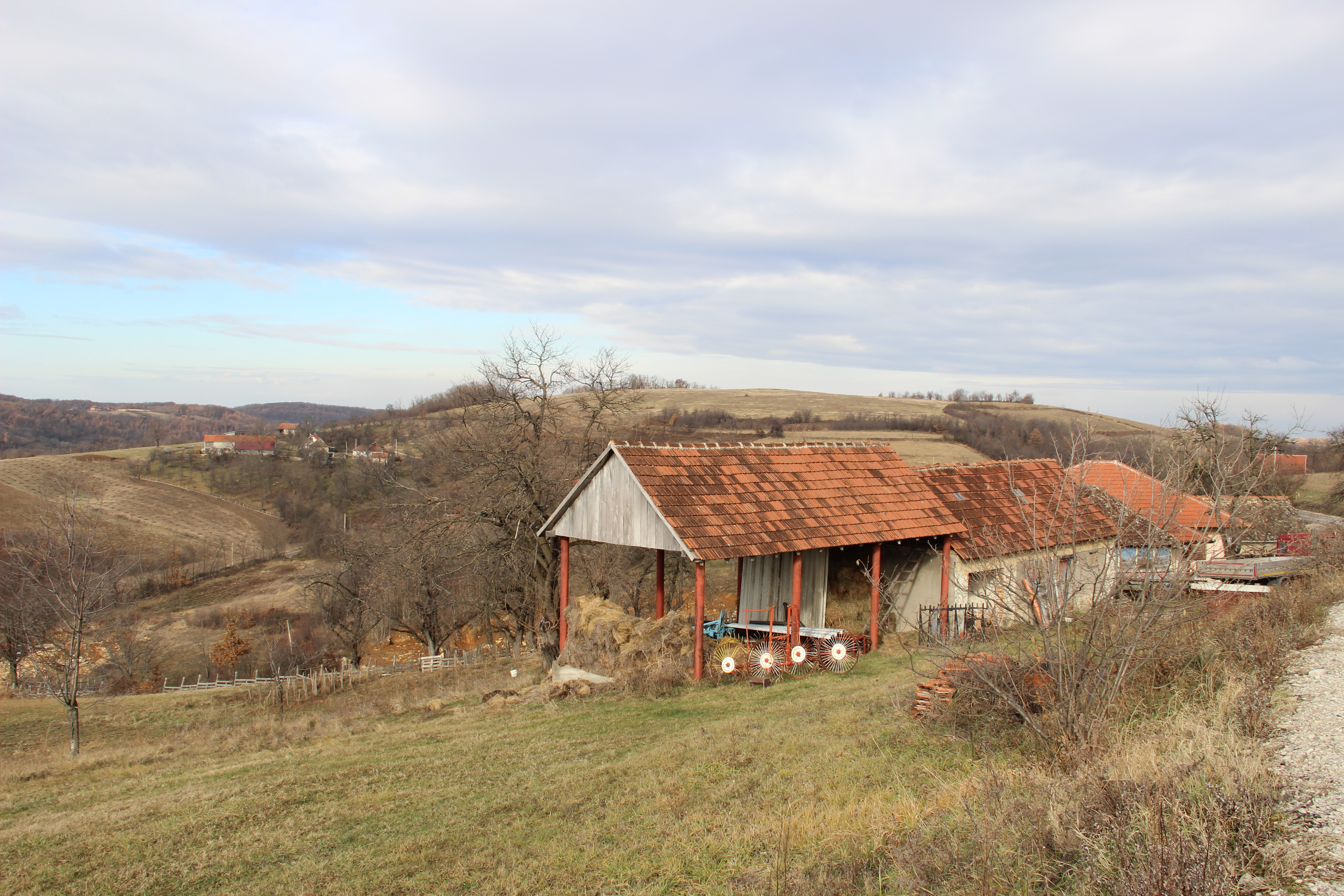
Struganik - panorama

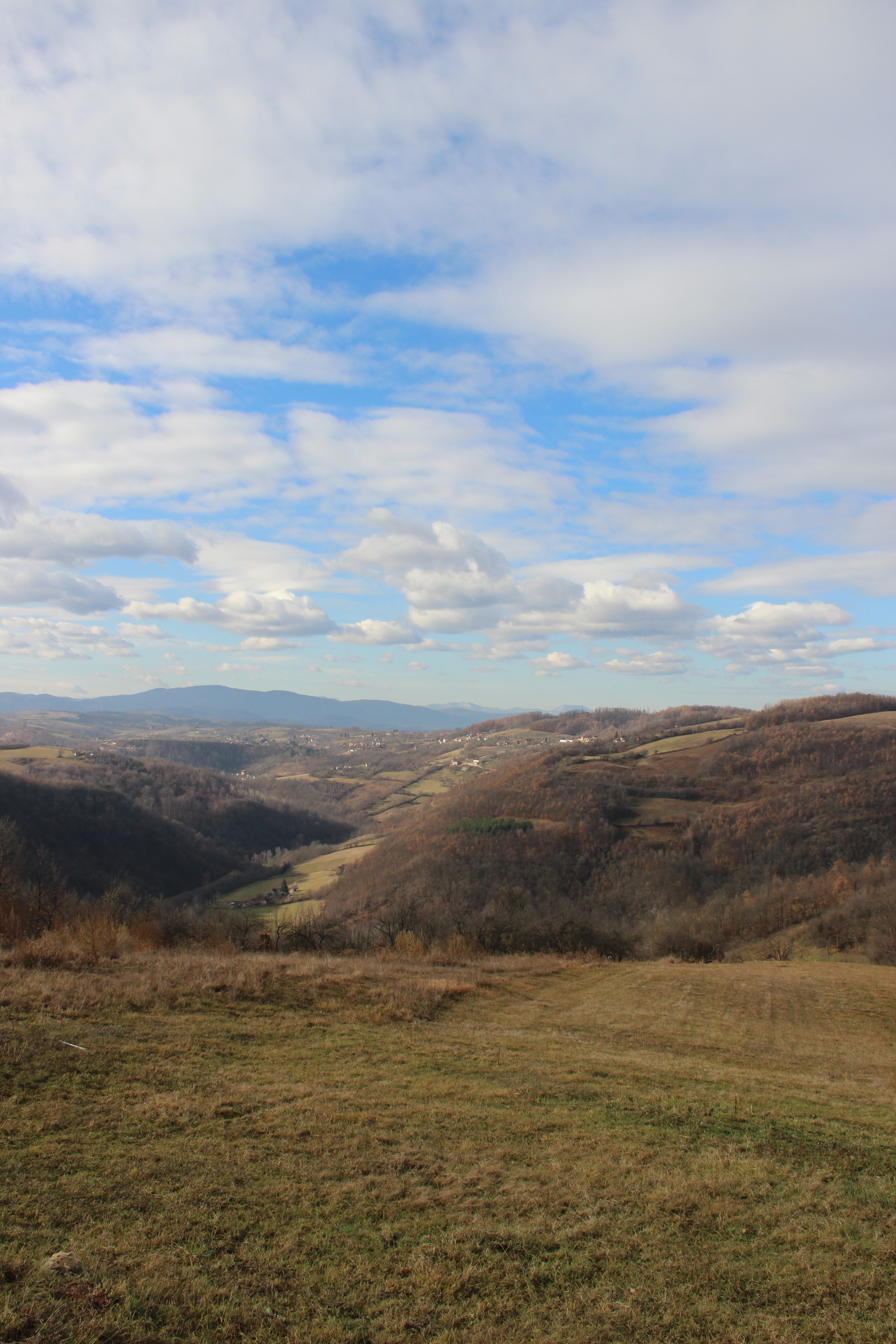
Struganik - panorama

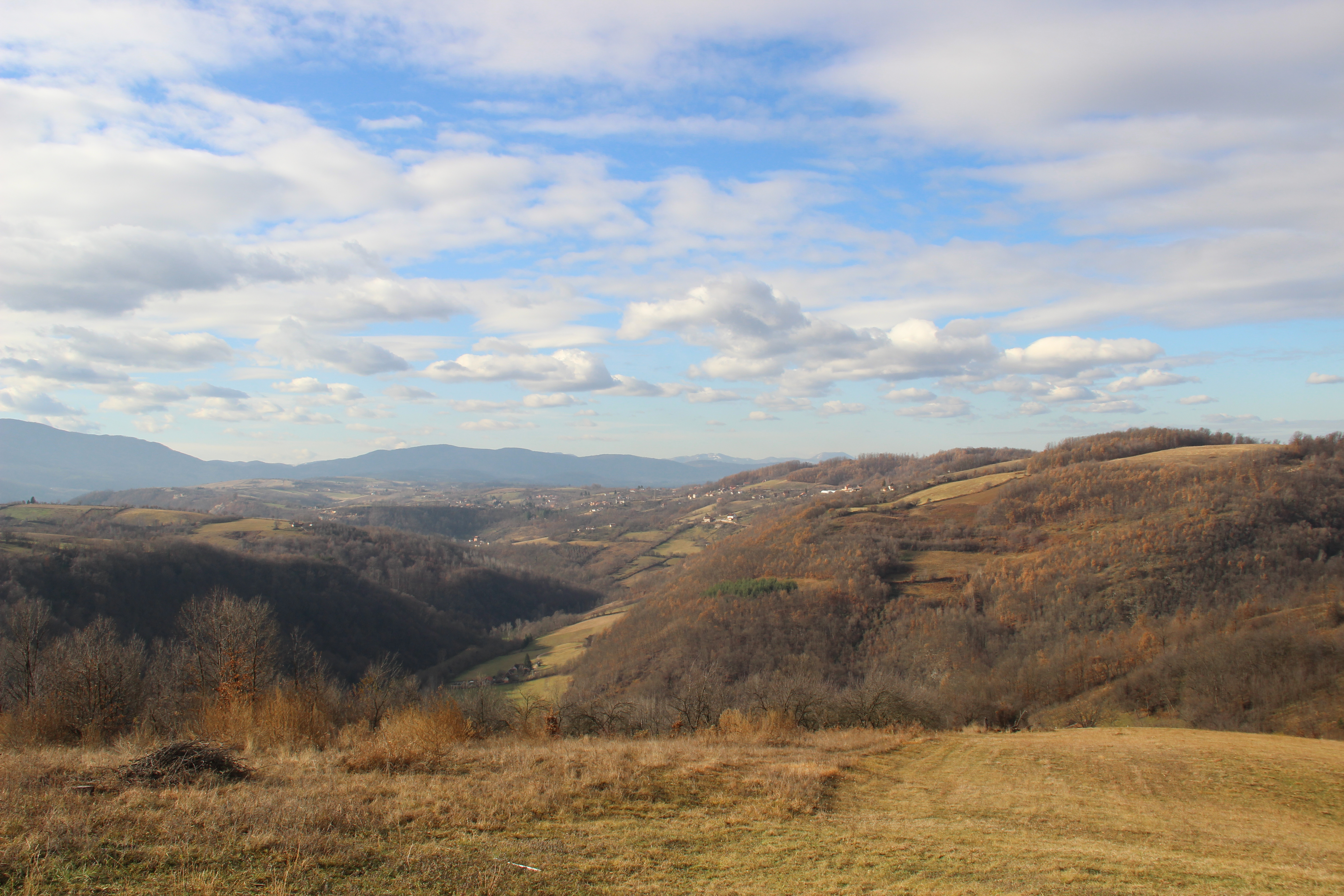
Struganik - panorama

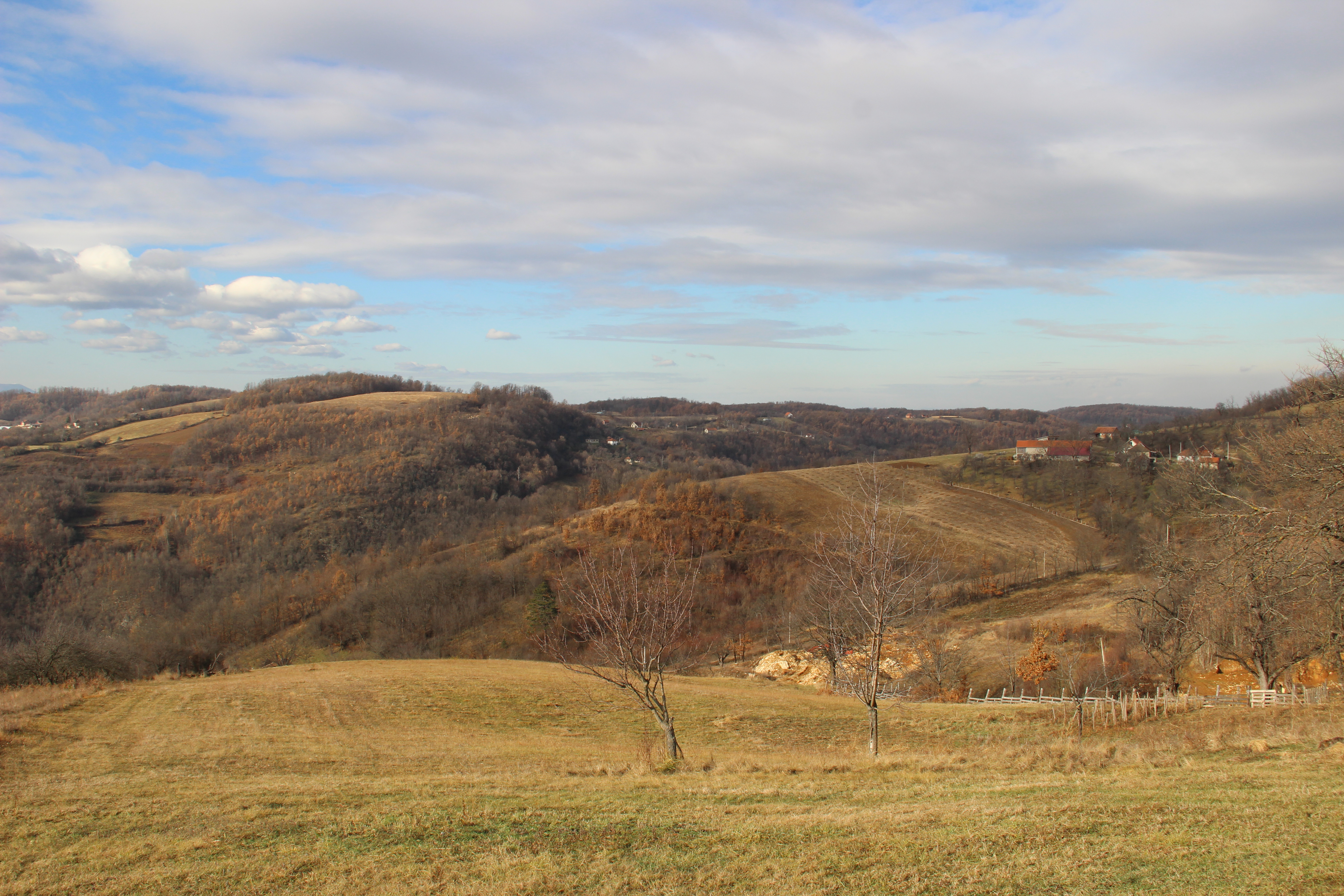
Struganik - panorama

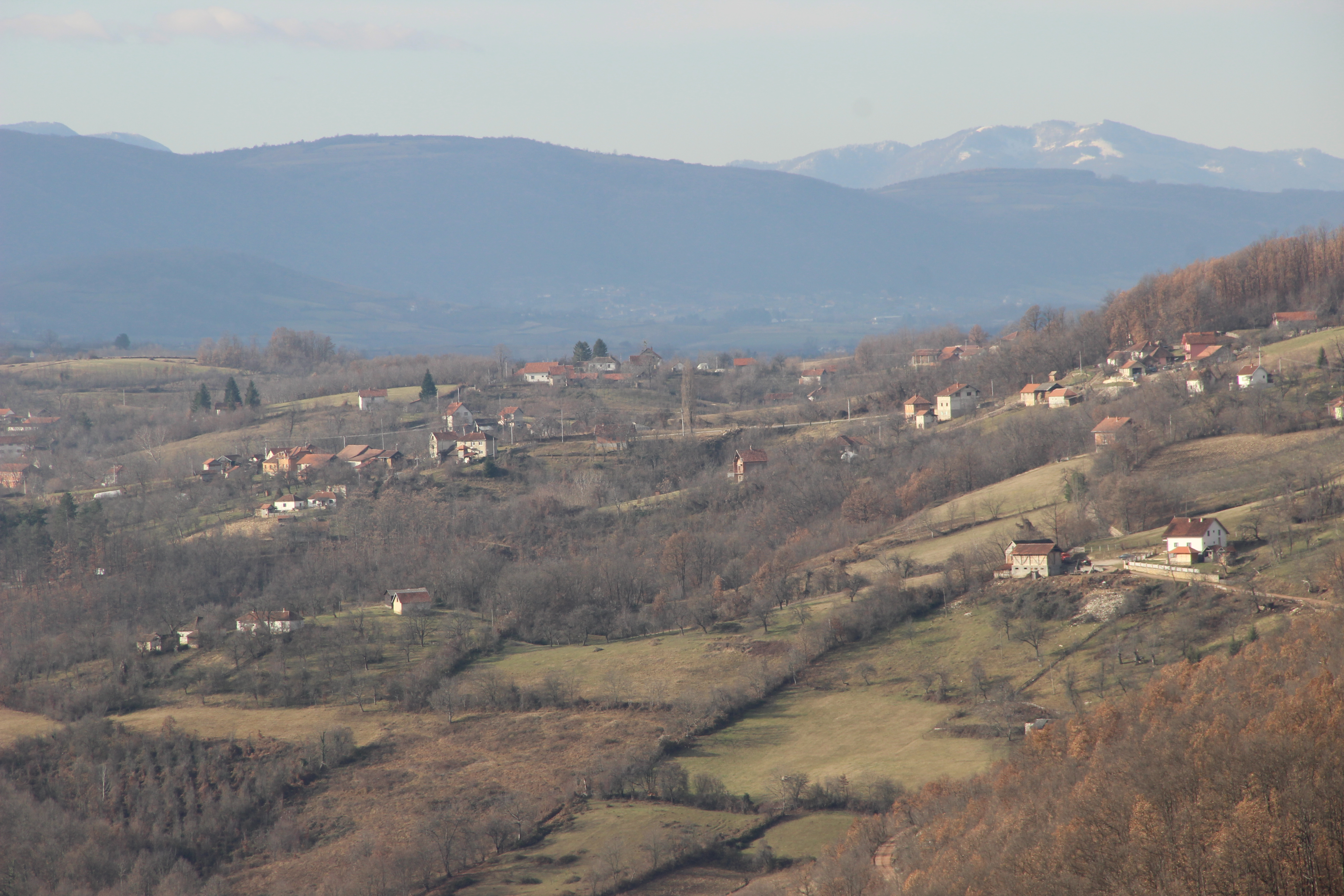
Struganik - panorama

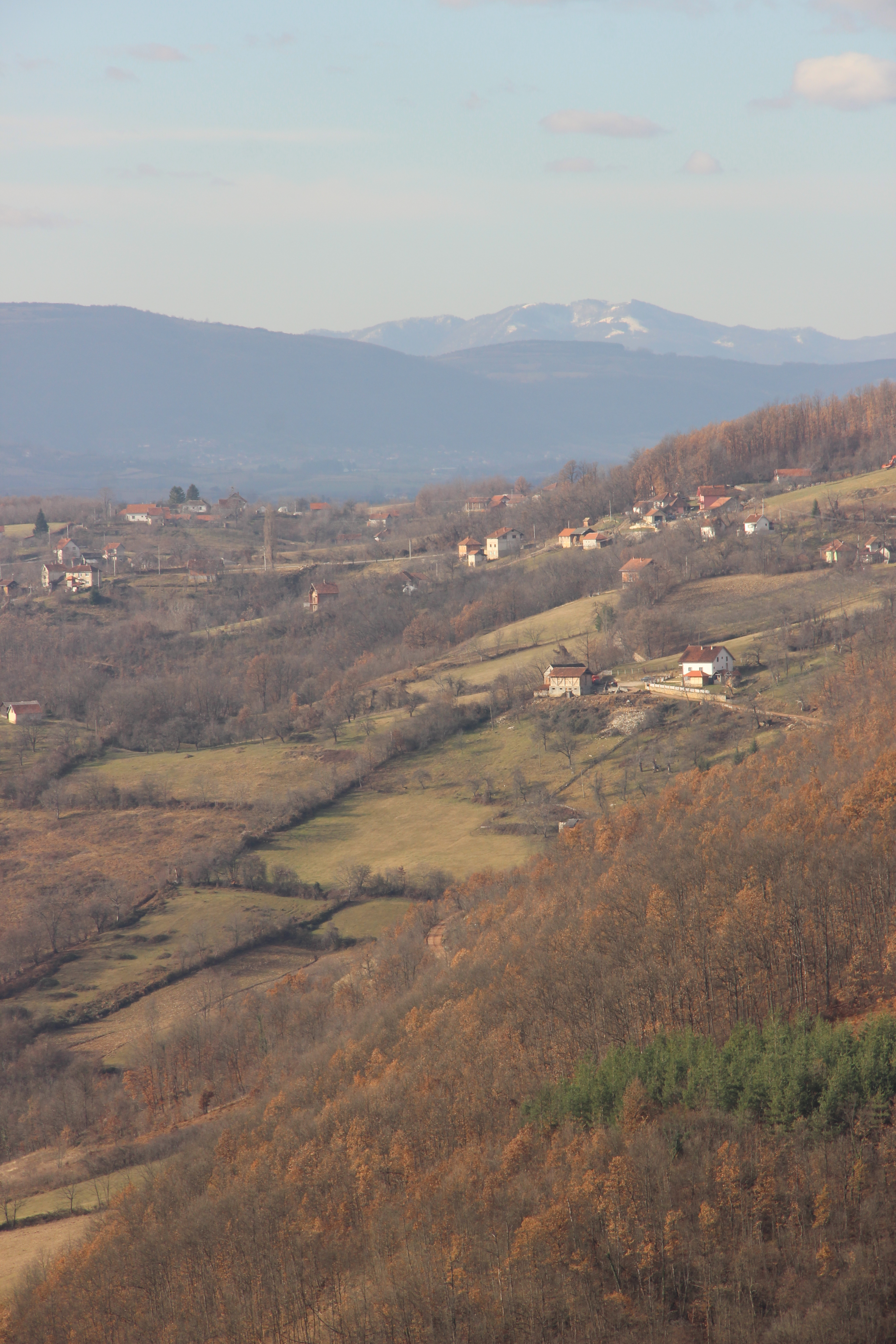
Struganik - panorama
