= Jablanica, Gornji Milanovac =

Jablanica Јабланица
- Village
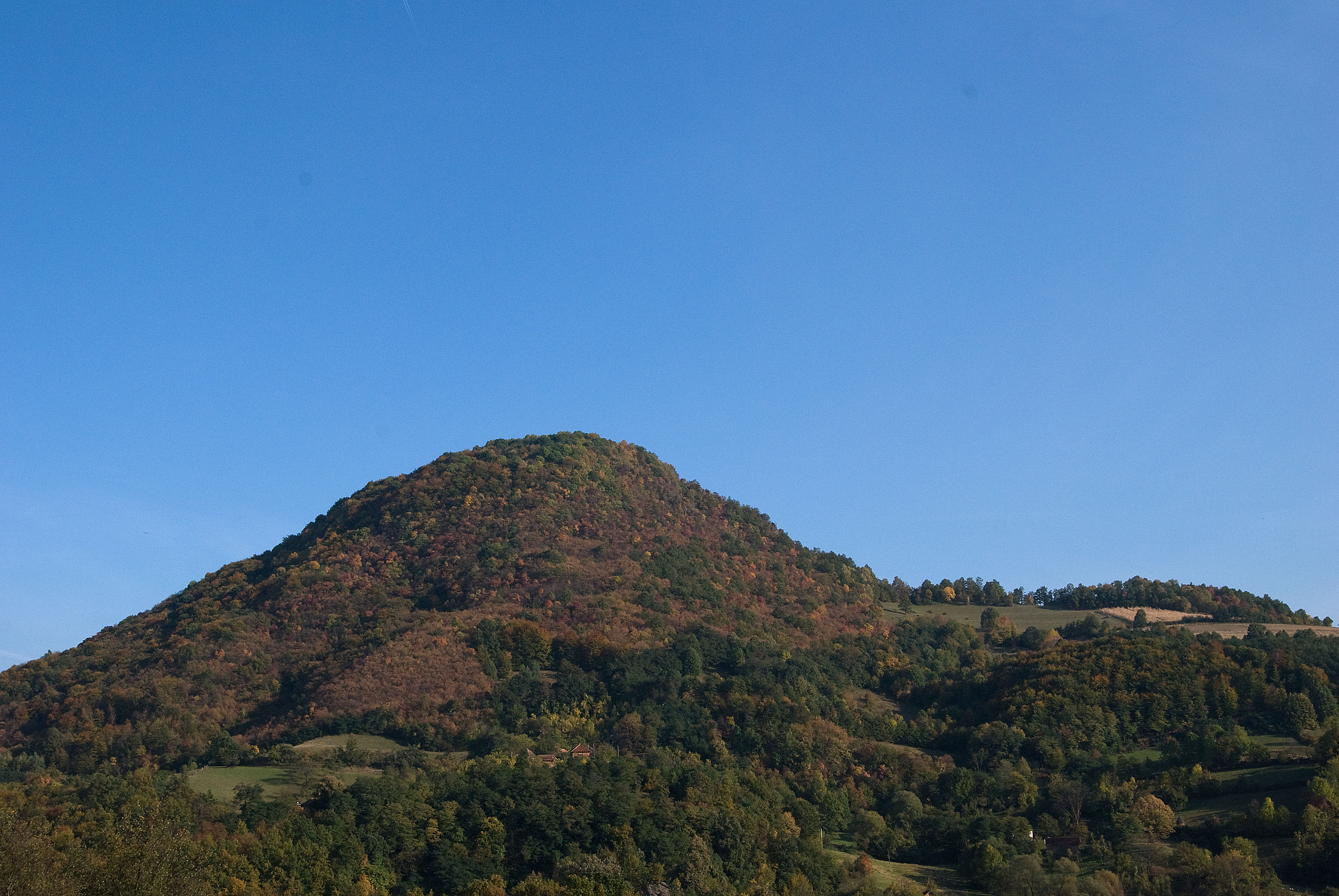
- RNK 1001 Treska

- Location within Serbia
- Coordinates: 43°59′N 20°30′E
- Country: Serbia
- District: Moravica District
- Municipality: Gornji Milanovac

Population (2002)
  - Total: 331
- Time zone: UTC+1 (CET)
  - Summer (DST): UTC+2 (CEST)

Jablanica is a village in the municipality of Gornji Milanovac, Serbia. According to the 2002 census, the village then had a population of 331 people.
