= Kosovo Maiden =

Figure in Serbian epic poetry

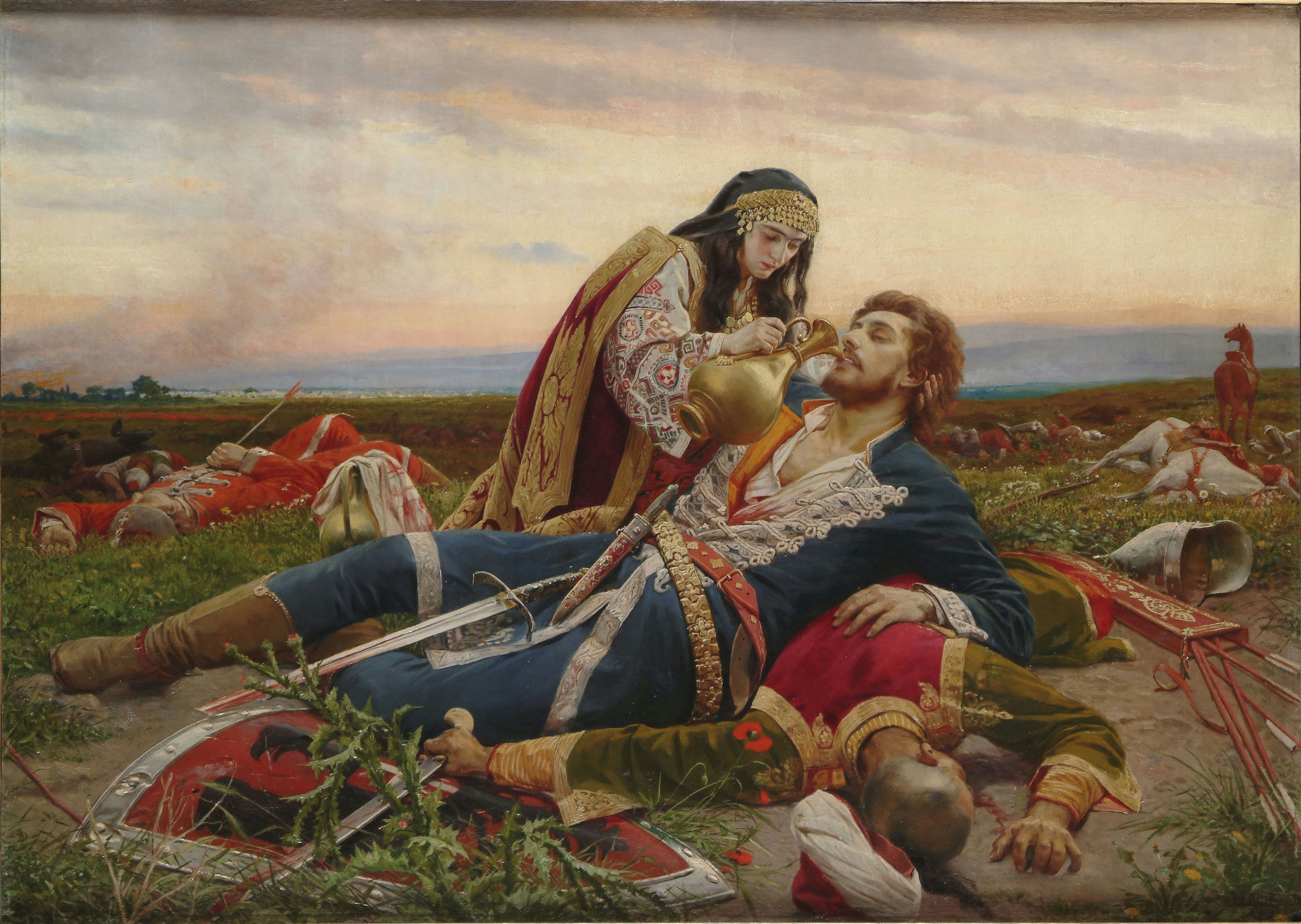
Uroš Predić's 1919 painting Kosovo Maiden

The Kosovo Maiden or Maiden of the Blackbird's Field (Serbian: Косовка девојка / Kosovka devojka) is the central figure of a poem with the same name, part of the Kosovo cycle in the Serbian epic poetry. In it, a young beauty searches the battlefield for her betrothed fiancé and helps wounded Serbian warriors with water, wine and bread after the Battle of Kosovo in 1389 between Serbia and the Ottoman Empire. She finally finds the wounded and dying warrior Pavle Orlović who tells her that her fiancé Milan Toplica and his blood-brothers Miloš Obilić and Ivan Kosančić are dead. Before the battle they had given her a cloak, golden ring and veil for the wedding as a promise of safe return, but they were slain and Pavle pointed to the direction of the bodies. The poem finishes with:

"O wretch! Evil is your fortune!
If I, a wretch, were to grasp a green pine,
Even the green pine would wither."

The poem became very popular as a symbol of womanly compassion and charity.

== Identification ==
According to folklore, the Maiden was Jelica — the sister of Stefan Musić. Musić was known as an arrogant lord who ruled the town of Brvenik. Jelica was also purportedly the cousin of Tsar Lazar, the holy martyr who also died in the Battle of Kosovo.

== In art ==
In 1879, the Kosovo Maiden was first painted by Ferdo Kikerec, when historical themes were in vogue at the time — to raise patriotic fervor. Forty years later in 1919 the painting became an inspiration to Uroš Predić, who painted one of the most famous oil paintings of Serbian fine art as part of the cycle of the Carriage of Serbian Sisters. The model for the character of the maiden was Leposava Stanković, later Lulik (1899—1995).

In 1909, Ivan Meštrović created a marble relief as part of the sculptural decoration for the Vidovdan Temple, which was supposed to be built in Kosovo. The sculpture is characterized by solid and stable forms, which seem monumental, clearly associating metopes (i.e. fields decorated with reliefs on ancient temples.) Meštrović's Kosovka devojka depicts a girl and a hero, who, as if in a trance, observe the site of the most difficult battle and illustrates ten lines of Pavle Orlović from the folk song of the same name:

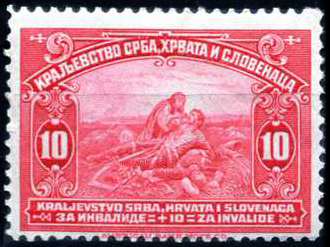
Yugoslav stamp, 1921

"Dear sister, Kosovo Maiden!

You see, honey, that spear battalion

is the highest and the thickest,

There the blood of the hero fell

to the stirrup of the good horse,

To the stirrup and to the bridle,

And the hero to the silken dogs,

There all three of you died,

You go to the white court already,

Don't bleed curds or sleeves."

Another Croatian artist, painter Mirko Rački, painted a version of the Kosovo Maiden.

== In popular culture ==
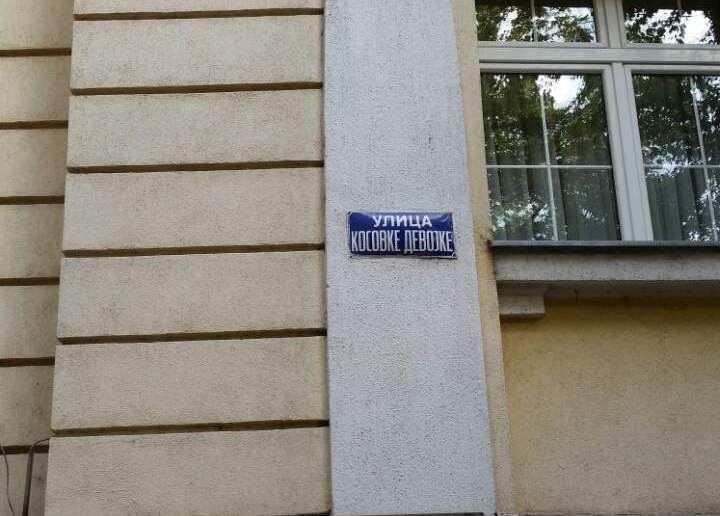
Kosovo Maiden Street in Stari Grad, Belgrade

The character of the Kosovo Maiden appears in the 1989 film Battle of Kosovo.

Streets named after the Kosovo Maiden are located in Stari Grad, Belgrade, as well as in Niš, Mladenovac, Surčin and Banja Luka.

== See also ==
- Mother Serbia
- National personification
