= Koštunići =

- Village
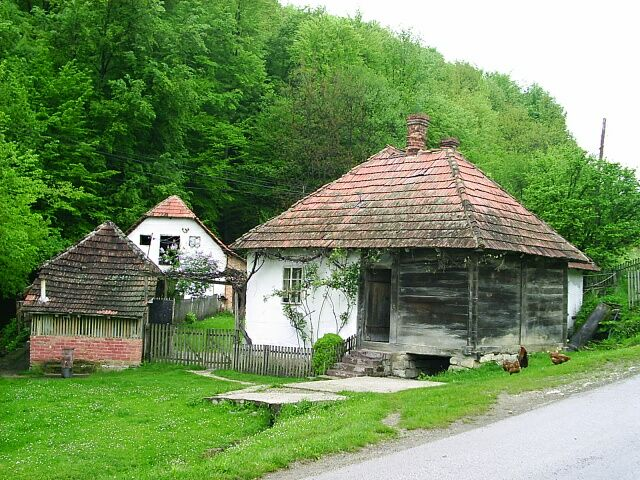

- Location within Serbia
- Coordinates: 44°03′54″N 20°10′47″E
- Country: Serbia
- District: Moravica District
- Municipality: Gornji Milanovac

Area
  - Total: 47.37 km^{2} (18.29 sq mi)
- Elevation: 519 m (1,703 ft)

Population (2011)
  - Total: 544
  - Density: 11.5/km^{2} (29.7/sq mi)
- Time zone: UTC+1 (CET)
  - Summer (DST): UTC+2 (CEST)

Koštunići is a village in the municipality of Gornji Milanovac, Serbia. According to the 2011 census, the village has a population of 544 people.

The village was active in the Serbian Revolution, being organized into the knežina (administrative unit) of Brusnica (Takovo) during the First Serbian Uprising (1804–13). The revolutionary Jovan Damljanović came from the village.
