= Bjelica =

Origin
- Language: Serbian
- Region of origin: Bjelice

Bjelica is a Serbian and Montenegrin surname, mostly found in Serbia, Montenegro and Bosnia and Herzegovina, and to a lesser extent in Croatia. The surname is derived from the historical clan region of Bjelice, in Old Montenegro. Émigrés from Bjelice, in order to preserve their origin, adopted the tribal name as surname instead of their own original family or brotherhood (srb. bratstvo) surname; this took place in the 18th and 19th centuries. The vast majority of bearers of the surname are Eastern Orthodox (Serbian Orthodox Church) and declare as ethnic Serbs and Montenegrins, although there are some Muslims (Bosniaks) and Catholics (Croats) with the surname. Most of the Orthodox maintain the tradition of slava (patron saint veneration) of St. John the Baptist (Jovanjdan) - other slavas are present as well (such as St Paraskevi, i.e. St Petka).

== People ==
- Aleksandar Bjelica (born 1994), Serbian footballer
- Ana Bjelica (born 1992), Serbian volleyball player
- Dimitrije Bjelica (1935–2025), Serbian chess FIDE Master and journalist
- Isidora Bjelica (1967–2020), Bosnian-born Serbian prose writer
- Milan Bjelica (born 1956), Deputy Chief of Serbian General Staff of the Serbian Armed Forces
- Milka Bjelica (born 1981), Serbian-born Montenegrin basketball player
- Milko Bjelica (born 1984), Serbian-born Montenegrin basketball player
- Nemanja Bjelica (born 1988), Serbian basketball player
- Nenad Bjelica (born 1971), Croatian football manager and former player
- Novica Bjelica (born 1983), Serbian volleyball player
