= Samardžić =

Samardžić (Serbian Cyrillic: Самарџић) is a Serbian and Bosniak occupational surname derived from samardžija, a Turkism meaning "saddle maker". It is also believed that the first family of Samardžić originated from the Orlović Clan through a descendant Salvo Orlović, who established the Samardžić Clan in Krivošije in the late 1300s. Later on, many of the families moved west as far as Sinj, Knin, Velika Kladuša, and Cazin (particularly in Bosanska Krajina). It may refer to:

- Aleksandra Samardžić (born 1997), Bosnian judoka
- Dejan Samardzic, member of Haujobb
- Lazar Samardžić (born 2002), German-Serbian footballer
- Ljubiša Samardžić (1936–2017), Serbian actor and director
- Jasmin Samardžić (born 1974), Croatian footballer
- Marko Samardžić (born 1983), Serbian volleyball player
- Matea Samardžić (born 1995), Croatian swimmer
- Miral Samardžić (born 1987), Slovenian footballer
- Miloslav Samardžić (born 1963), Serbian writer
- Radomir Samardžić (born 1978), Serbian taekwondo athlete
- Radoslav Samardžić (born 1970), retired Serbian footballer
- Radovan Samardžić (1922–1994), Serbian historian
- Slobodan Samardžić (born 1953), Serbian academic and politician
- Snežana Samardžić-Marković (born 1966), Serbian politician
- Spasoje "Paja" Samardžić (born 1942), retired Serbian footballer
- Tin Samardžić (born 1979), Croatian pop singer
- Željko Samardžić (born 1955), Herzegovinian-Serbian singer
