= Ozrinići =

Ozrinići Озринићи
- Village
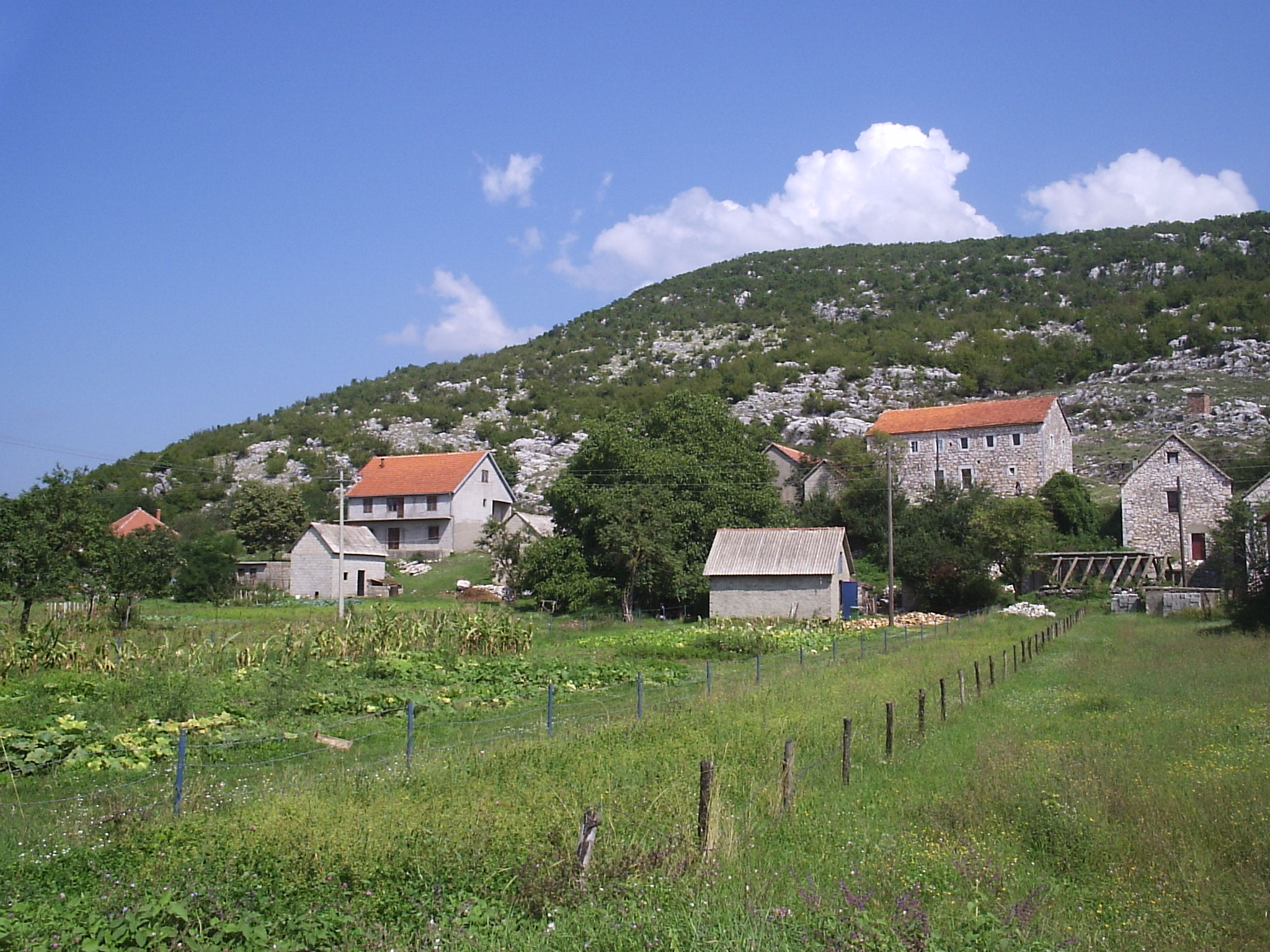
- Ozrinići in 2005

- Location within Montenegro
- Country: Montenegro
- Municipality: Nikšić

Population (2011)
  - Total: 2,057
- Time zone: UTC+1 (CET)
  - Summer (DST): UTC+2 (CEST)

Ozrinići (Cyrillic: Озринићи) is a village in the municipality of Nikšić, Montenegro.

== History ==
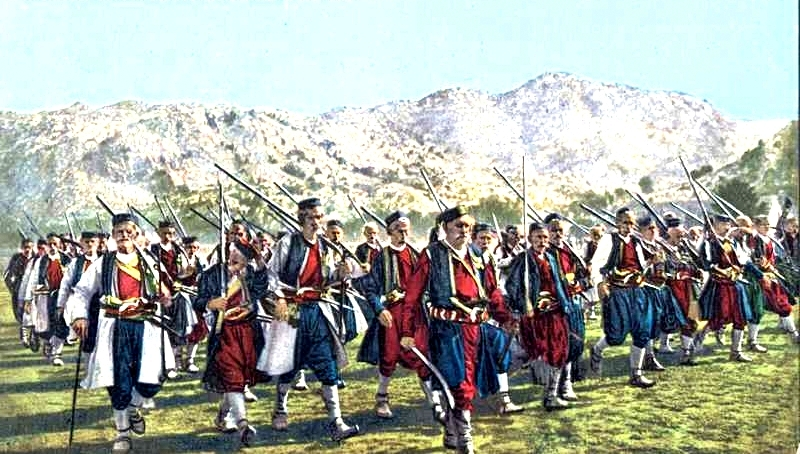
Montenegrins marching out to battle from Ozrinići.

The village was founded by five families of the Ozrinići tribe in 1597. Apart from the Ozrinići descendants, from the 18th century onwards there were families that settled from Banjani, Kriči, Pješivci, and from other regions and tribes.

In March 1942, during the leftist errors of the World War II in Yugoslavia, Ozrinići was burned down by Partisans from Nikšić.

== Demographics ==
According to the 2011 census, the town has a population of 2,057 people.

According to the 2023 census, its population was 1,911.

Ethnicity in 2023
Ethnicity	Number	Percentage
Montenegrins	1201	62.85%
Serbs	596	31.19%
Serbs Montenegrins	16	0.84%
other/undeclared	65	3.42%
Total	1911	100%
