= Kaluđerović =

Kaluđerović (Serbian Cyrillic: Калуђеровић) is a Serbian surname, popular in Serbia and in Montenegro, derived from kaluđer, meaning "monk". It may refer to:

- Andrija Kaluđerović (born 1987), Serbian professional footballer
- Nebojša Kaluđerović (born 1955), Montenegrin politician
- Nenad Kaluđerović, person who shot and killed the perpetrator of the 2022 Cetinje shooting
- Željko Kaluđerović (born 1964), retired Montenegrin goalkeeper

== See also ==
- Kaluđerski
- Kaluđerčić
