= Kadina Luka =

- Village (Selo)
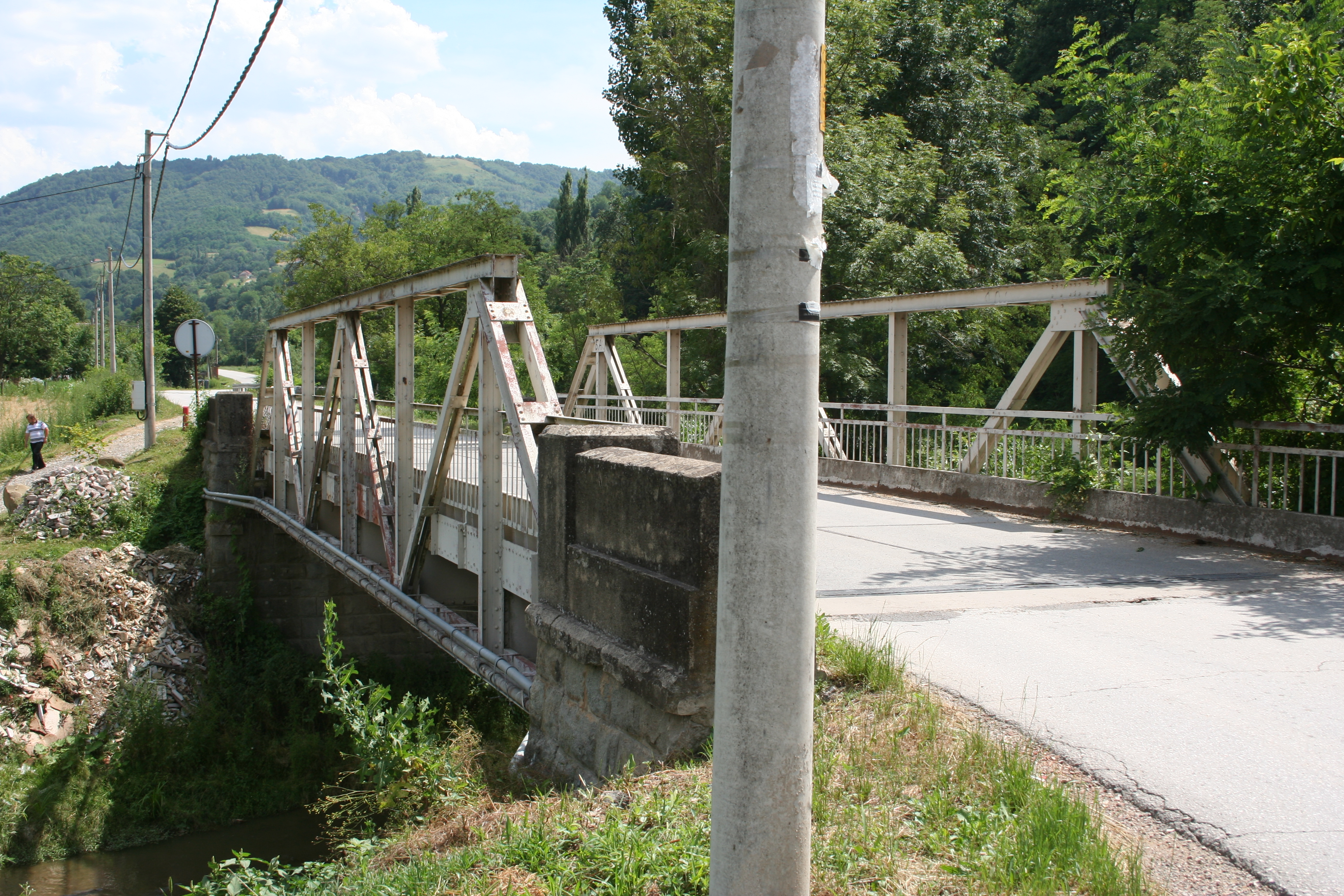

- Location within Serbia
- Coordinates: 44°11′35″N 20°13′10″E
- Country: Serbia
- District: Kolubara District
- Municipality: Ljig
- Time zone: UTC+1 (CET)
  - Summer (DST): UTC+2 (CEST)

Kadina Luka is a village situated in Ljig municipality in Serbia.
