= Aleksandar Bjelogrlić =

Serbian novelist, short story writer, essayist, and translator, (1967–2019)

Aleksandar Bjelogrlić (8 February 1967 - 6 February 2019) was a Serbian novelist, short story writer, essayist and translator, distinguished for his evocative, sometimes plain prose style and almost exclusive reliance to contemporary settings mixed with mystery and fantasy motifs.

== Early life ==
Born in Zrenjanin, he studied Comparative literature at the University of Belgrade Faculty of Philology.

== Work ==
Igra gluvih telefona (Dead telephones game) was his first published story that came out in 1991 in the pages of Letopis matice srpske, one of the most prominent Serbian literary magazines. The story was later slightly adapted and renamed as Anonymous in the short-story collection of the same title published in 2005.

Besides this, Bjelogrlic's bibliography includes short story collections Kraken (1995), Temeljna opcija (Basic Option, 2007) and Citadela (Citadel, 2012), as well as a critically well acclaimed novel Brazilski akvarel (Brazilian Aquarelle, 2010), a mystery thriller encompassing such different settings as French Guiana, Vojvodina and Moscow. Centered on the character of a retired leggionaire, Aquarelle explores deeply rooted folk believings through narrative immersed in the atmosphere of utmost social corruption.

His collections of essays Nevidljivi arhipelag (Stealth Archipelago, 1994) and Tri eseja o zduhacu pripovedanja (Three Essays On the Dybbuk of Narration, 2000) respectively deal with the themes of mysticism in literature and narratology. His essay Kafka’s Poor Chirihau was published in Boston University's Partisan Review in 1998.

His translations from English to Serbian include Tim Parks’ novel Shear, Doris Lessing’s London Observed, Montague Rhodes James’ ghost stories collection and Robert James Waller’s A Thousand Country Roads.

He was an editor with the Serbian regional newspaper Zrenjanin and occasional contributor to leading national newspapers and magazines. His column Rocky Inspires Success in Serbia, dealing with the challenges and perspectives of the Serbian social and economic transition, appeared in the Transitions Online journal in 2007, from where it was republished in the Businessweek magazine that same year.

He died on 6 February 2019 at the age of 52.
