= Teočin =

- Village
- Location within Serbia
- Coordinates: 44°04′05″N 20°14′04″E
- Country: Serbia
- District: Moravica District
- Municipality: Gornji Milanovac

Population (2002)
  - Total: 690
- Time zone: UTC+1 (CET)
  - Summer (DST): UTC+2 (CEST)

Teočin is a village in the municipality of Gornji Milanovac, Serbia. At the 2002 census, the village had a population of 690 people.

The village was active in the Serbian Revolution, being organized into the knežina (administrative unit) of Brusnica (Takovo) during the First Serbian Uprising (1804–13). Among notable local revolutionaries were buljubaša and vojvoda Milić Drinčić (1775–1815), his brothers Stefan Drinčić and Jovan Drinčić, Sako Kozoder, Todor Belja, Markelja Sarić, Vukosav Brković, Vučić Kozoder.
