= Bobija =

Mountain in western Serbia

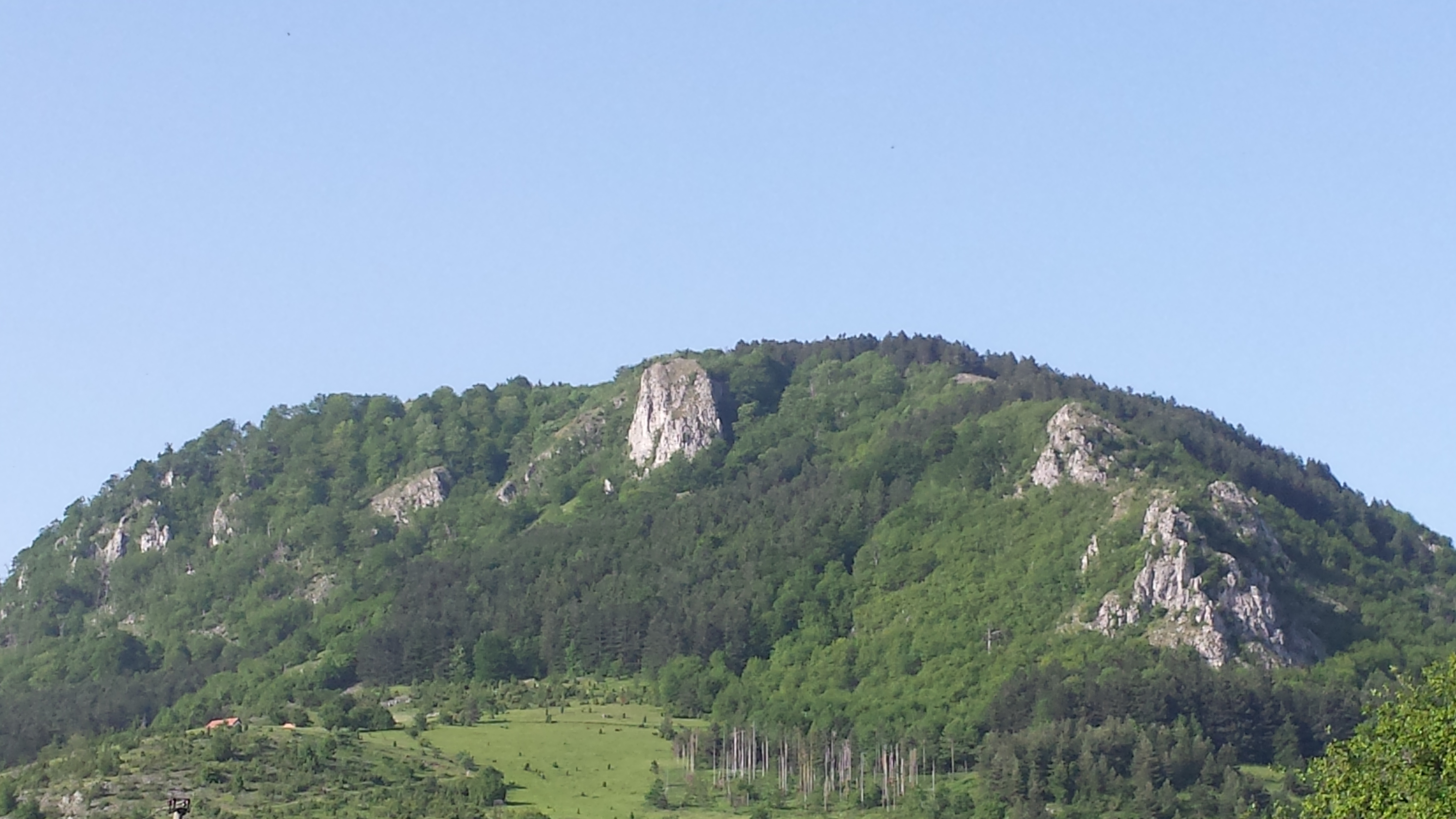

Highest point
- Elevation: 1,272 m (4,173 ft)
- Coordinates: 44°11′49″N 19°33′16″E

Geography
- Location within Serbia
- Location: Western Serbia
- Parent range: Dinaric

Bobija (Serbian Cyrillic: Бобија) is a mountain in western Serbia, near the town of Ljubovija. Its highest peak, Tornička Bobija, has an elevation of 1,272 m (4,173 ft) above sea level.

== See also ==
- List of mountains in Serbia
