= Kačer (region) =

Geographical subregion of Šumadija, Serbia

Kačer (Serbian: Качер) is a geographical subregion of Šumadija in central Serbia. The most notable settlements are Ljig, Belanovica and Rudnik.

== History ==
During the First Serbian Uprising (1804–13), the Kačer area was organized into a knežina (administrative unit) of Revolutionary Serbia, belonging to the Rudnik nahiya. The Rudnik nahiya had included two knežina (Christian self-governing village groups) prior to 1804, the Crna Gora–Podgora (which included what is later known as the Takovo area), and the Rudnička Morava (area from Vujan to Western Morava); with the uprising, the Kačer knežina was organized, including the northern and western foothills of Rudnik to the eastern part of the Jasenica river.

The Rudnik nahiya was liberated at the start of the uprising, and Karađorđe appointed Milan Obrenović the vojvoda of the Rudnik nahija; Obrenović appointed Arsenije Loma the buljubaša (captain) of Kačer.

The villages of Kačer involved in the uprising were Dragolj, Garaši, Bosuta, Šutci, Rudnik, Kamenica Rudnička, Stragari, Krćevac, Živkovci, Moravci, Ugrinovci, Zagrađe, Gornja Crnuća, Donja Crnuća, Vrbava (now Gornja Vrbava and Donja Vrbava), Jarmenovci, Šilopaj, Smrdljikovac (now Brajkovac), Mutanj. Among the most notable participants in the Serbian Revolution that hailed from Kačer are:

- Arsenije Loma (1770–1815), vojvoda (general) of Karađorđe, from Dragolj.
- Milutin Savić (1762–1842), obor-knez (mayor) of Jasenica under Miloš Obrenović, from Garaši.
- Antonije Ristić-Pljakić (1781–1832), vojvoda of Karanovac, from Kamenica.
- Janićije Đurić-Dimitrijević (1779–1850), Karađorđe's secretary, from Stragari.
- Atanasije Rajić (1765–1815), Karađorđe's barjaktar (flag-bearer) and tobdžija (cannoneer), from Stragari.
- Milentije Pavlović (1766–1833), Miloš Obrenović's follower, from Vrbava.
- Uzun-Mirko (1782–1868), bimbaša (captain), from Smrdljikovac.

The Kačer knežina was commanded by Arsenije Loma, titled vojvoda of Kačer (vojvoda Kačerski).

During the reign of Prince Miloš Obrenović, the seat of the Kačer knežina was in Blaznava, and then from 1830 in the Rudnik village. From 1830, the knežina was renamed to srez.

== Geography ==
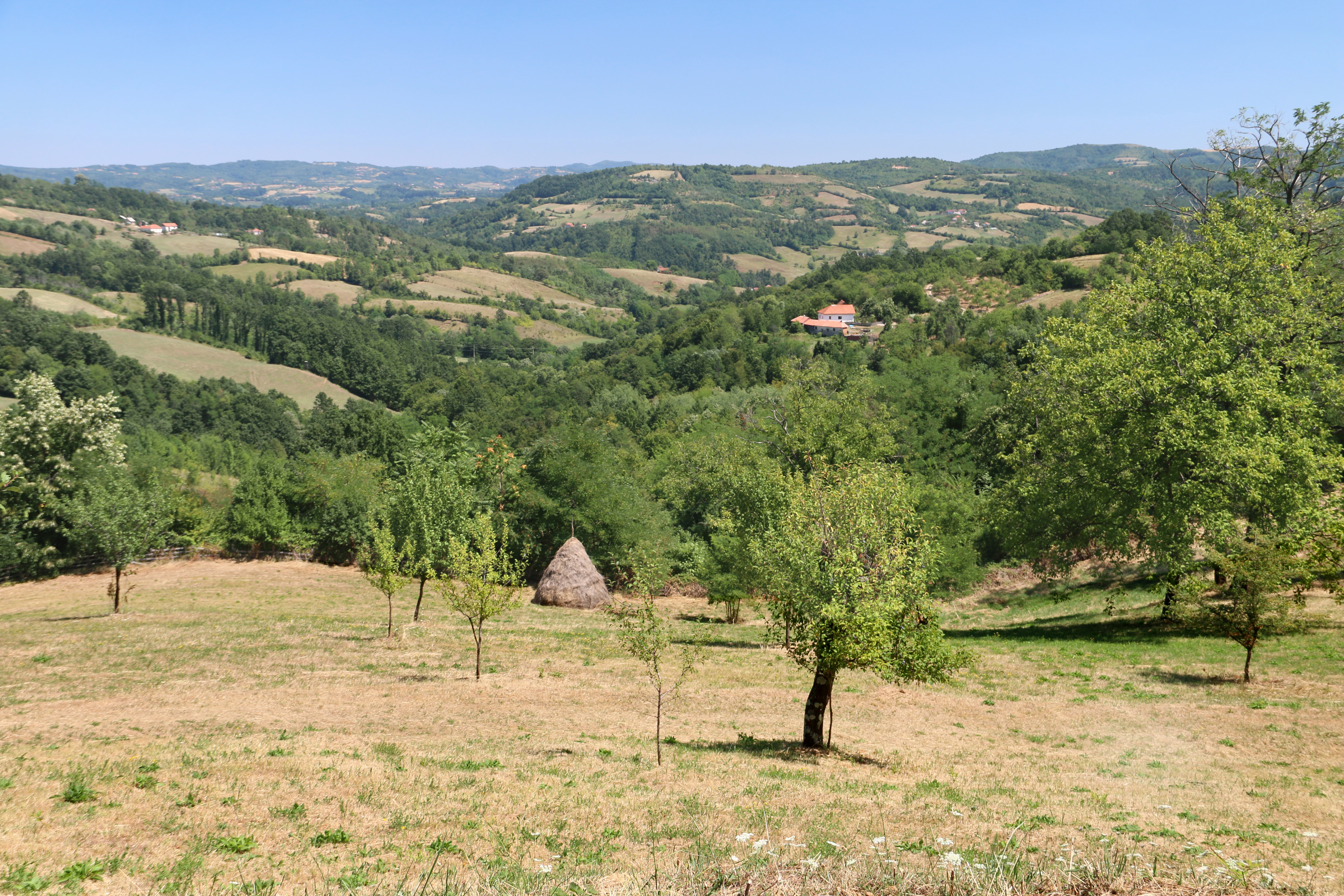
View of Dragolj village

The region borders on the Rudnik mountain to the south and Vagan height to the north, Jarmenovci and Bosuta to the east, Kadina Luka, Slavkovica and Cvetanovac to the west. The region is further divided into parts, such as visoki ("high"), with villages around the Rudnik mountain; gornji ("upper") with Belanovica and the surroundings; donji ("lower") with Ljig. The most notable settlements are Ljig, Belanovica and Rudnik. Kačer is a subregion of Šumadija. Some of the villages of Kačer, currently part of the Gornji Milanovac municipality, are also regarded part of the Rudnik–Takovo region.

== Culture ==
The region includes two Orthodox monasteries, the Blagoveštenje Rudničko and Bogovađa.

== See also ==
- List of regions of Serbia

== Sources ==
- Čeliković, Borisav, ed. (2011). Rudnički okrug, Rudnička Morava: naselja, poreklo stanovništva, običaji. Belgrade: SANU. ISBN 978-86-519-0961-3.
- Јаћимовић, Миодраг; Петровић, Драгољуб (2003). Ономастика Качера. Институт за српски језик САНУ.
- Marković, Života (1994). "Представници Рудничке и Пожешке (Чачанске) нахије у Правитељствујушчем совјету и скупштинама народних старешина од 1804. до 1813. године" [Représentants des nahies de Roudnik et de Pojéga (Tchatchak) au Conseil d'administration et aux assemblées des chefs du peuple entre les années 1804 et 1813]. Зборник радова Народног музеја у Чачку. XXIV: 61–82.
- Milićević, Milan Đ. (1876). Кнежевина Србија: географија, орографија, хидрографија, топографија, аркеологија, историја, етнографија, статистика, просвета, култура, управа [Principality of Serbia]. U državnoj štampariji – via Google Books.
- Pavlović, Dragoljub M. (1990). "Учесници српских үстанака од 1804. до 1815. године из Рудничке и Пожешке нахије" [Participants aux insurrections serbes de 1804 et 1815 nés dans les nahies de Rudnik et de Požega] (PDF). Зборник радова Народног музеја у Чачку. XX: 115–131.
- Peruničić, Branko (1968). Čačak i Gornji Milanovac, 1815-1865. Izdanje Istorijskog arhiva.
