= Radoslav Zečević =

Serbian artist

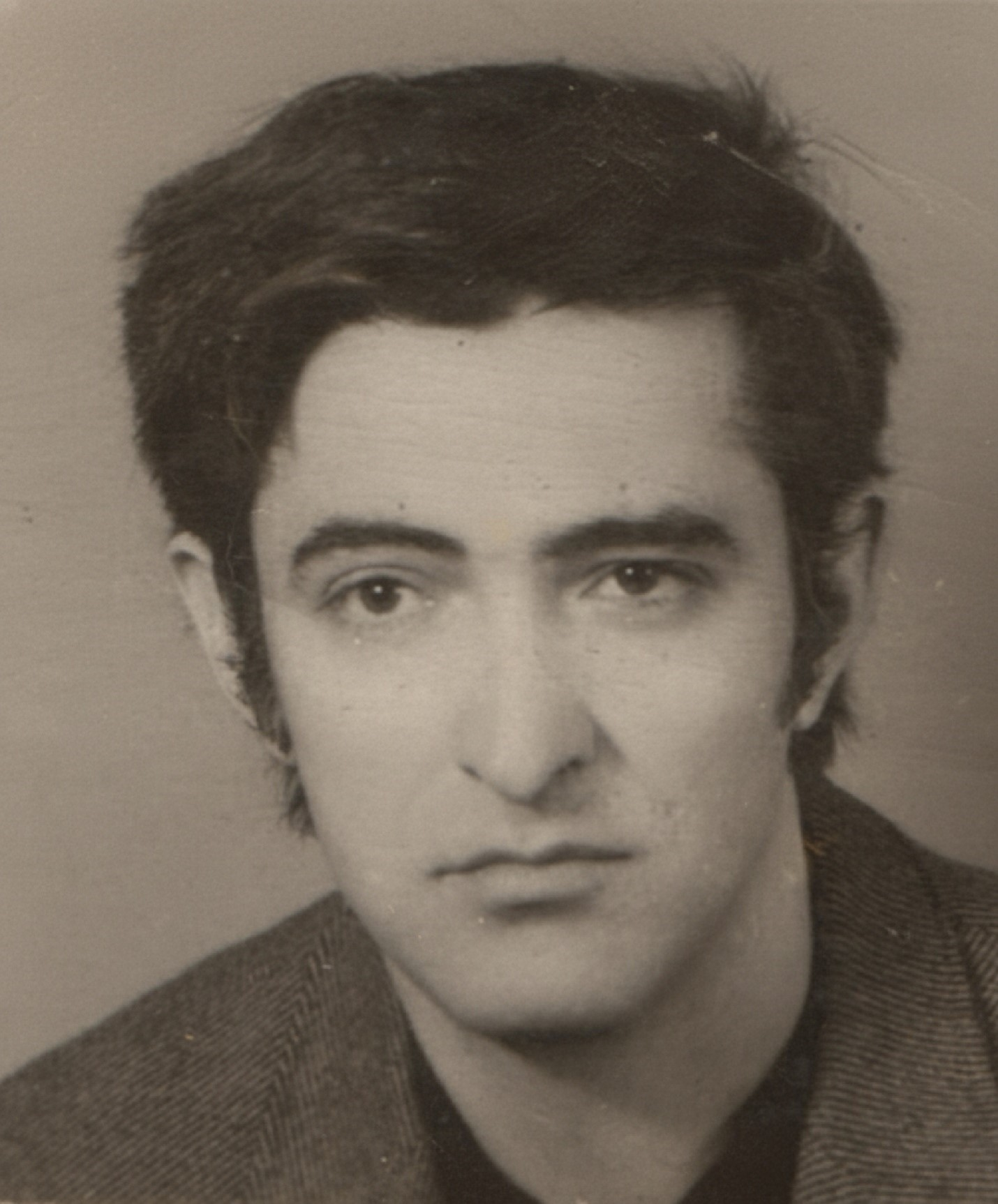
- Born: 24 March 1941 (age 85); Topola, Serbia
- Occupations: illustrator, caricaturist, graphic editor, set designer, costume designer, screenwriter, director (TV)
- Years active: 1959–present
- Spouse: Zorica Zečević (wife)
- Children: Ivan Zečević (son)

Radoslav Zečević (born 24 March 1941 in Topola) is a Serbian caricaturist, illustrator, and visual artist. He is regarded as one of the notable authors who contributed to shaping caricature and the visual identity of children's literature in Yugoslavia and Serbia during the second half of the 20th century. He has long been a member of The Applied Artists and Designers Association of Serbia.

He is best known for his caricatures, illustrations for children's and young adult books, and his collaborations with prominent writers of the period, including Duško Radović, Ljubivoje Ršumović, and Dobrica Erić. His work is characterized by a concise, precise, and humorous drawing style, often based on a confident “single-line” technique that achieves clarity of character and strong narrative expression with minimal visual means.

In addition to his work in publishing, Zečević contributed to children's television programming within Radio Television of Serbia (then Television Belgrade).

== Biography ==
Radoslav Zečević was born on 24 March 1941 in Topola during World War II. He grew up among a generation of peers whose fathers had been interned in German camps during the war, while their mothers assumed responsibility for their families and raised children under difficult circumstances.

Zečević demonstrated a talent for drawing at an early age. Although youthful mischief was part of his upbringing, his aptitude for visual expression distinguished him among his peers and directed him toward a professional career in illustration and caricature.

He published his first caricatures in 1959 in student publications. In the years that followed, he collaborated primarily with specialized cultural publications and avant-garde literary magazines, which were flourishing at the time. His works appeared in journals such as Vidici, Polja, Odjek, and Književne novine. In the early 1960s, he also contributed to the Belgrade magazine Danas, edited by Stevan Majstorović. At that time, the magazine brought together intellectuals of different generations and served as a platform for critical and anti-dogmatic cultural discourse in Yugoslav society.

Zečević also occasionally contributed to the satirical magazine Jež, where he published thematic series of caricatures that differed from the magazine's traditional satirical style and were not focused exclusively on current socio-political issues. He achieved particularly successful collaborations with writers and satirists Duško Radović and Vlada Bulatović-VIB, whose concise and aphoristic style corresponded well with his visual expression based on effective visual gags.

In addition to publishing in domestic periodicals, Zečević also published abroad, including in the German satirical magazine Pardon.

== Artistic work ==
Zečević became a member of the Association of Fine Artists of Serbia at an early stage and began his professional career as an illustrator, initially collaborating with poets and writers of children's literature. His work is characterized by humor, strong narrative qualities, and the ability to visually follow the rhythm and tone of literary texts. He particularly distinguished himself in caricature and illustration for children's and youth literature.

Within Serbian caricature of the second half of the 20th century, Zečević is considered one of the prominent authors of his generation, alongside artists such as Predrag Koraksić Corax and Dušan Petričić.

=== Poletarac and editorial work ===
Zečević was a member of the editorial board of the children's magazine Poletarac, published in Belgrade between 1973 and 1975 within the publishing system of the newspaper company Borba.

The editor-in-chief was Duško Radović, and the editorial board included several notable authors of children's literature: Dragan Lukić, Milovan Danojlić, Dobrica Erić, Ljubivoje Ršumović, Radoslav Zečević, and Dušan Petričić.

Poletarac brought together a generation of authors who significantly influenced modern Serbian children's literature. Its pages also featured works by classical authors such as Jovan Jovanović Zmaj, Petar Kočić, Ivo Andrić, and Desanka Maksimović.

The magazine became known for its high graphic and artistic standards. Its visual identity was largely shaped by Dušan Petričić, with contributions from artists including Miodrag Mića Popović, Ljubica Cuca Sokić, Rastko Ćirić, and Predrag Koraksić Corax.

=== Selected illustrated works ===
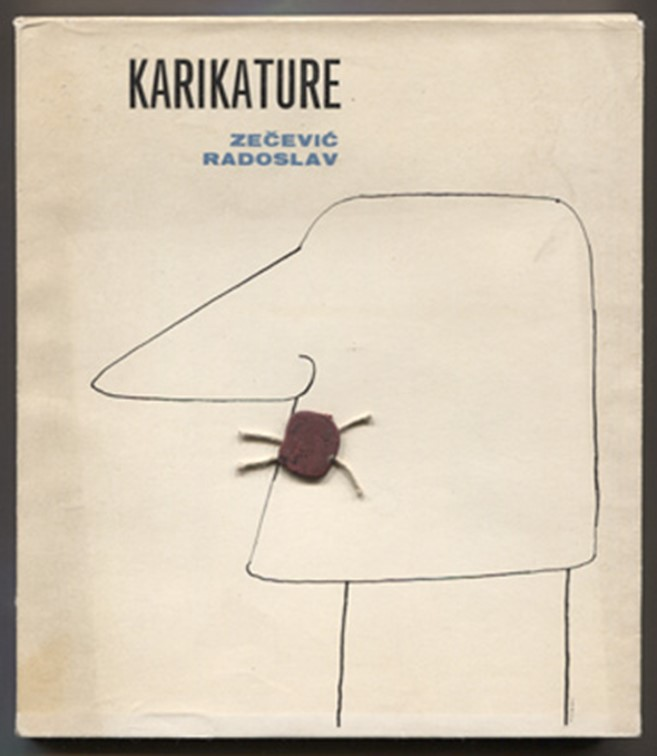
Book cover of Karikature, by Radoslav Zečević (1965)

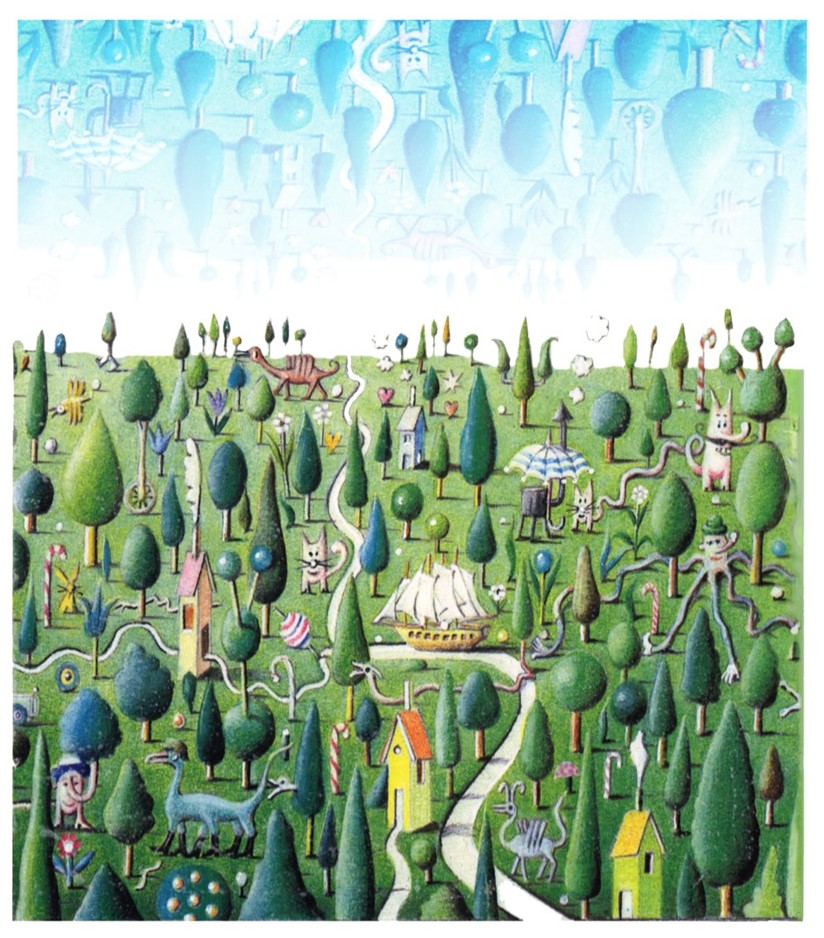
Book cover of Lek od breskvinog lišća, by Zorica Kuburović (1991)

- Dvosmerni rečnik žargona, Dragoslav Andrić
- Karikature (1965), Radoslav Zečević
- Budilnik, Vladislav Bulatović
- Poštovana deco, Duško Radović
- Western, Duško Radović
- Pionir sam tim se dičim, Budimir Nešić
- Ma šta mi reče, Ljubivoje Ršumović
- Levi kraljevi, Miodrag Stanisavljević
- Zelengor, Ahmet Hromadžić
- Čardak između četiri jabuke, Dobrica Erić
- Doba duleka, Dobrica Erić
- Livci, kosači i dvorske lude, Laza Lazić
- Nemušti jezik, Miodrag Stanisavljević
- Pitaju me zašto štrčim, Ljubivoje Ršumović
- Hugo: A Child in His Best Years, Christine Nöstlinger
- Uzjahao Petar vetra, Tatjana Cvejin
- Priče cigana u noći, Zoran Jovanović

=== Television work ===
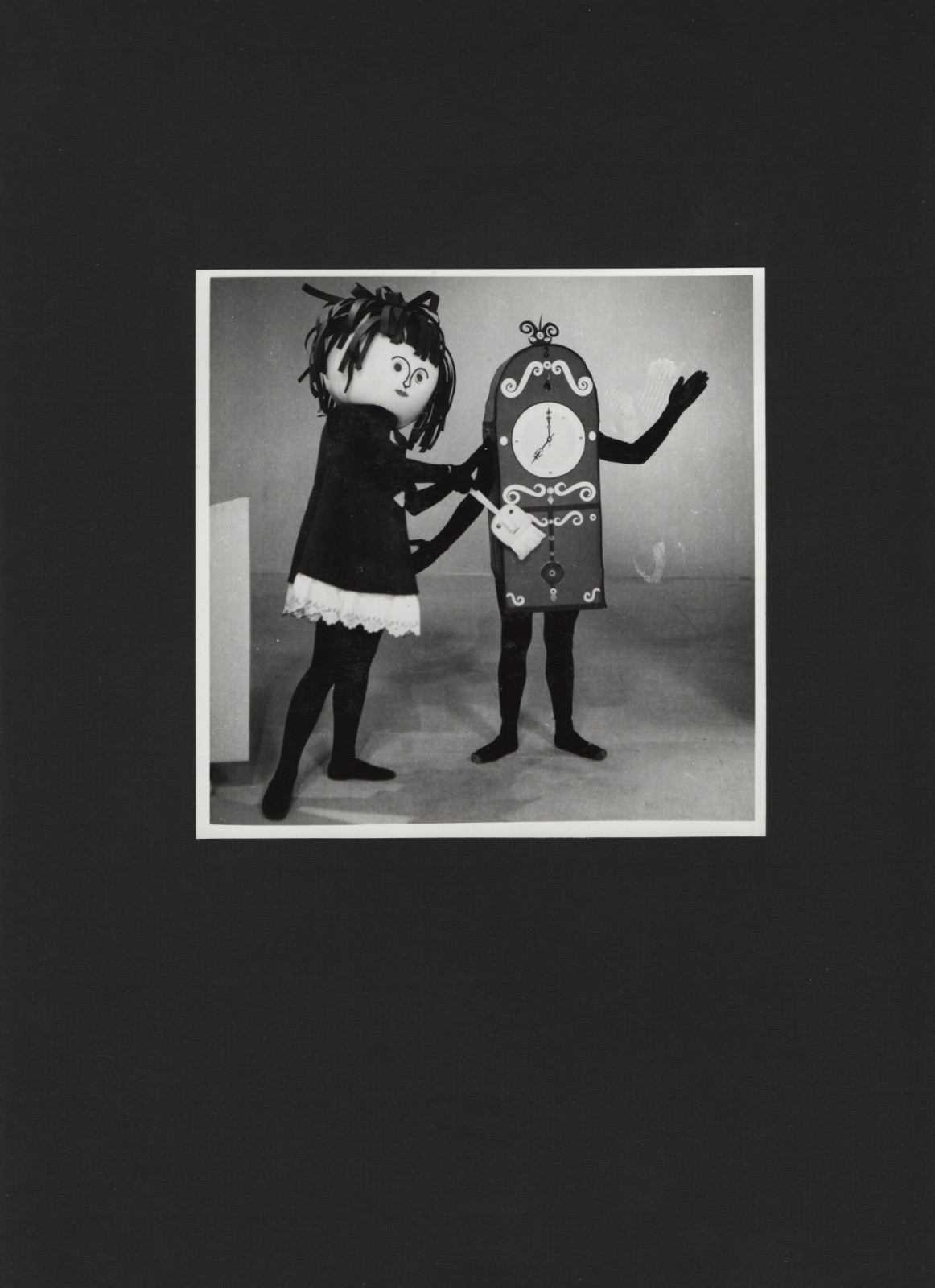
Scenography and costume design for the television show Nina i lutke 2

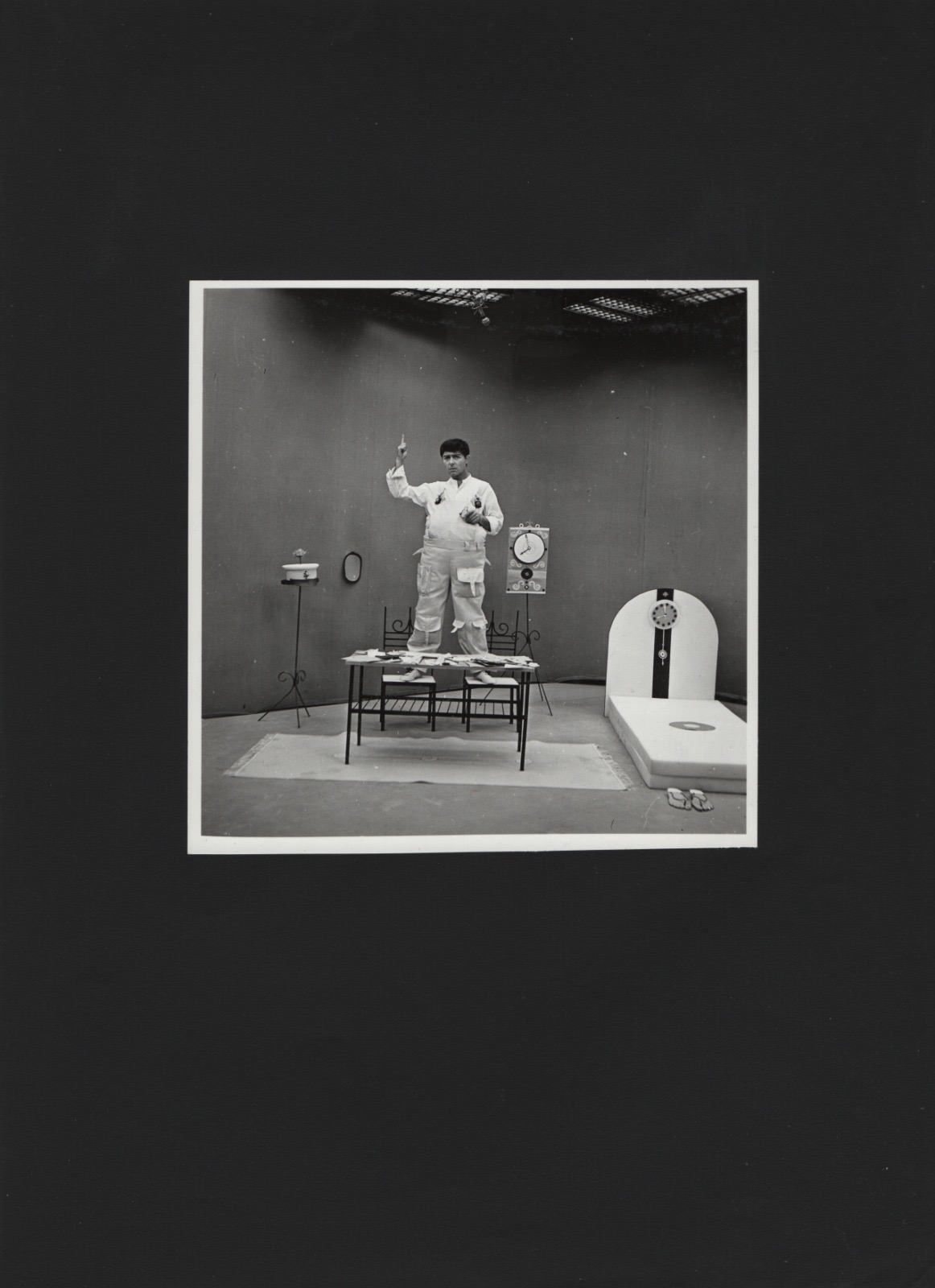
Scenography for the television show Laku noć, deco

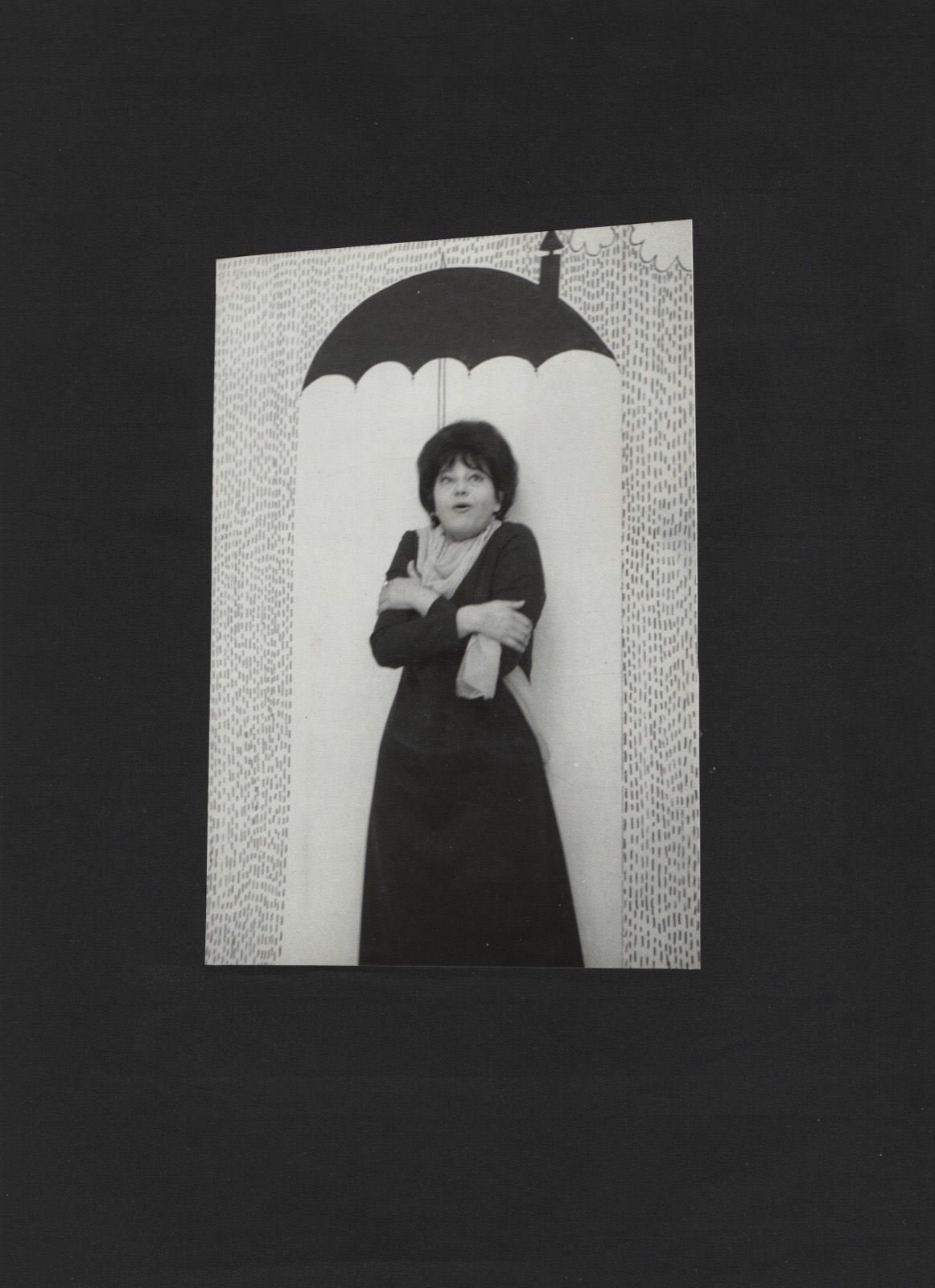
Scenography for the television show Mirina TV stupica

In addition to book illustration, Zečević contributed to children's television programming produced by Television Belgrade (now Radio Television of Serbia). He participated in the production of several programs, including:

- Mirina TV stupica
- Operacija 30 slova
- Mali program
- Nina i Lutka (1967)

His contribution to television lay in bringing the experience of an illustrator into the medium of moving images, shaping scenography, visual identity, and graphic elements of the programs.

=== Collaborations with writers ===
Zečević illustrated works by numerous authors, including:

- Duško Radović
- Ljubivoje Ršumović
- Vladimir Bulatović Vib
- Dragoslav Andrić
- Ahmet Hromadžić
- Budimir Nešić
- Tatjana Cvejin
- Laza Lazić
- Dobrica Erić
- Miodrag Stanisavljević
- Vladimir Andrić
- Christine Nöstlinger

In 1965, he published his own collection of caricatures, Karikature, affirming his work as an independent caricaturist alongside his illustration of literary texts. For Dvosmerni rečnik žargona, he created approximately 1,200 caricatures, of which 500 were included in the published edition.

== Awards ==
- Neven Award for Illustration, 1975

== Significance ==
Radoslav Zečević belongs to the generation of authors who shaped caricature and the visual identity of Serbian children's and youth literature in the second half of the 20th century. As an illustrator and caricaturist, he worked during a period of significant expansion in publishing and television programming for children, collaborating with leading writers of the time, including Duško Radović, Ljubivoje Ršumović, and Dobrica Erić.

== Gallery ==
=== Illustration ===
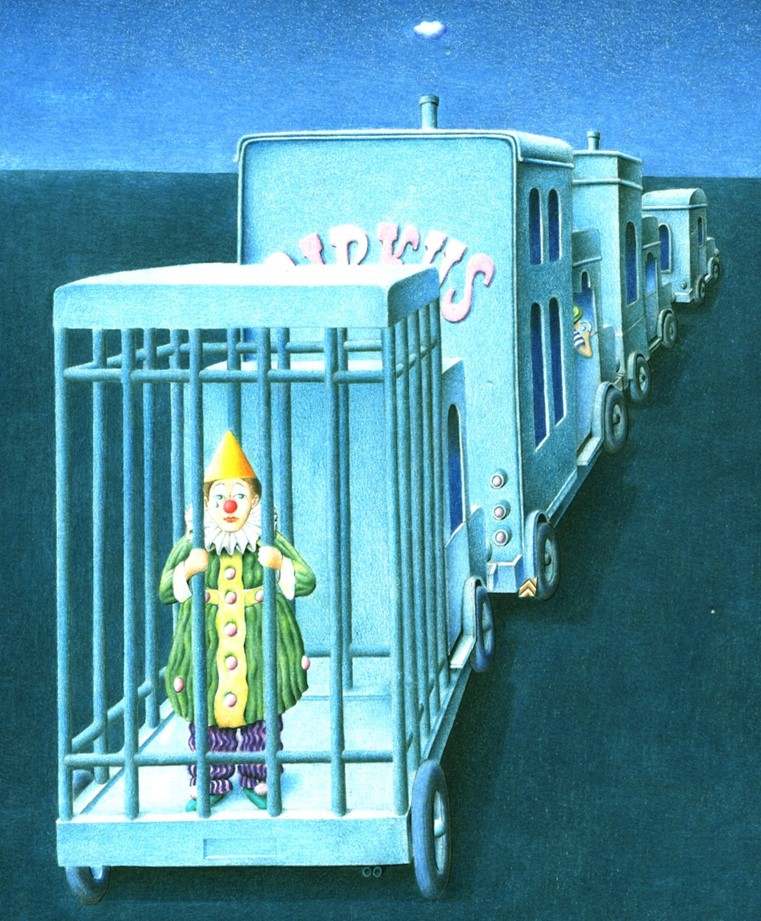
Book cover of Livci, kosači i dvorske lude, Laza Lazić (1981)

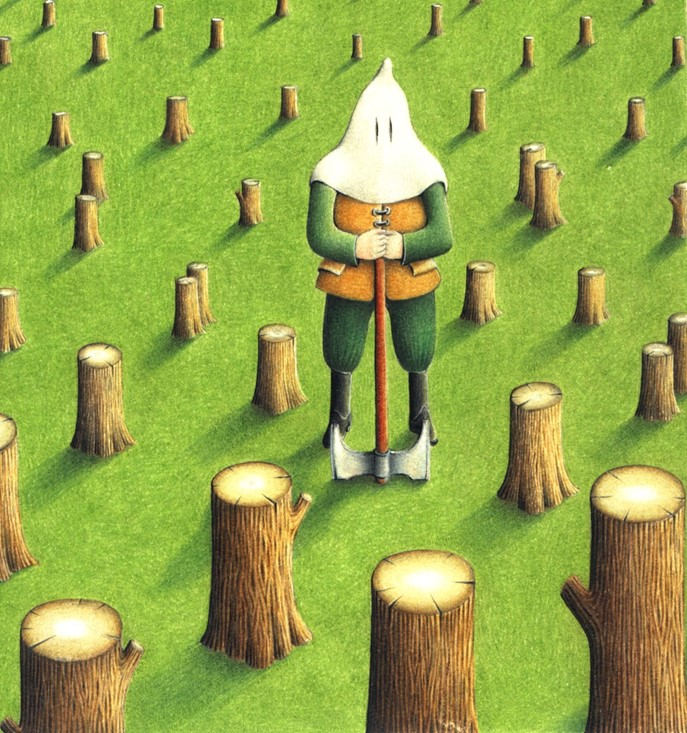
Illustration for Livci, kosači i dvorske lude, Laza Lazić (1981)

==== Illustration for Calendar of the Ministry of Environmental Protection (1997) ====
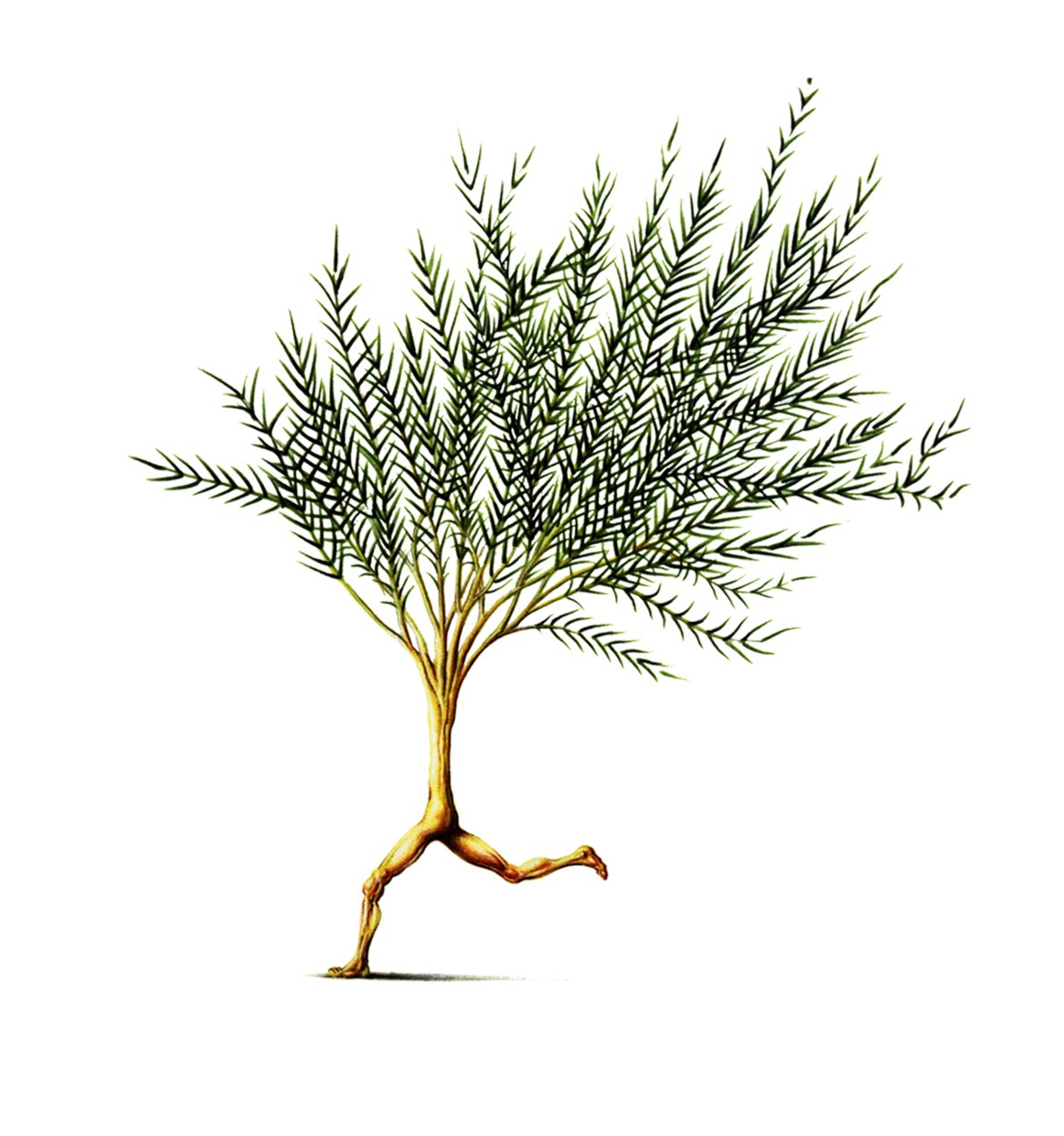
Illustration for Calendar (01)

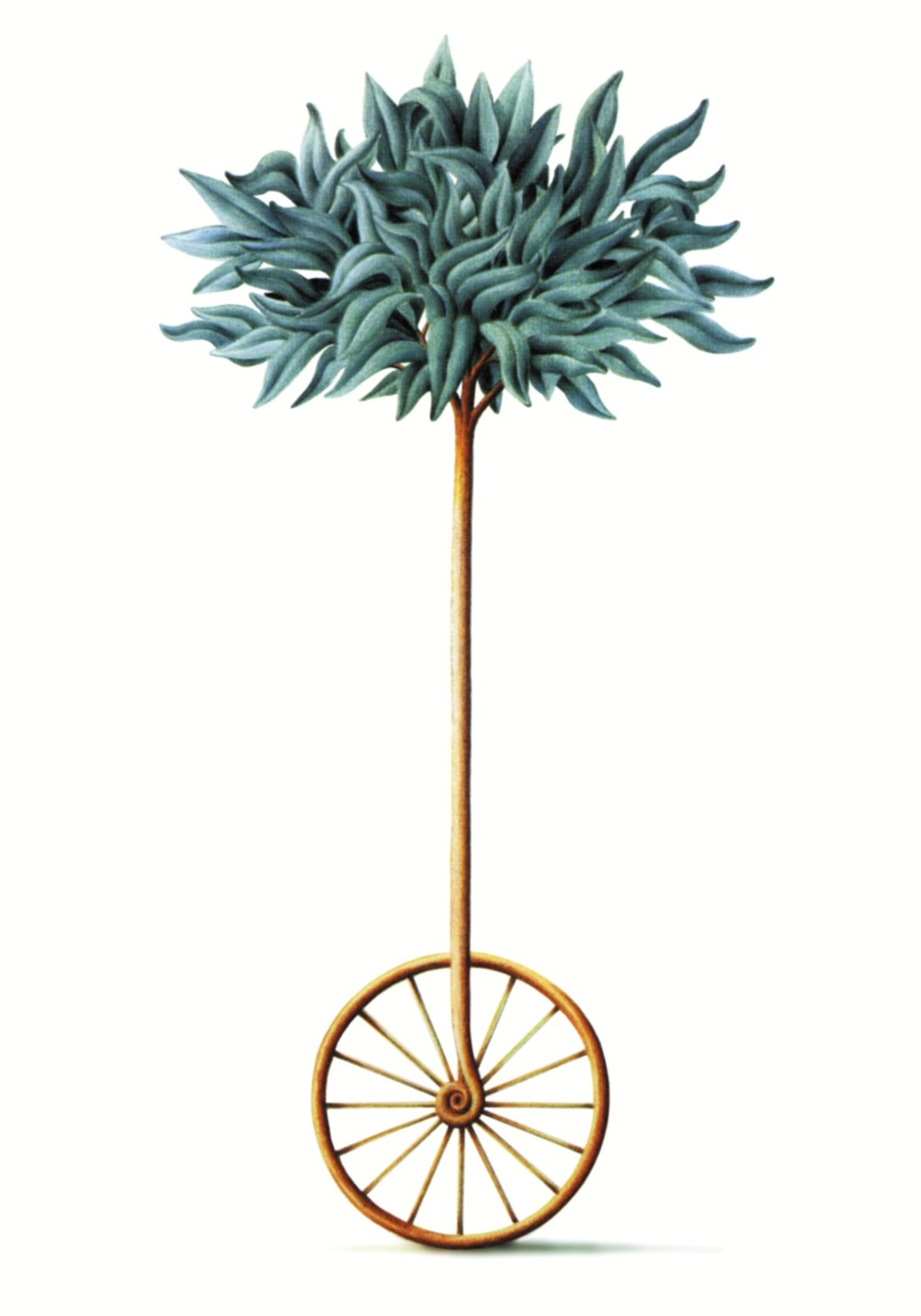
Illustration for Calendar (02)

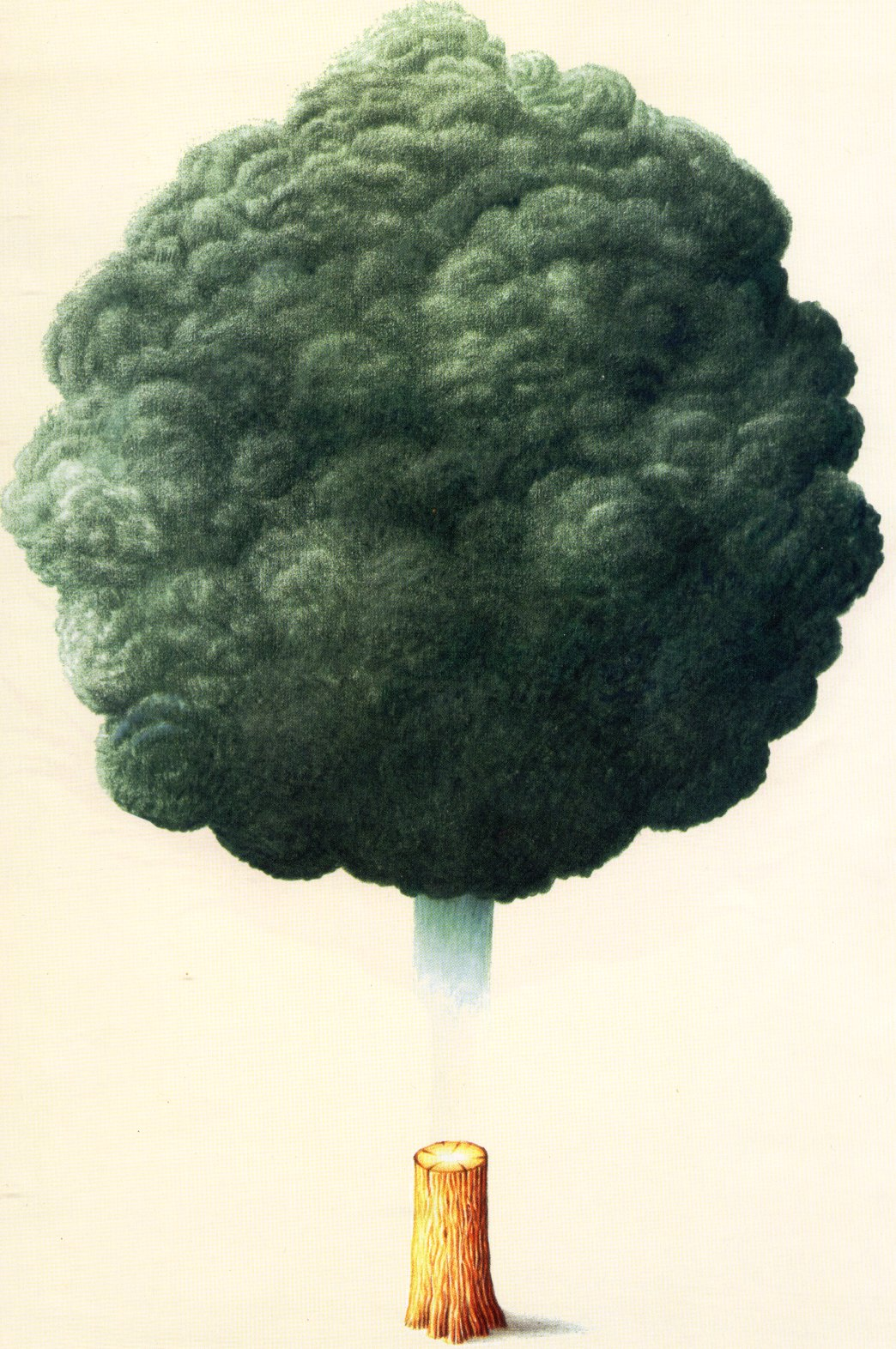
Illustration for Calendar (03)

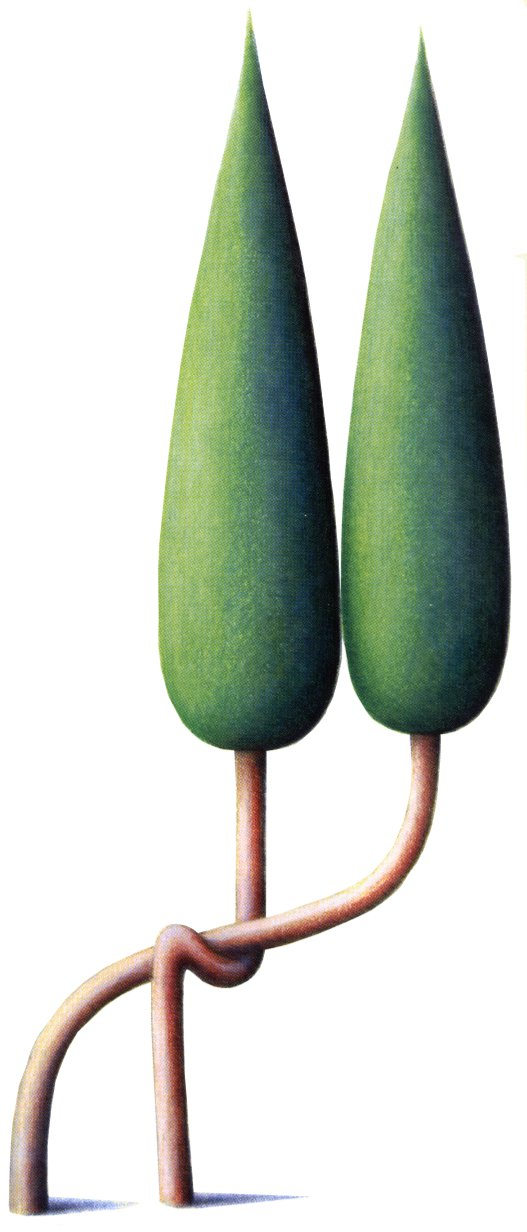
Illustration for Calendar (04)

===== Illustration for the book Rečnik žargona by Dragoslav Andrić =====
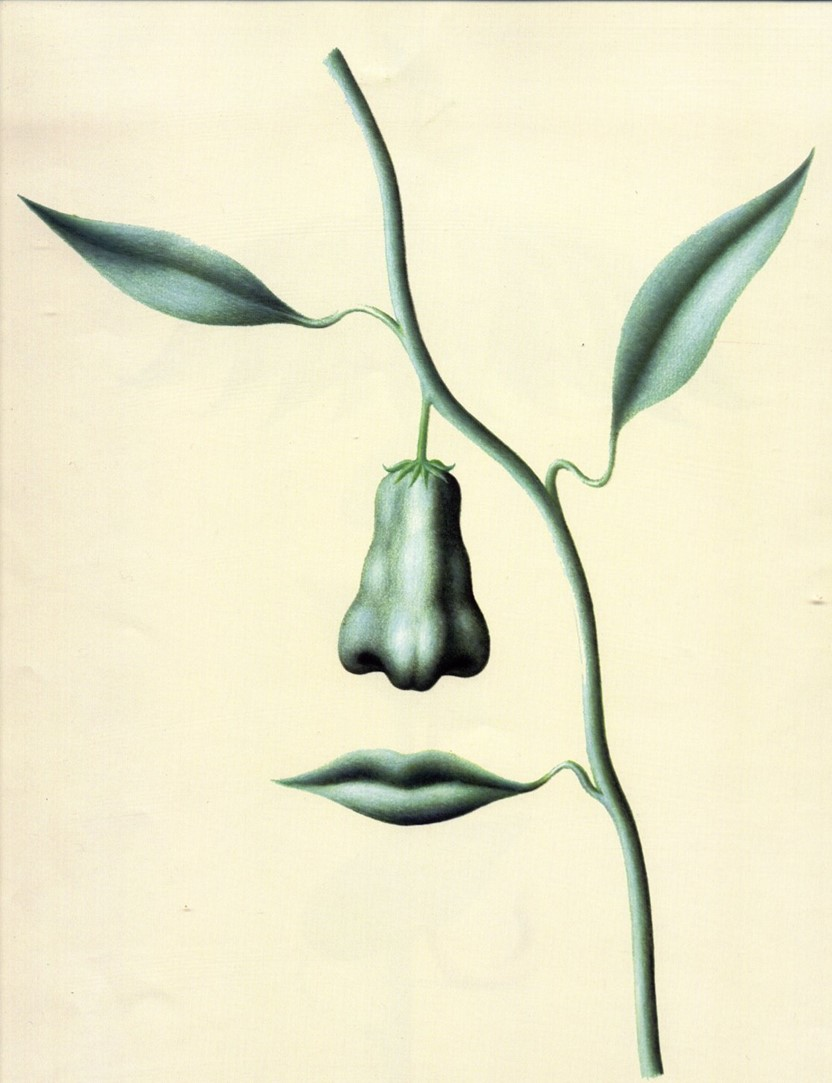
Book cover of Novo izdanje „Rečnik žargona“ (2005)

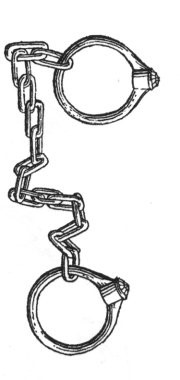
Illustration for letter B (1976)

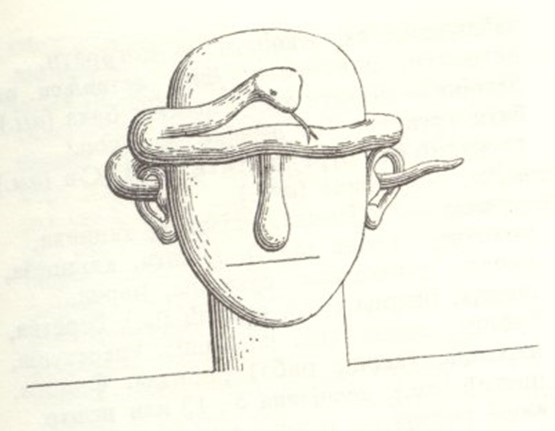
Illustration for letter D 01 (1976)

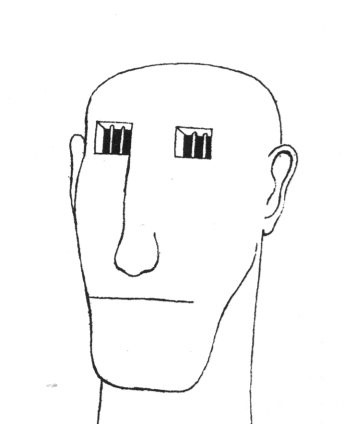
Illustration for letter D 02 (1976)

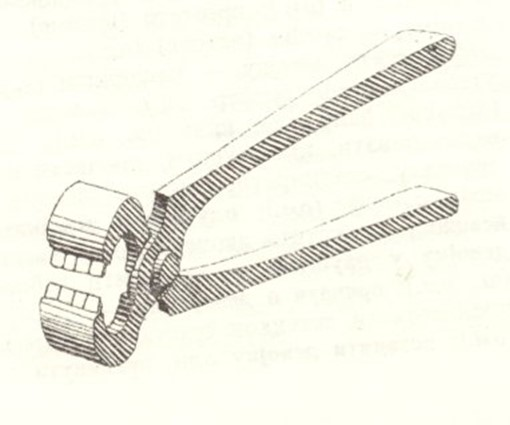
Illustration for letter D 03 (1976)

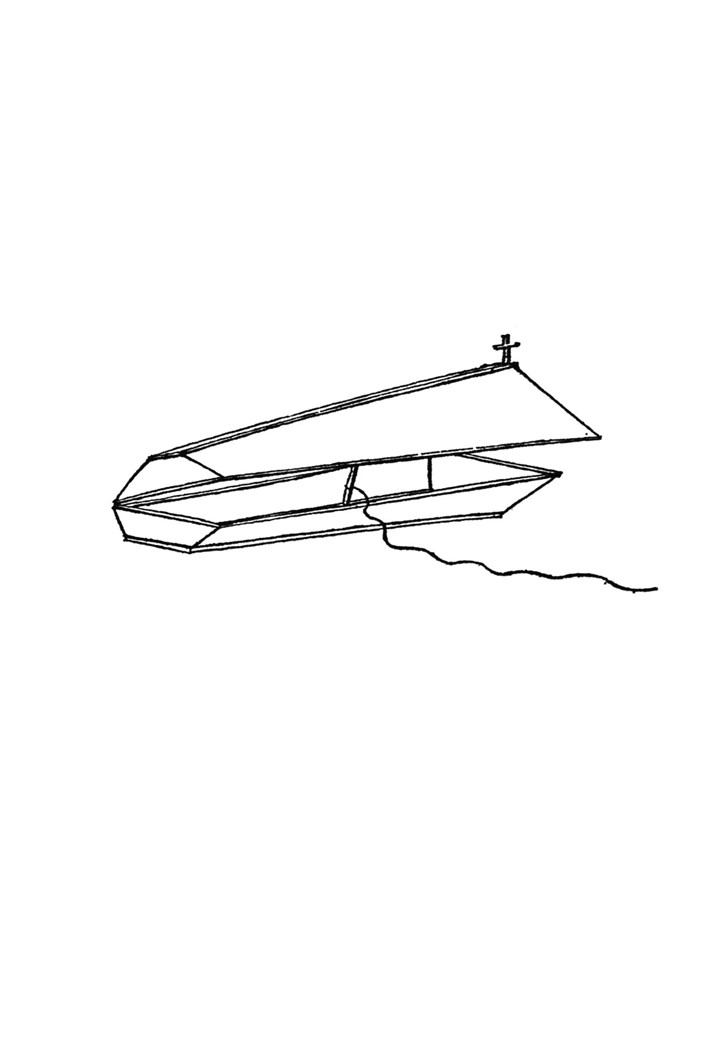
Illustration for letter K (1976)

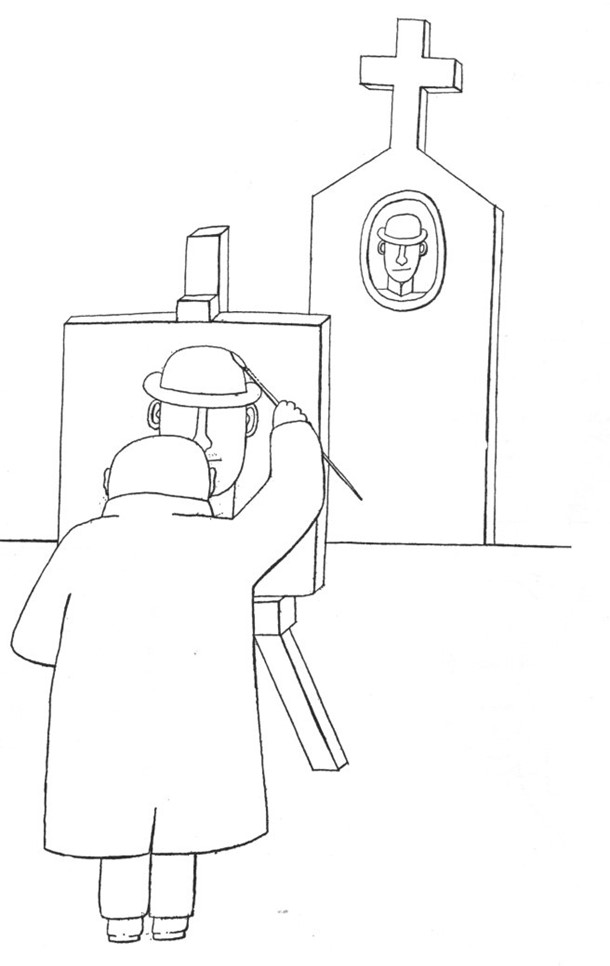
Illustration for letter L (1976)

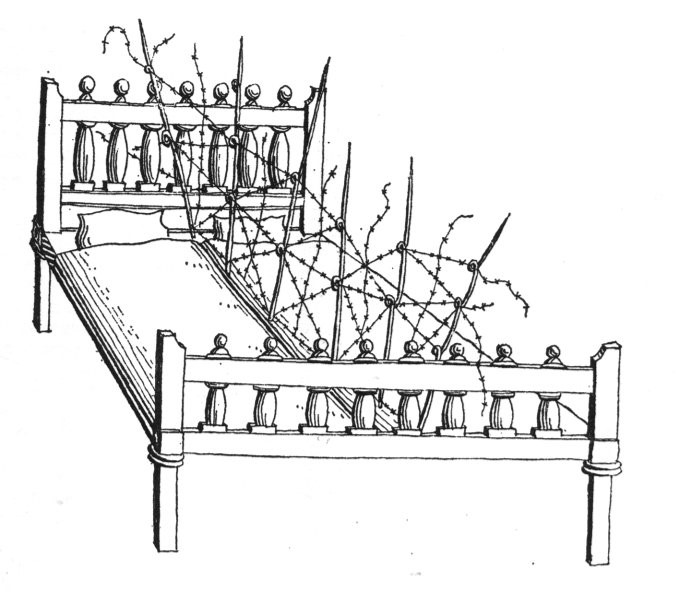
Illustration for letter Z (1976)
