= Kamenica (Gornji Milanovac) =

Kamenica Каменица
- Village
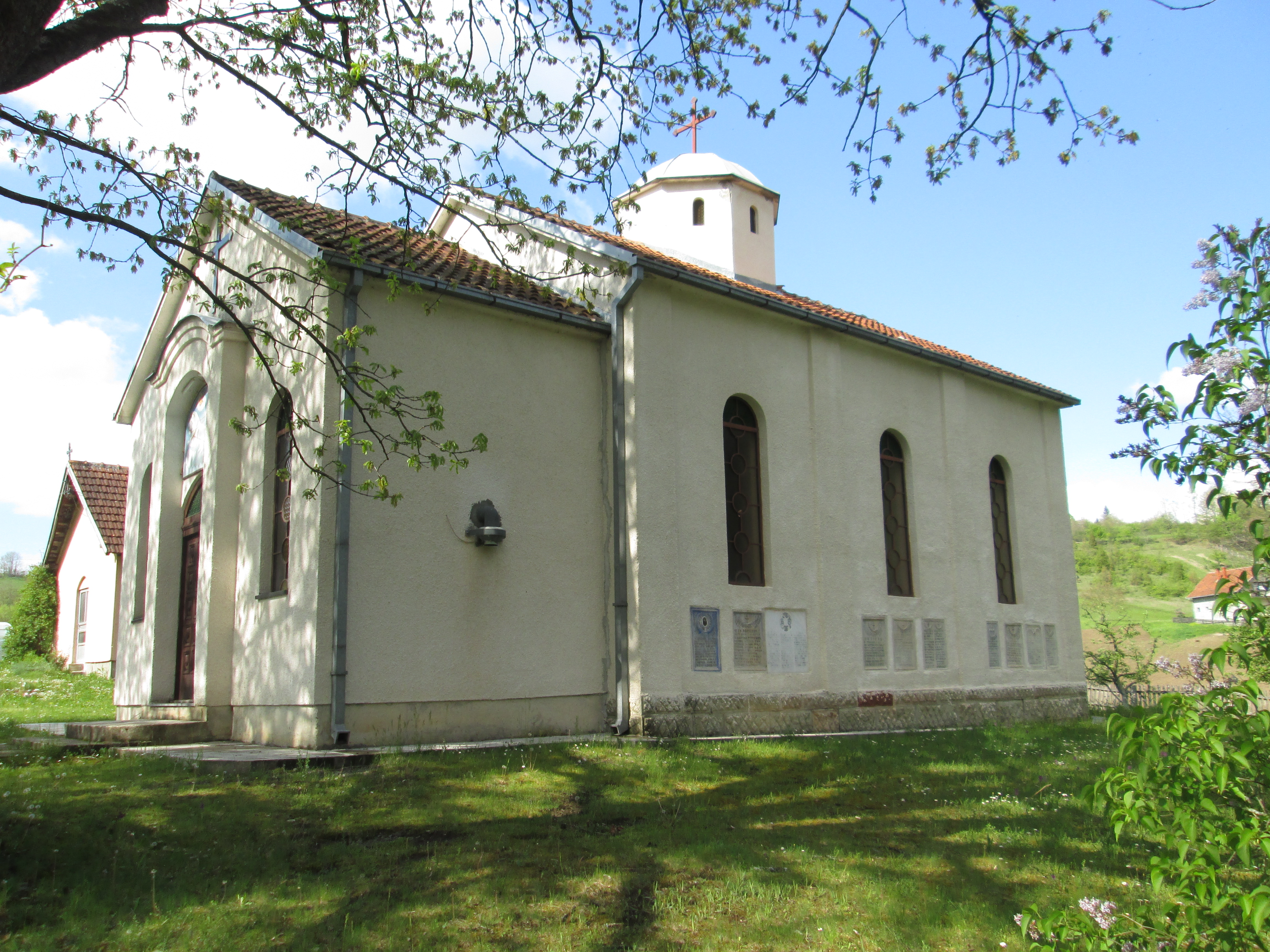
- Church of Kamenica (Gornji Milanovac)

- Location within Serbia
- Country: Serbia
- District: Moravica District
- Municipality: Gornji Milanovac

Population (2002)
  - Total: 37
- Time zone: UTC+1 (CET)
  - Summer (DST): UTC+2 (CEST)

Kamenica (Serbian: Каменица), formerly known as Kamenica Rudnička, is a village in the municipality of Gornji Milanovac, Serbia. According to the 2002 census, the village has a population of 37 people.

The village was active in the Serbian Revolution, being organized into the knežina (administrative unit) of Kačer during the First Serbian Uprising (1804–13). Among revolutionaries from the village were Antonije Ristić-Pljakić (1781–1832), vojvoda (general) of Karanovac and Karađorđe's son-in-law; Pavle Ristić, Antonije's brother; Mirko Milovanović and Radivoje, knez (mayor) of Rudnik; Milisav, buljubaša (captain); Rista arambaša (hajduk leader); Pavle Slepčević; Sima Milosavljević-Paštramac (1776–1836), buljubaša and barjaktar (flag-bearer) of Antonije.

== Notable people ==
- Antonije Ristić-Pljakić, Serbian revolutionary
