= Ugrinovci =

Ugrinovci may refer to:

- Ugrinovci, Belgrade, a village in Serbia
- Ugrinovci, Gornji Milanovac, a village in Serbia
