= Melentije Pavlović =

First Serb Metropolitan of Belgrade

Melentije
- Archbishop of Belgrade and Metropolitan of Serbia
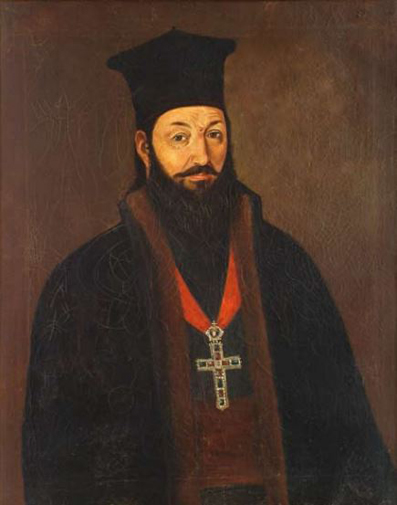
- Metropolitan Melentije, by Georgije Bakalović (1839)
- Native name: Мелентије
- Church: Ecumenical Patriarchate of Constantinople
- Diocese: Metropolitanate of Belgrade
- In office: 1831–1833
- Predecessor: Position established
- Successor: Petar Jovanović

Personal details
- Born: 1776 Gornja Vrbava, Sanjak of Smederevo, Ottoman Empire (modern-day Serbia)
- Died: 11 June 1833 (aged 56–57) Vraćevšnica, Principality of Serbia (modern-day Serbia)
- Denomination: Eastern Orthodoxy

Melentije Pavlović (Serbian: Мелентије; 1776–1833) was a Serbian clergyman that notably participated in the Second Serbian Uprising and became the first Serb Metropolitan of Belgrade, head of the Serbian Orthodox Church in the Principality of Serbia from 1831 until his death in 1833.

== Career ==
Pavlović was born in Gornja Vrbava (formerly Vrbava), a village near present-day Gornji Milanovac (in the Gornja Gruža knežina). His father Pavle and the father of Toma Vučić, Periša, were brothers. He was schooled at the Vraćevšnica monastery, where he also took monastic vows. At that time, Vraćevšnica was also a refuge for clergy from the Studenica monastery. He became a hieromonk at the monastery. On 9 March 1810 he became the hegumen of Vraćevšnica after the death of Josif, and the appointment document has survived, mentioning the electors knez (village mayor) Blagoje from Crnuća, knez Radivoje from Kamenica, kmet (serf) Gaja from Crnuća, buljubaša (captain) Milisav from Kamenica and Pavle Slepčević from Kamenica, and vojvoda Antonije Ristić-Pljakić and archimandrite Vasilije of Studenica.

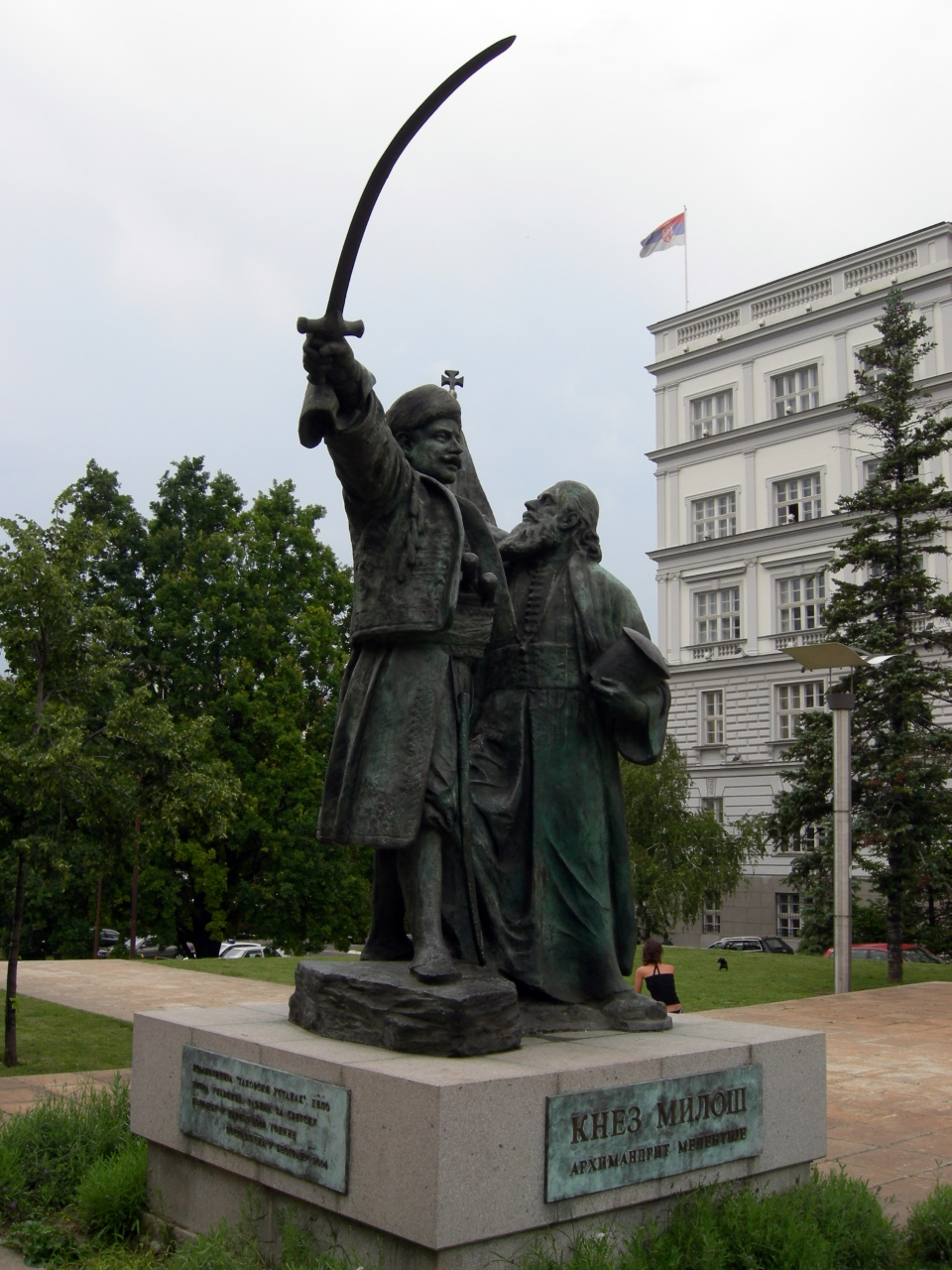
Monument Takovo Uprising by Petar Ubavkić, near Kneza Miloša Street, depicting Prince Miloš and Metropolitan Melentije.

Melentije became friends with vojvoda Miloš Obrenović, whom he worked with. He attended the Takovo Meeting. In the Second Serbian Uprising, led by Miloš Obrenović, he distinguished himself in the battles of Ljubić and Palež. At Ljubić, he served as a dobošar (drummer), and at Palež he and Sima Paštrmac made a looted Ottoman cannon work and used in the battle.

Thanks to his personal courage, Melentije gained the respect of Prince Miloš Obrenović, who in 1818 appointed him a personal confessor of the Obrenović dynasty. With time, Melentije became his adviser, initially in religious matters and later also in general political matters. In December 1822, Miloš appointed him to head the ecclesiastical court (konzistorija) in Kragujevac, together with knez Raka Tešić of Kolubara. In 1823, the Prince entrusted him with the organization of a state school system.

When the Prince reached an agreement with the Ecumenical Patriarchate of Constantinople on the creation of the autonomous Metropolitanate of Belgrade, he pointed out Melentije as the most appropriate candidate. In recommending Melentije to accept chirotony as bishop, the Prince called him the most honest, the most talented and the most respected among the Serb clergy. Melentije was ordained bishop by the Ecumenical Patriarch of Constantinople Constantius I on 18 August 1831. A year later, the autonomy of the Metropolitanate of Belgrade was confirmed. At that moment he was seriously ill.

Melentije, while holding office, determined the administrative division of the Metropolitanate to eparchies and organized a metropolitan office. He forbade church singing in Greek language in Belgrade churches, and he tried to create a printing house in Belgrade; he himself resided in Kragujevac. According to Radomir Popović, a dispute arose between him and the Prince in the last period of Melentije's administration. He died on 11 June 1833.

== See also ==
- List of Serbian Revolutionaries
- Melentije

== Sources ==
- Milićević, Milan (1888). Поменик знаменитих људи у српскога народа новијега доба (in Serbian). Srpska kraljevska štamparija. pp. 491–493.
- Nenadović, Konstantin N. (1884). Живот и дела великог Ђорђа Петровића Кара-Ђорђа. Vol. II (1 ed.). Vienna: У Штампарији Јована Н. Вернаја – via Google Books.
- Popović, Radomir (2013). Serbian Orthodox Church in History. Academy of Serbian Orthodox Church for Fine Arts and Conservation, Belgrade.
- Slijepčević, Đ. (2002). Istorija Srpske Pravoslavne Crkve. Vol. II. JRJ, Beograd.

Eastern Orthodox Church titles
Preceded by New position	Serbian Metropolitan of Belgrade; 1831–1833	Succeeded by Petar Jovanović
