= Dragan Lukić =

Serbian children's writer

Dragan Lukić (Serbian Cyrillic: Драган Лукић; 30 November 1928 – 1 January 2006) was a Serbian children's writer.

== Biography ==
He was born in Belgrade. His mother's name was Tomanija, and his father, Aleksandar, was a pressman, so he acquired an affection for books at an early age.

In 1946 he started to publish, and during the 1950s he became a known children's poet. In 1952, he published his first books (poetry-picture books): The great run (Велика трка) and Animals as football players (Звери као футбалери).

In 1954, he finished his studies of literature on the University of Belgrade Faculty of Philology, and then he worked lecturer of children's literature. After eight years, he started working as an editor of children's program on Radio Belgrade, where he stayed until retirement.

He wrote poems, stories, novels, drama texts, theoretical treatises of literature, he led television and radio shows. He edited magazine "Dragon" ("Змај"). He was regular participator of the most important children's manifestations in ex Yugoslavia. His main co-workers were: Desanka Maksimović, Branko Ćopić, Duško Radović, Arsen Diklić, Ljubivoje Ršumović, Pero Zubac, Dobrica Erić and others.

He published over a hundred books, among which the most famous are: My grand grand father and me, This is where poems live, First class coach, Fifi, How the hoses grow, What daddy says, From home to school, Joca the hunter, City ride. He published novels: Skyscraper C17, The three goosqeteers, Bomb in the coffee, and many other.

Because of his life work, for which he received numerous awards, he is among top Yugoslav and Serbian youth writers.

He was the honorary president of the Zmaj's children games since 1993 until his death. Before him, honorary presidents were Veljko Petrović (1964–1967) and Desanka Maksimović (1967–1993).

After long and hard disease, Dragan Lukić died on 1 January 2006.
