= Varnice =

- Village
- View of Ostrovica with Varnice and Zagrađe in the foreground

- Location within Serbia
- Coordinates: 44°10′N 20°28′E
- Country: Serbia
- District: Moravica District
- Municipality: Gornji Milanovac

Population (2002)
  - Total: 154
- Time zone: UTC+1 (CET)
  - Summer (DST): UTC+2 (CEST)

Varnice is a village in the municipality of Gornji Milanovac, Serbia. According to the 2002 census, the village has a population of 154 people.
