= Majdan (Gornji Milanovac) =

Majdan Мајдан
- Village
- Location within Serbia
- Coordinates: 44°06′N 20°30′E
- Country: Serbia
- District: Moravica District
- Municipality: Gornji Milanovac

Population (2002)
  - Total: 513
- Time zone: UTC+1 (CET)
  - Summer (DST): UTC+2 (CEST)

Majdan is a village in the municipality of Gornji Milanovac, Serbia. According to the 2002 census, the village has a population of 513 people.

== Geography ==
=== Lake Majdan ===
In 1953 a tailings dam was built in order to accumulate the byproducts of the nearby lead and zinc mine. It separates the flotation reservoir from the valley of the Despotovica river, which flows through the town of Gornji Milanovac (8 km (5.0 mi) downstream), and from the Ibar Highway. The dam was built on the small stream of Rudnički potok.

The lake is not open for public use. The lake is 1,000 m (3,300 ft) long, 300 m (980 ft) wide and covers an area of 30 ha (74 acres). The tailings is a result of 264,000 tons of ore which is being treated yearly in the mine: lead, zinc, copper and traces of silver.

Considering the burst of the dam as a potential catastrophe, since the tailings would flood Gornji Milanovac, the dam has been upgraded in time. It is fit to survive the earthquake of the 9.0 magnitude on Richter scale. In 2013 a devices for early notification in case of the quake were installed and are directly connected to the state seismology institute. During the major 2014 Southeast Europe floods, the lake accumulated additional 860.000 cubic metres (30,370.6 cubic feet) of water, which would otherwise flood the town. The flood wave from the slopes of the Rudnik mountain was slowed and effectively prolonged in 5 days instead of sweeping at once. The treating apparatus allows for the clean water to be let through the dam into the Despotovica river.

Several projects are being developed. In 2018 a new system for evacuation of the water in case of emergency will be installed, while by 2023 a new plant will be built which will further treat the wastewaters.

== History ==
The village was active in the Serbian Revolution, being organized into the knežina (administrative unit) of Brusnica (Takovo) during the First Serbian Uprising (1804–13). Among notable local revolutionaries were: Vasa Košanin; Gavrilo Jevtović who fell at Zasavica; Petar Karaklaja who led a hajduk band and progenitor of the Tomašević-Adžić families.
