= Bosuta =

- Village
- Location within Serbia
- Coordinates: 44°14′N 20°28′E
- Country: Serbia
- District: Šumadija
- Municipality: Aranđelovac

Population (2002)
  - Total: 606
- Time zone: UTC+1 (CET)
  - Summer (DST): UTC+2 (CEST)

Bosuta (Serbian: Босута) is a village in the municipality of Aranđelovac, Serbia. According to the 2002 census, the village has a population of 606 people.

The village was active in the Serbian Revolution, being organized into the knežina (administrative unit) of Kačer during the First Serbian Uprising (1804–13). Ilija Dambuba, the barjaktar (flag-bearer) of vojvoda Arsenije Loma, came from Bosuta.
