= Zagrađe (Gornji Milanovac) =

Zagrađe Заграђе
- Village
- View of Ostrovica with the villages of Zagrađe and Varnice in the foreground

- Location within Serbia
- Coordinates: 44°10′N 20°27′E
- Country: Serbia
- District: Moravica District
- Municipality: Gornji Milanovac

Population (2002)
  - Total: 493
- Time zone: UTC+1 (CET)
  - Summer (DST): UTC+2 (CEST)

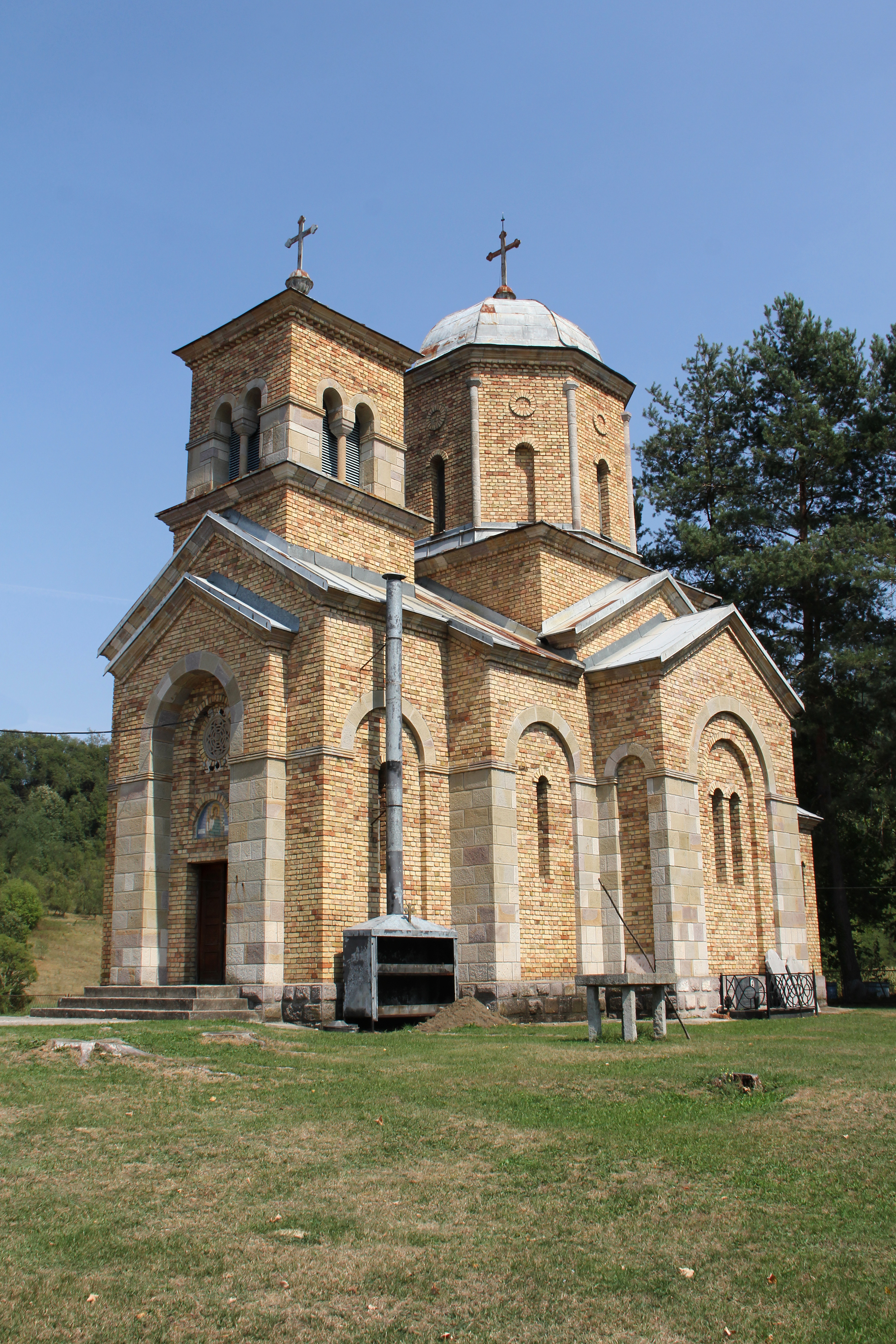
Church in Zagrađe

Zagrađe is a village in the municipality of Gornji Milanovac, Serbia. According to the 2002 census, the village has a population of 493 people.

The village was active in the Serbian Revolution, being organized into the knežina (administrative unit) of Kačer during the First Serbian Uprising (1804–13). Among revolutionaries from the village were Nikola Pejović, Đurđe Petrović, and the drummer (dobošar) of Karađorđe, Gavrilo Pejović.
