= Melentije =

Melentije (Serbian: Мелентије) is a Serbian masculine given name, a version of the Greek name Meletios (Greek: Μελέτιος). It may refer to:

- Melentije Nikšić (1780–1816), Serbian bishop and revolutionary
- Melentije Pavlović (1776–1833), Serbian bishop and revolutionary
- Melentije Stevanović (1766–1824), Serbian priest and revolutionary
- Meletius Tipaldi (fl. 1685–13 May 1713), Orthodox bishop in Venetian Dalmatia
