= Dragolj =

- Village
- Location within Serbia
- Coordinates: 44°13′N 20°27′E
- Country: Serbia
- District: Moravica District
- Municipality: Gornji Milanovac

Population (2002)
  - Total: 364
- Time zone: UTC+1 (CET)
  - Summer (DST): UTC+2 (CEST)

Dragolj is a village in the municipality of Gornji Milanovac, Serbia. According to the 2002 census, the village has a population of 364 people.

The village was active in the Serbian Revolution, being organized into the knežina (administrative unit) of Kačer during the First Serbian Uprising (1804–13). Among revolutionaries from the village were Arsenije Loma (1770–1815), vojvoda (general) of Karađorđe; Milosav Loma, brother of Arsenije; Milovan Lomić (1793–1854), nephew of Arsenije; Nikola, buljubaša of Arsenije; Miloš Arsenijević; Jaćim Petrović.
