= Jarmenovci =

- Village
- Location within Serbia
- Coordinates: 44°11′N 20°33′E
- Country: Serbia
- District: Šumadija District
- Municipality: Topola

Population (2002)
  - Total: 563
- Time zone: UTC+1 (CET)
  - Summer (DST): UTC+2 (CEST)

Jarmenovci (Serbian: Јарменовци) is a village in the municipality of Topola, Serbia. According to the 2002 census, the village has a population of 563 people.

The village was active in the Serbian Revolution, being organized into the knežina (administrative unit) of Kačer during the First Serbian Uprising (1804–13). The knez Petar Stojadinović was from Jarmenovci.
