= Mutanj =

- Village
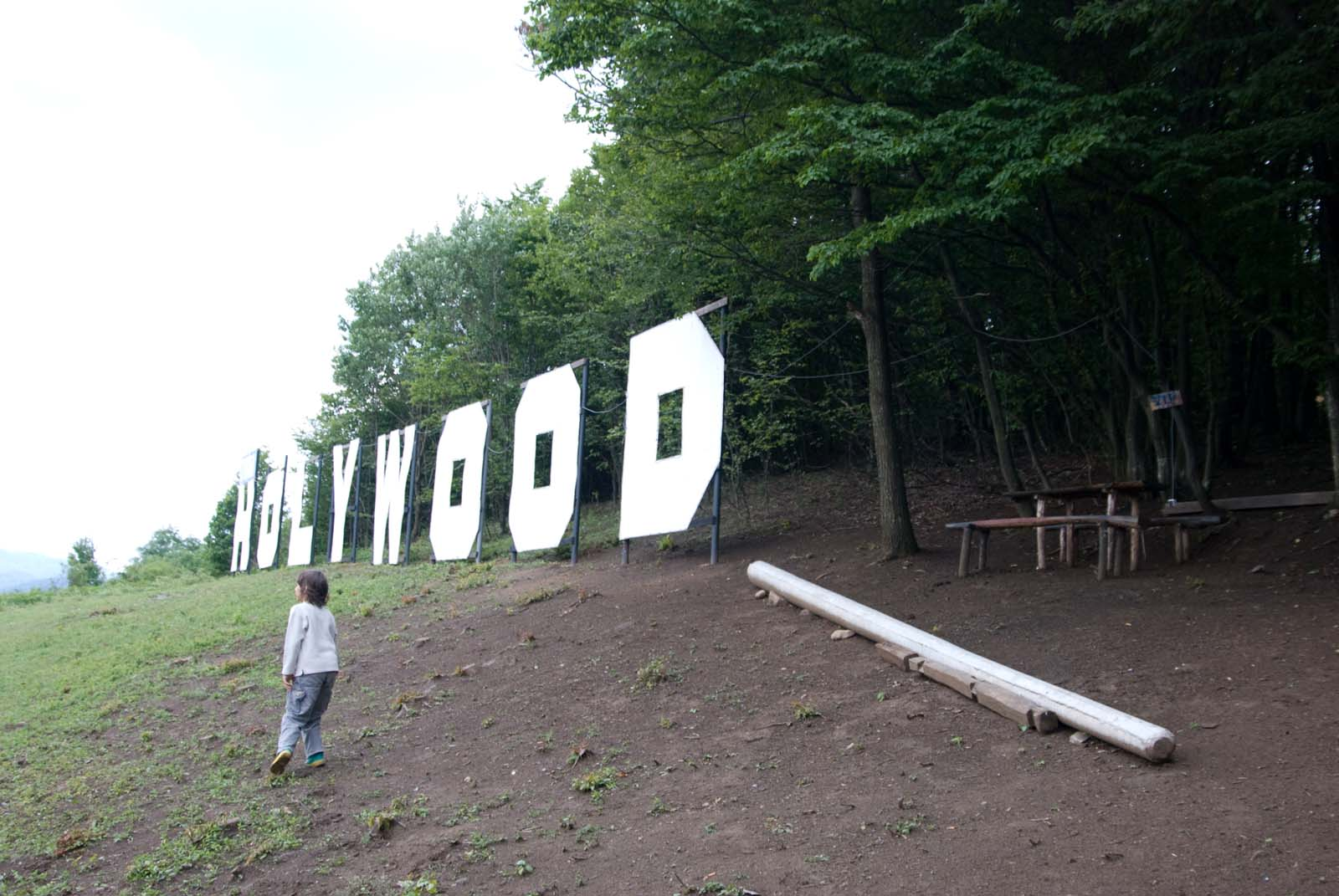
- Hollywood Sign imitation in Mutanj

- Location within Serbia
- Coordinates: 44°07′N 20°28′E
- Country: Serbia
- District: Moravica District
- Municipality: Gornji Milanovac

Population (2002)
  - Total: 104
- Time zone: UTC+1 (CET)
  - Summer (DST): UTC+2 (CEST)

Mutanj is a village in the municipality of Gornji Milanovac, Serbia. According to the 2002 census, the village has a population of 104 people.

The village was active in the Serbian Revolution, being organized into the knežina (administrative unit) of Kačer during the First Serbian Uprising (1804–13). The obor-knez (mayor) Nikola was from Mutanj.
