= Šilopaj =

- Village
- Location within Serbia
- Coordinates: 44°07′N 20°25′E
- Country: Serbia
- District: Moravica District
- Municipality: Gornji Milanovac

Population (2002)
  - Total: 135
- Time zone: UTC+1 (CET)
  - Summer (DST): UTC+2 (CEST)

Šilopaj is a village in the municipality of Gornji Milanovac, Serbia. According to the 2002 census, the village has a population of 135 people.

The village was active in the Serbian Revolution, being organized into the knežina (administrative unit) of Kačer during the First Serbian Uprising (1804–13). The knez Stojan Alempijević and Todor Ivanović were from Šilopaj.
