= Gornja Vrbava =

- Village
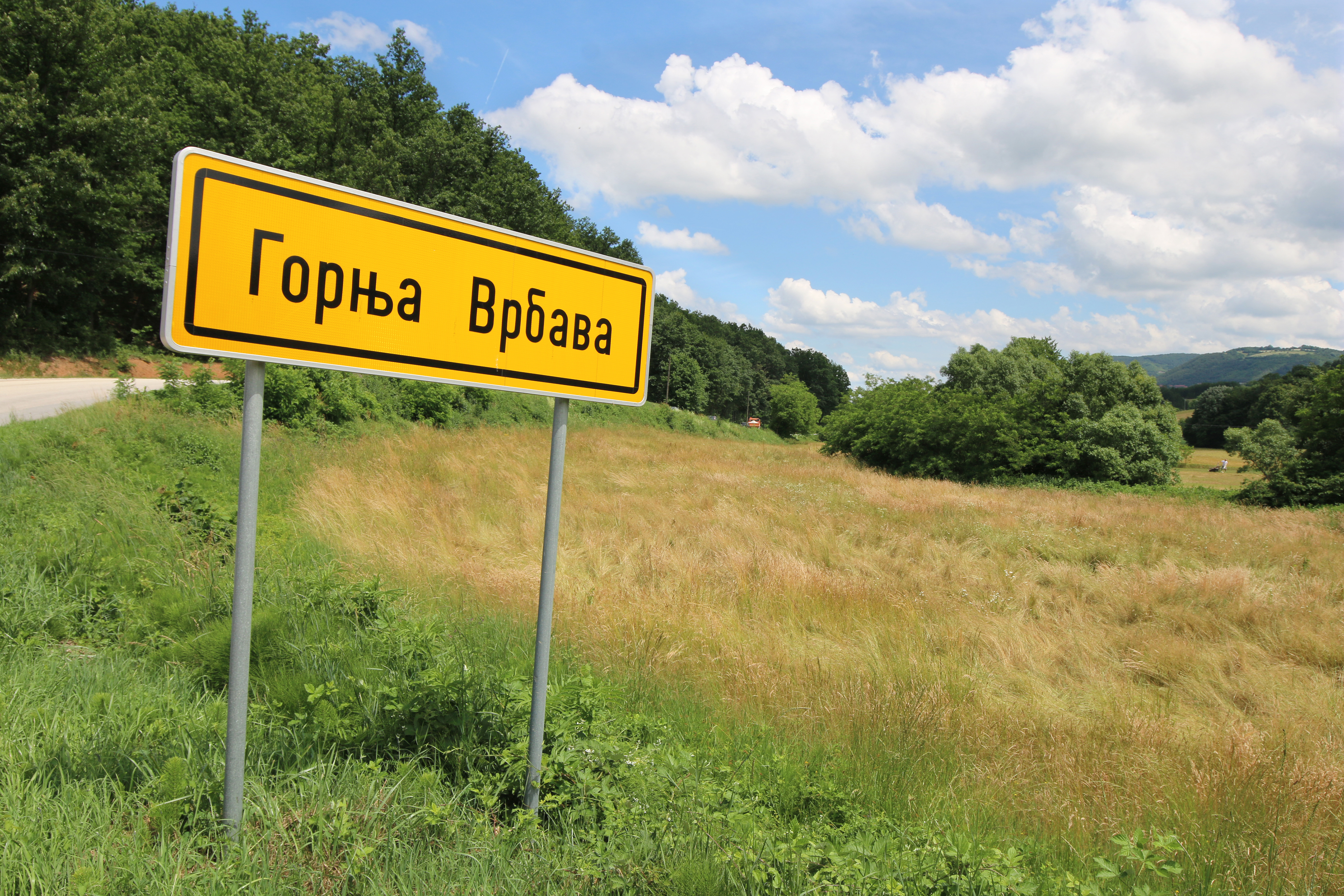

- Location within Serbia
- Coordinates: 44°02′N 20°33′E
- Country: Serbia
- District: Moravica District
- Municipality: Gornji Milanovac

Population (2002)
  - Total: 145
- Time zone: UTC+1 (CET)
  - Summer (DST): UTC+2 (CEST)

Gornja Vrbava is a village in the municipality of Gornji Milanovac, Serbia. According to the 2002 census, the village has a population of 145 people.

The village was active in the Serbian Revolution, being organized into the knežina (administrative unit) of Kačer during the First Serbian Uprising (1804–13). Milentije Pavlović (1766–1833), Miloš Obrenović's follower, was from Vrbava.

== Notable individuals ==
- Melentije Pavlović
