= Šutci =

Coordinates: 44.2667°N 20.3564°E

- Village (Selo)
- Interactive map of Šutci
- Country: Serbia
- District: Kolubara District
- Municipality: Ljig
- Time zone: UTC+1 (CET)
  - Summer (DST): UTC+2 (CEST)

Šutci is a village situated in Ljig municipality in Serbia.

The village was active in the Serbian Revolution, being organized into the knežina (administrative unit) of Kačer during the First Serbian Uprising (1804–13). Marko, a follower of vojvoda Arsenije Loma, came from Šutci.
