= Živkovci =

- Village (Selo)
- Location within Serbia
- Coordinates: 44°17′N 20°26′E
- Country: Serbia
- District: Kolubara District
- Municipality: Ljig
- Time zone: UTC+1 (CET)
  - Summer (DST): UTC+2 (CEST)

Živkovci is a village situated in Ljig municipality in Serbia.

The village was active in the Serbian Revolution, being organized into the knežina (administrative unit) of Kačer during the First Serbian Uprising (1804–13). Among revolutionaries from the village were knez Živan Stojanović, Petar Petrović-Kepić and Petronije Đokić.
