= Sima Paštrmac =

Serbian revolutionary

Sima Milosavljević (Serbian: Сима Милосављевић; 1776–5 August 1836), known by the demonym Paštramac or Paštrmac (Паштрмац), and nickname Amidža (Turkish for "uncle"), was a participant in the First Serbian Uprising and Second Serbian Uprising. As a constant companion of Prince Miloš Obrenović, he was his secretary and manager of the court in Kragujevac. The only preserved konak from the palace complex in Kragujevac is named after his second nickname - Amidžin konak. The house in which he lived is located in Svetozara Markovića Street, which used to be named - Paštrmčeva.

Milosavljević was born in the village of Paštrmi near Ramaća in 1776.

At the time of the First Serbian Uprising, he was a standard-bearer with Duke Antonije Ristić-Pljakić. During Hadži-Prodan's rebellion in 1814, he joined the rebels. He surrendered together with Toma Vučić-Perišić, after negotiations with Miloš Obrenović.

In Takovo, he received a flag from Miloš Obrenović, during the announcement of the Second Serbian Uprising, and thus became Miloš's standard-bearer. As a great friend of the prince, he was his advisor, the manager of the court in Kragujevac, the Boluk-bashi of Miloš's boys, and from February 1835 he was appointed court adviser.

Sima Milosavljević-Paštramac died on 5 August 1836 in Kragujevac.

== See also ==
- List of Serbian Revolutionaries
