= Rudnik (mountain) =

Mountain in Serbia

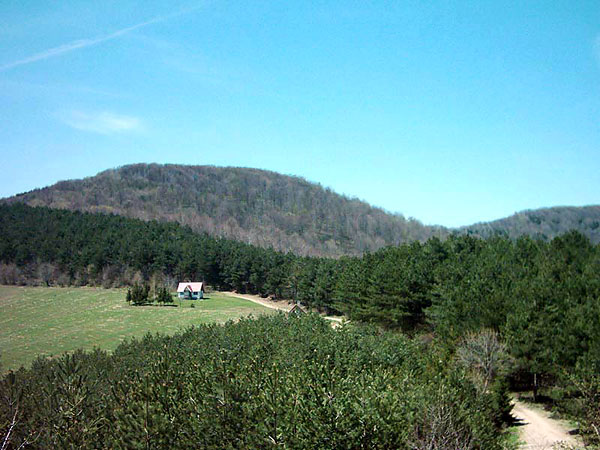

Highest point
- Elevation: 1,132 m (3,714 ft)
- Coordinates: 44°07′53″N 20°32′25″E

Geography
- Location within Serbia
- Location: Central Serbia
- Parent range: Dinaric Alps

Rudnik (Serbian Cyrillic: Рудник, pronounced [rûːdniːk]) is a mountain in central Serbia, near the town of Gornji Milanovac. Its highest peak, Cvijićev vrh, named after geologist and biologist Jovan Cvijić, has an elevation of 1,132 meters above sea level. It has several other peaks over 1000 m: Srednji Šturac, Mali Šturac, Molitve, Paljevine and Marijanac. Rudnik literally means 'mine' in Serbian, apparently referring to the mountain's rich mineral resources. The name is probably a testament to the mining activity associated with the mountain throughout several millennia.

== History ==
The archaeological site of Belovode on the Rudnik mountain contains the world's oldest reliably dated evidence of copper smelting at high temperature, from 5,000 BCE.

Before the arrival of the Romans, the area was inhabited by the Illyrians, followed by the Celts. The first Serbian dinar with Cyrillic inscription, the dinar of Stefan Dragutin of Serbia, was minted at Rudnik. The Saxons and the people of Dubrovnik had colonies in this region in the 14th century. After 1441, Rudnik gained special importance when the Ottoman Empire conquered mines of Novo Brdo further south. Đurađ Branković, the revered Serbian despot, had a mint and summer villa here. The rich mineral resources of the mountain (silver, lead and copper) were an important source of wealth to the Serbian rulers. Besides mining, Rudnik was a settlement with developed handicrafts and a thriving trading post with a cosmopolitan population that influenced the whole of Serbia.

On the top of the Ostrovica hill lie the remains of a fortified city, whose exact origins are unknown. It was first mentioned in the fifth century CE, but is presumed to originate from the Antiquity and that Romans reconstructed it. In the medieval Serbia, Ostrovica was one of the most important fortresses in this part of the state. It was recorded that when a 1321 civil war regarding succession of king Stefan Milutin broke out between his son Stefan Dečanski and nephew Stefan Vladislav II, the city accepted refugees from the surrounding areas, including miners and merchants from Dubrovnik. In this period, Ostrovica was on the Belgrade-Dubrovnik trade route, which in this section included modern Lazarevac–Belanovica–Ostrovica–Rudnik–Gornji Milanovac path.

In 1398, rebellious vojvoda Novak Belockrvić, who tried to oust ruling prince Stefan Lazarević, fled to the fortress. Ostrovica was refortified by despot Đurađ Branković around 1430, who used it as a summer retreat with his family. The popular legend attributed the city building to his wife Eirene Kantakouzene, already infamous for her role in building of the Smederevo Fortress, so the fortress is today referred to as Jerinin Grad (Eirene's City), even though it is much older.

Though deemed indomitable, Ostrovica was conquered by the Ottoman sultan Murad II in 1436. The Ottomans withdrew later, but reconquered Ostrovica in 1454, and demolished it. The fortress was restored again and assumed its trade importance, becoming a station on the merchant caravan route to Žrnov, fortress on the Avala mountain, just south of Belgrade. The Ottomans called Ostrovica Sivirce Hisar ("Peak Citadel"). It deteriorated in time. When Austro-Hungarian traveler Felix Philipp Kanitz visited Ostrovica in 1888, he climbed to the top and described a "high placed castle". He published his findings in 1904.

== Mining ==
In connection with the mining process, an artificial lake was formed in the village of Majdan. In 1953 a tailings dam was built in order to accumulate the byproducts. It separates the flotation reservoir from the valley of the Despotovica river, which flows through the town of Gornji Milanovac (8 km (5.0 mi) downstream), and from the Ibar Highway. The dam was built on the small stream of Rudnički potok. The lake is not open for public use. It is 1,000 m (3,300 ft) long, 300 m (980 ft) wide and covers an area of 30 ha (74 acres). The tailings is a result of 264,000 tons of ore which is being treated yearly in the mine: lead, zinc, copper and traces of silver.

Considering the burst of the dam as a potential catastrophe, since the tailings would flood Gornji Milanovac, the dam has been upgraded in time. It is fit to survive an earthquake of the 9.0 magnitude on Richter scale. In 2013 devices for early notification in case of a quake were installed and are directly connected to the state seismology institute. During the major 2014 Southeast Europe floods, the lake accumulated additional 860.000 cubic metres (30,370.6 cubic feet) of water, which would otherwise flood the town. The flood wave from the slopes of the Rudnik was damped and effectively prolonged over five days instead of sweeping all at once. The treating apparatus allows for the clean water to be let through the dam into the Despotovica river. Several projects are being developed. In 2018 a new system for evacuation of the water in case of emergency will be installed, while by 2023 a new plant will be built which will further treat the wastewaters.

By 2017, the lead and zinc mine "Rudnik" became one of the most successful mining companies in Serbia, notable for exporting 100% of its products. In 2017 it was announced that the largest ore body in the history of the mine was discovered. With 400,000 tons of the colored metals ore, it will be enough for the exploitation of 5 years and should begin in 2019. It is a high quality ore, with the content of 6-10% of zinc, lead and silver.

== Nature ==
The Rudnik is covered in deciduous forest mainly consisting of beech trees. In total, there are some 650 plant species inhabiting the mountain, of which more than 100 are endemic or medicinal.

== Features ==
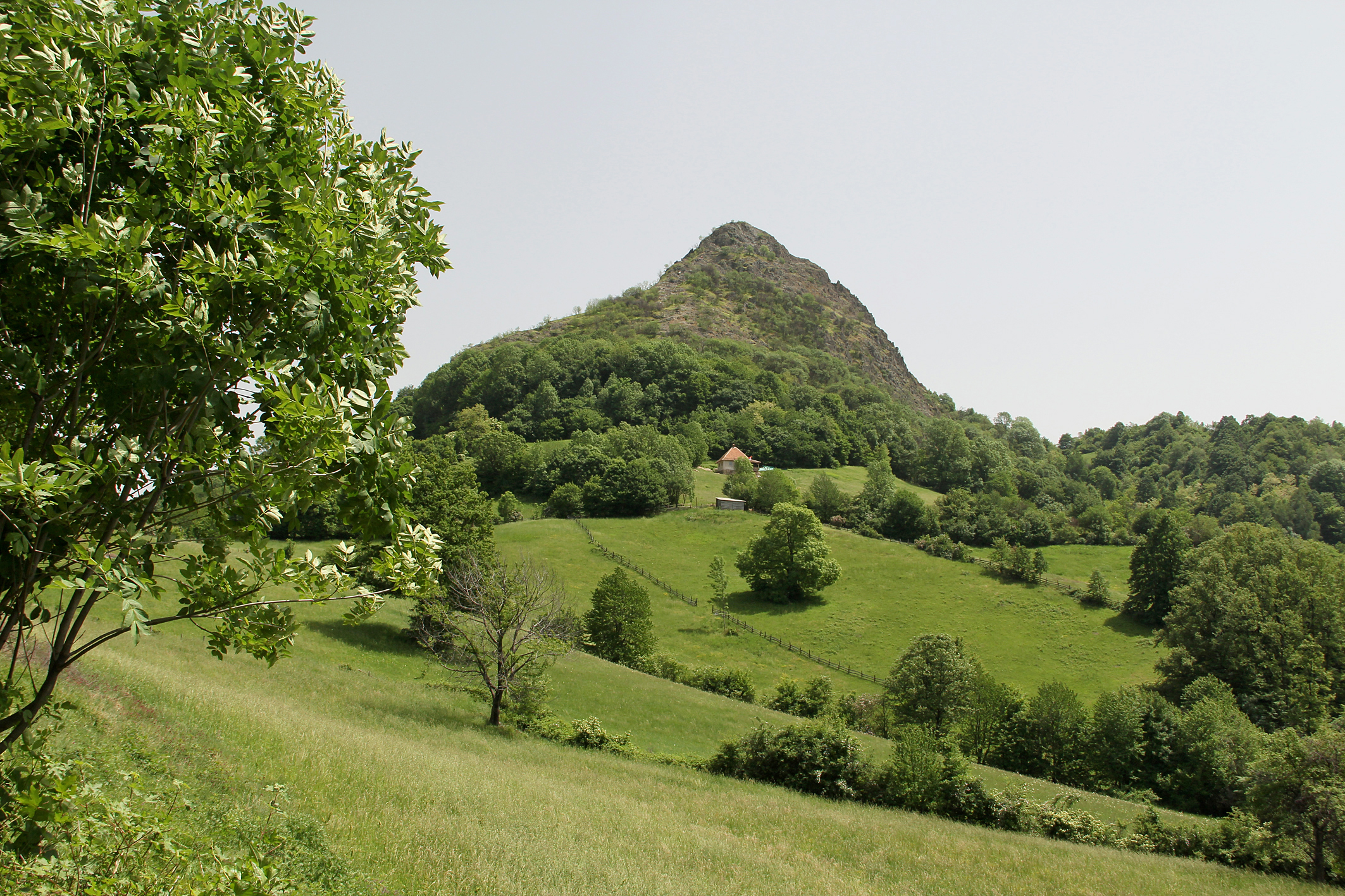
Ostrvica

Ostrovica (Serbian Cyrillic: Островица/Острвица, 44°10′08″N 20°27′37″E), is the northwestern extension of Rudnik's massif. The 758 m (2,487 ft) tall extinct volcano sharply rises above the surrounding terrain, though the top is easily accessible, and has a specific morphological physiognomy compared to its surroundings. Being of volcanic origin, it is part of the wider eruptive region of Šumadija. With the surrounding ZagrađeTrudelj area, Ostrovica makes one volcanic massif. It is made of magmatic rocks, chiefly quartz latite and dacite (andesite), suitable for masonry and road building. The peak is today a barren rocky ground, partially covered with shrubs, thorny bushes and rare grassy patches.

The remnants of the lava flows, which abruptly cooled and hardened, are still visible on the barren rocks. The top has two uneven peaks, or "teeth" (zubi). They are divided by the 10 m (33 ft) wide rift, which developed during the process of thick lava's corrugation, which created the neck. The same process formed the existing, spiked peak. First data on the petrography of Ostrovica's volcanic rocks were published in 1889 by Jovan Žujović, Serbian geology pioneer. In the past, volcanic activity in the area was intensive and covered much wider area. Volcanic activity was present during the entire geological history of the region, until it stopped in the late Tertiary, around 2 million years ago. Remains of this activity is the whole array of igneous rocks found in central Serbia: andesite, dacite, trachyte, rhyolite, peridotite, granite, gabbro, pegmatite, basalt, diabase, etc.

Ostrovica is within the vegetation zone of oak forests, specifically the Hungarian oak-Austrian oak zone. On the rocky slopes there are habitats of purple saxifrage, and some Balkan-Carpathian endemic plants, like Reichenbach's yellow iris and certain species of chickweed.

After the motion of the Institute for Nature Conservation of Serbia, the Ostrovica was protected locally by the municipality Gornji Milanovac in 1980 as the "Viewpoint Ostrovica". After the 2009 revision of the protection, Ostrovica was declared a Natural Monument Ostrovica. It covers an area of almost 14 ha (35 acres) and is completely located in the area of the Zagrađe village.

== See also ==
- List of mountains in Serbia
