= Ramaća =

Ramaća Рамаћа (Serbian)
- Village
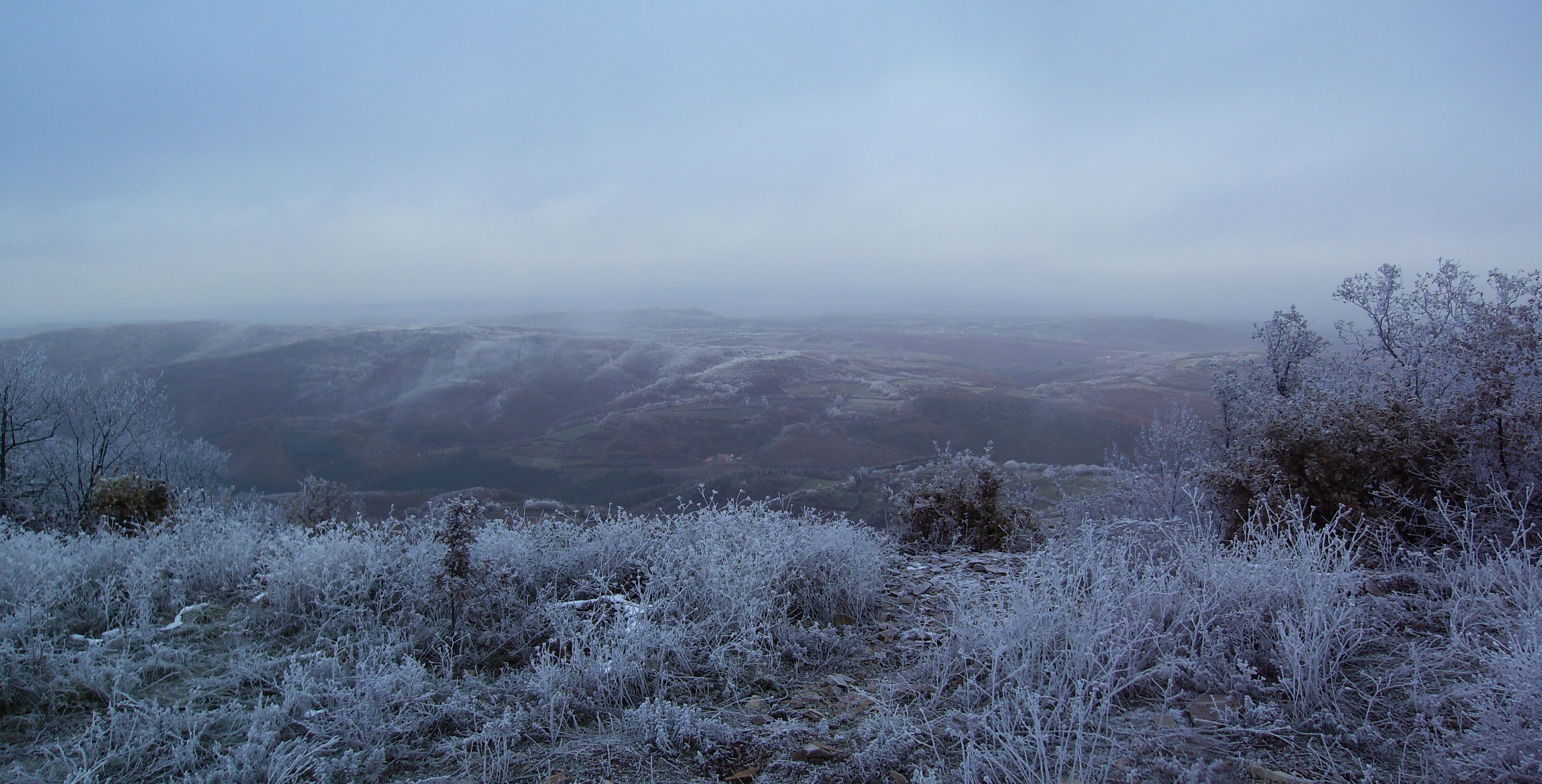
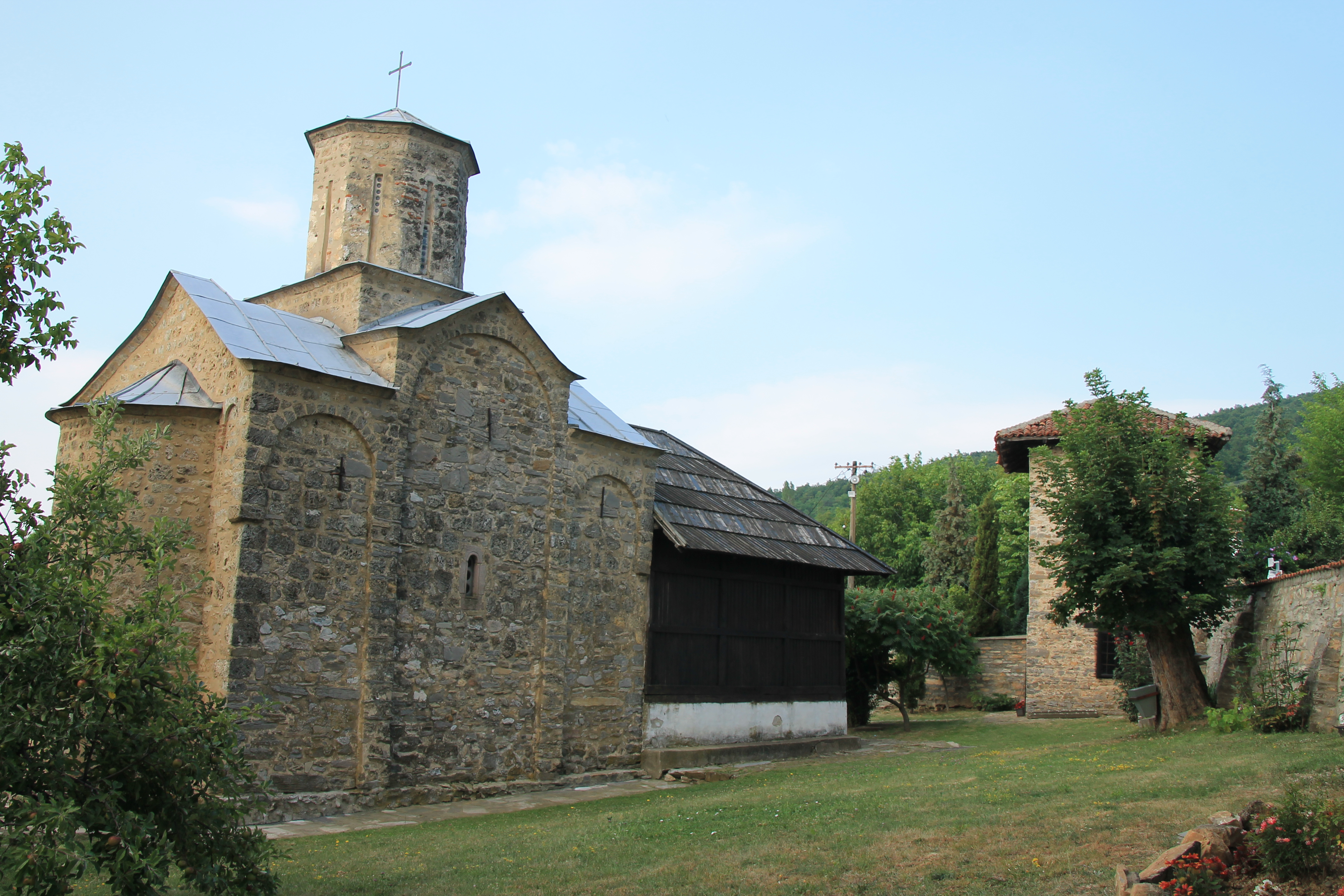
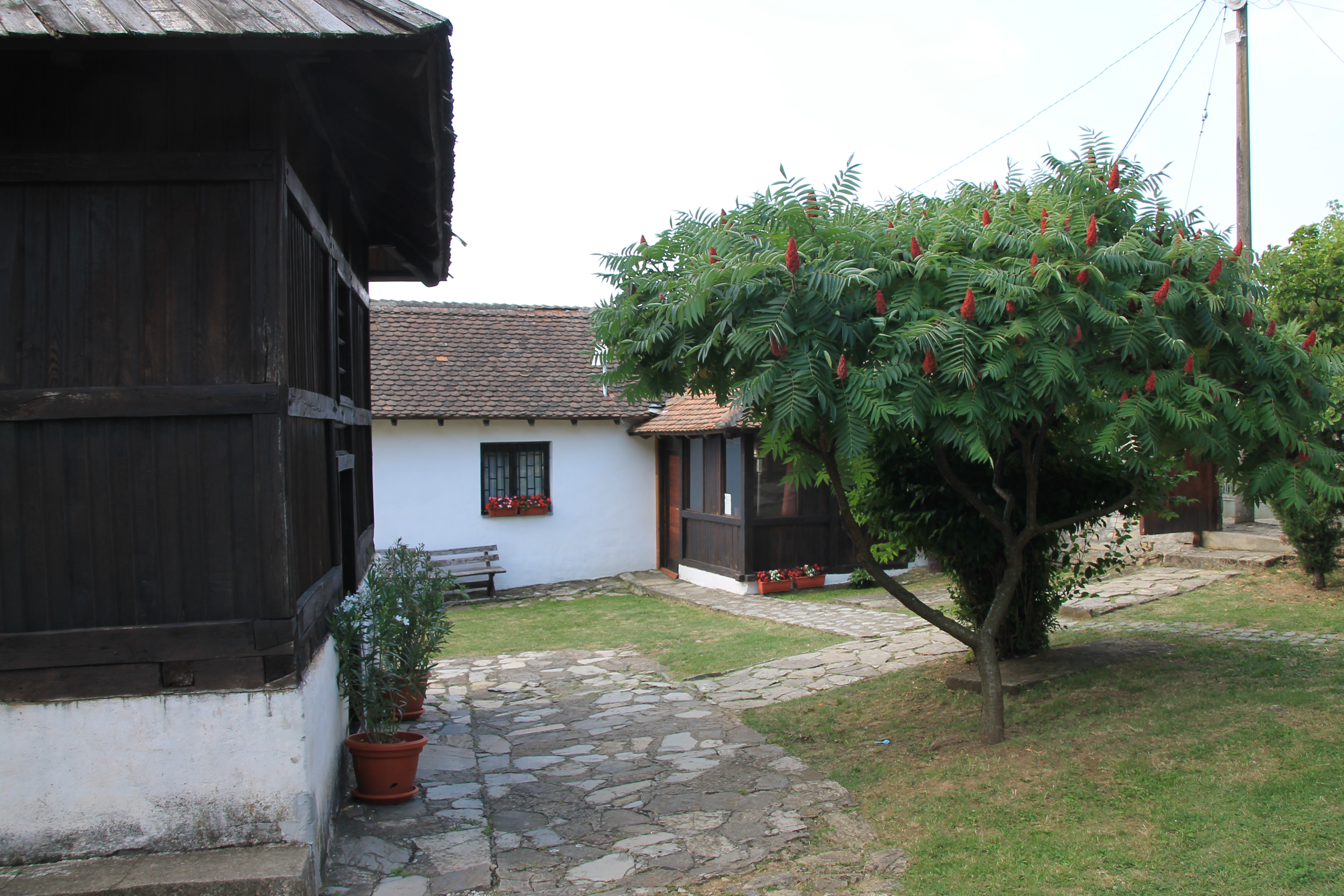

- Location within Serbia
- Coordinates: 44°05′N 20°41′E
- Country: Serbia
- District: Šumadija District
- Municipality: Stragari

Population (2002)
  - Total: 340
- Time zone: UTC+1 (CET)
  - Summer (DST): UTC+2 (CEST)

Ramaća (Serbian: Рамаћа) is a village in the municipality of Stragari, Serbia. According to the 2002 census, the village has a population of 340 people.
