= Ugrinovci, Gornji Milanovac =

Ugrinovci Угриновци
- Village
- Interactive map of Ugrinovci
- Location within Serbia
- Coordinates: 44°10′21″N 20°23′16″E
- Country: Serbia
- District: Moravica District
- Municipality: Gornji Milanovac

Population (2002)
  - Total: 480
- Time zone: UTC+1 (CET)
  - Summer (DST): UTC+2 (CEST)

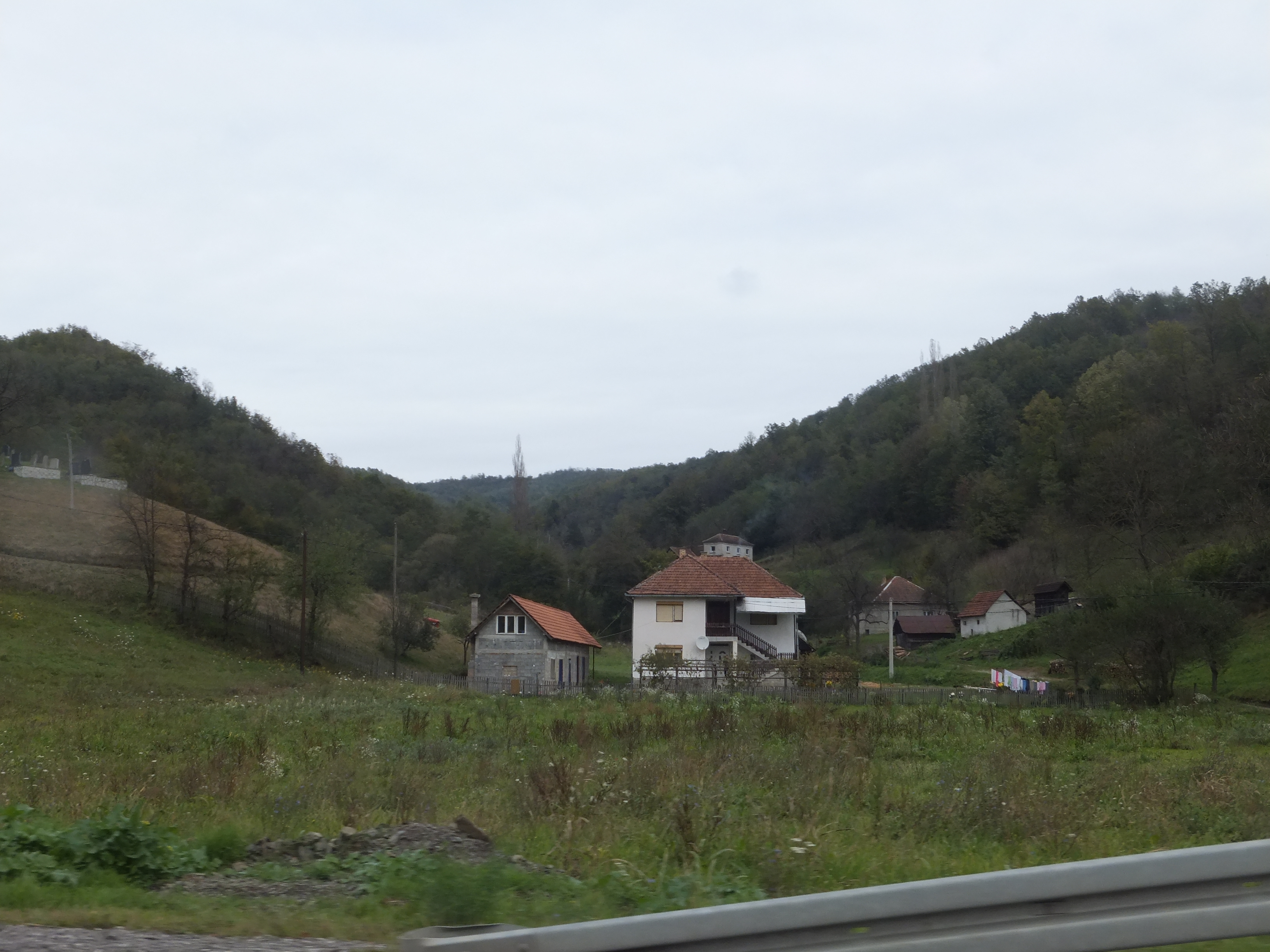
Ugrinovci village

Ugrinovci is a village in the municipality of Gornji Milanovac, Serbia. According to the 2002 census, the village has a population of 480 people.

The village was active in the Serbian Revolution, being organized into the knežina (administrative unit) of Kačer during the First Serbian Uprising (1804–13). Among revolutionaries from the village were Nikola Mitrović and Jevto Vulićević.
