= Dobrica Erić =

Serbian writer and poet (1936–2019)

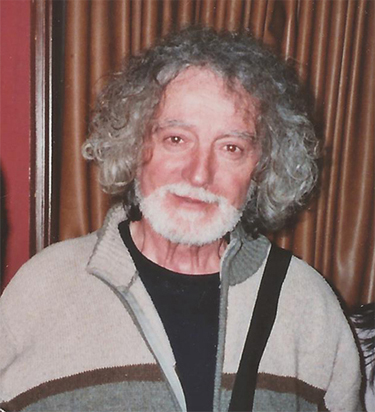
- Erić in 2005
- Born: 22 August 1936; Donja Crnuća, Kingdom of Yugoslavia
- Died: 29 March 2019 (aged 82); Belgrade, Serbia
- Occupations: Writer, Comics writer
- Writing career
- Period: 1959–2019

Dobrica Erić (Serbian Cyrillic: Добрица Ерић; 22 August 1936 – 29 March 2019) was a Serbian writer and poet.

== Biography ==
Erić completed 4 years of elementary school, and for a period of time worked as a manual laborer. His poetry for kids and adults was inspired by the rural environment and slow pace of life.

He is the author of numerous novels, five books of romantic poetry, 23 poetry books, 5 theatre dramas and over 40 children's books. He was a "deserved creator" of the city of Belgrade. His first book of poetry was published in 1959.

His works have been translated into numerous languages. He lived and worked in Belgrade and Gruža.

== Works ==
- 1959. Svet u Suncokretu
- 1965. Vašar u Topoli
- 1966. Stari seljački kalendar
- 1968. Slavuj i sunce
- 1969. Ogrlica od grlica – Kulturni Centar, Novi sad
- 1973. Torta sa pet spratova
- 1975. Pesma o svicima
- 1976. Dolina suncokreta
- 1977. Večni kratkovečnici
- 1978. Slavuj i sunce – IRO. Mladost, Zagreb
- 1979. Bašta sa sedam ruža
- 1980. Sricanje žene
- 1980. Leto u Kalipolju – IRO. Veselin Masleša, Sarajevo
- 1980. Čardak između četiri jabuke
- 1982. Moj drug, Milivojčićev lug
- 1985. Sunčeva verenica
- 1987. Tako žubori reka
- 1988. Pismo kraljici cveća – Rad, Beograd
- 1989. Roždestvo ratarevo
- 1989. Krunisanje
- 1990. Bunar za prijatelje
- 1991. Puževa srma
- 1991. Ekološki bukvar
- 1992. San Gružanske letnje noći
- 1993. Jezero Ježeva bara
- 1993. U vatri bismo, ne izgorismo
- 1993. Plači voljena zemljo
- 1999. Razapeta zemlja
- 1999. Vilina Dolina
- 2002. Pusti puže rogove – IP. Rad, Beograd
- 2002. Krunisanje – IP. Rad, Beograd
- 2005. Deca sa zlatom lipe u kosi
- 2008 Priča iz mravljeg sveta, Kreativni centar
- 2012 Peta strana sveta, Pčelica
- 2013 Bajka o caru pčelaru, Pčelica
- 2013 Brojanice iz Gračanice, Catena Mundi
- 2014 Cica Mica Čačkalica, Pčelica
- 2015 Blago voća i povrća, Kreativni centar
- 2019 Naša gošća godina, Kreativni centar

== Sources ==
- Slobodan Ivkov: 60 godina domaćeg stripa u Srbiji (1935–1995), Galerija "Likovni susret", Subotica, 1995. E-version: Projekat Rastko
- Borisav Čeliković, „Stripografija edicije Nikad robom“, Dani stripa '95., „Dečje novine“, Gornji Milanovac, 1995.
- Borisav Čeliković, „Četiri decenije stripa Dečjih novina“ Dani stripa '95., „Dečje novine“, Gornji Milanovac, 1995.
