= Duško Radović =

Serbian writer (1922–1984)

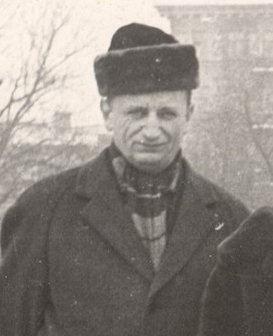
- Radović in Kiev, 1966
- Born: Dušan Radović; 29 November 1922; Niš, Kingdom of Serbs, Croats and Slovenes
- Died: 16 August 1984 (aged 61); Belgrade, Socialist Republic of Serbia, Socialist Federal Republic of Yugoslavia
- Resting place: Belgrade New Cemetery
- Occupations: Writer, journalist

Dušan "Duško" Radović (Serbian Cyrillic: Душан Душко Радовић, pronounced [dǔʃan dûʃko râːdoʋitɕ]; 29 November 1922 – 16 August 1984) was a Serbian writer, journalist, aphorist and a poet.

== Biography ==
He was known for his poetry (especially children's poetry), books, television screenplays, and for his aphorisms. He was the editor in chief of "Pionirske novine", editor of Children's programme on Radio Belgrade and Radio-Television Belgrade, editor of the children's magazine "Poletarac", journalist at the Borba newspaper. From 1975 onwards he was the editor of radio Studio B. An athletic race "Remembering Duško Radović" was held in Belgrade for many years. Duško's brother is well-known athletic trainer Branimir "Brana" Radović. His works have been translated into all major world languages. Radović is the recipient of the most notable awards: Neven (Calendula), Mlado pokolenje (Young Generation), the award of Zmaj Children Games, the award of Sterijino pozorje, Seventh of July award, and the scroll of honour of the Hans Christian Andersen International Organization of Children's Literature.

== Selected works ==
- "Kapetan Džon Piplfoks" (Captain John Peoplefox) (1953), radio drama
- Poštovana deco (Honourable Children) (1954), poems
- Smešne reči (Funny Words) (1961), poems
- Pričam ti priču (A Tale to Tell) (1963), poems and stories
- Na slovo, na slovo (I Spy With My Little Eye) (1963–1965), television serial
- Če, tragedija koja traje (Che, A Tragedy that Perseveres) (1969. with M. Bećković), epic
- Vukova azbuka (Vuk's Alphabet) (1971), poems
- Zoološki vrt (The Zoo) (1972), poems
- Beograde, dobro jutro 1 (Good Morning, Belgrade, 1) (1977), aphorisms
- Beograde, dobro jutro 2 (Good Morning, Belgrade, 2) (1981), aphorisms
- Ponedeljak, Utorak, Sreda, Četvrtak (Monday, Tuesday, Wednesday, Thursday), poetry and prose for children in four volumes
- Beograde, dobro jutro 3 (Good Morning, Belgrade, 3) (1984), aphorisms.

== Famous aphorisms ==
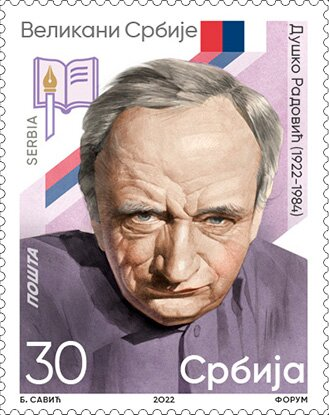
Radović on a 2022 stamp of Serbia

- "Parents, spank your kids as soon as you notice that they resemble you."
- "It is difficult to be a kid and to be good."
- "If you solve all of your kids' problems, they will have no other problem than you."
- "To have friends means to accept that there are more beautiful, smarter, and better people than you. Those, who cannot accept that, have no friends."
