= Belanovica =

Belanovica Белановица
- village
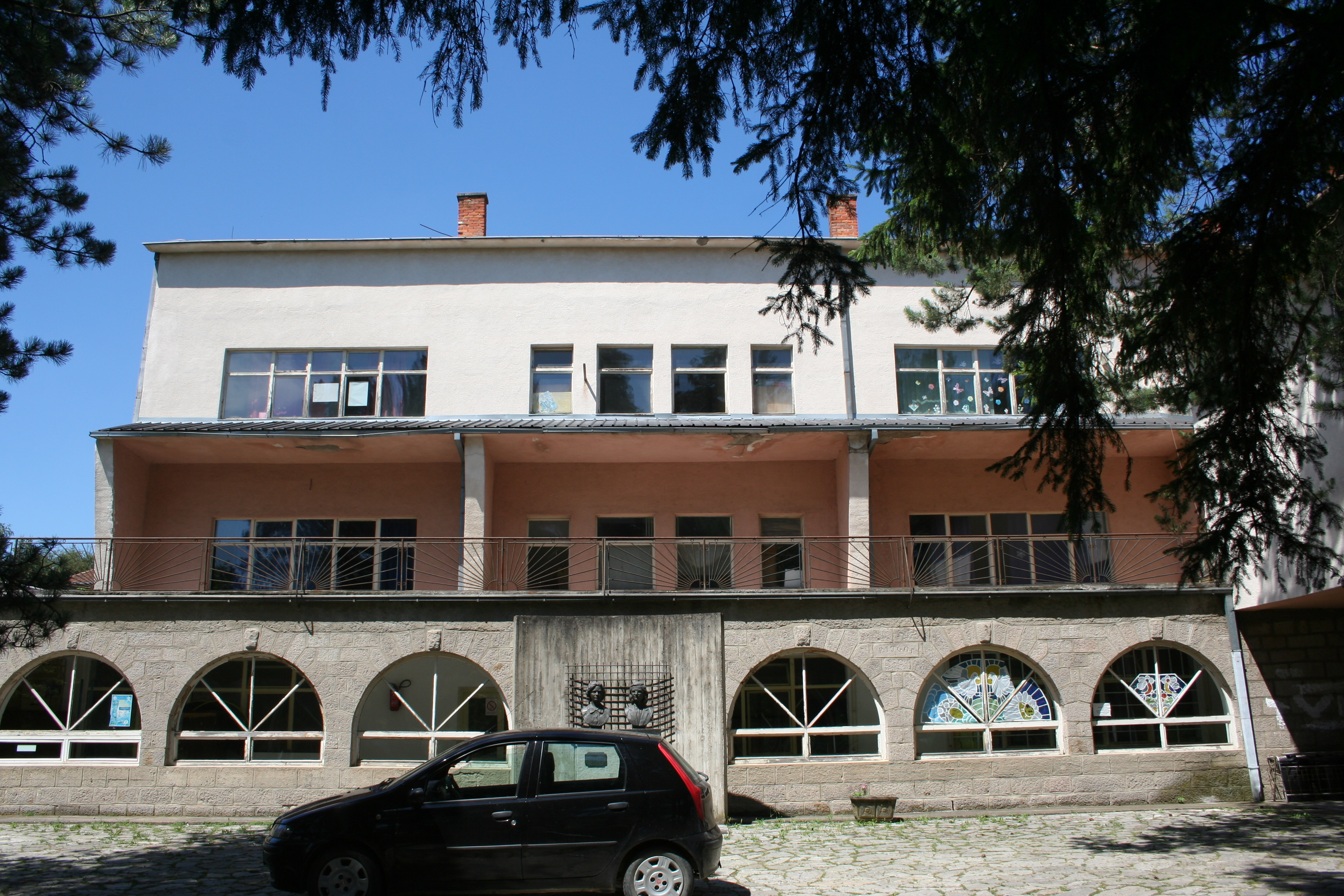

- Location within Serbia
- Coordinates: 44°14′51″N 20°23′48″E
- Country: Serbia
- District: Kolubara District
- Municipality: Ljig

Population (2011)
  - Total: 199
- Time zone: UTC+1 (CET)
  - Summer (DST): UTC+2 (CEST)
- Postal code: 14246
- Area code: 014
- Vehicle registration: VA
- Website: belanovica.rs

Belanovica (Serbian Cyrillic: Белановица) is a village in Serbia. It is located in the Ljig municipality, in the Kolubara District. The population of the village is 199 people (2011 census). Its geographical coordinates are 44° 14' 51" North, 20° 23' 48" East.
