= Antonije Ristić-Pljakić =

Antonije Ristić (Serbian Cyrillic: Антоније Ристић; d. 1832), known as Pljakić (Пљакић), was a Serbian revolutionary commander (vojvoda) active in the First Serbian Uprising. He was a soldier and the son-in-law of supreme leader Karađorđe.

== Early life ==
Antonije Ristić was born in Kamenica in Šumadija.

== Uprising ==
At the beginning of the First Serbian Uprising, during the conquest of Rudnik on 27–28 February 1804, Antonije killed the Karanovac (now Kraljevo) caravan müsellim (chief-of-police) at Pljakovo after which he was nicknamed Pljakić. In 1806 he married Karađorđe's eldest daughter Savka, with whom he had four sons and one daughter. As the vojvoda (commander) of Karanovac in 1813, he was also the commander-in-chief of the reserves and the vojvoda over the nahijas of Požega, Pazar, Kruševac and a knežina in Stari Vlah.

== Later life ==
In Karanovac, in the very trench named after him, he had a house in which he lived until the collapse of the First Serbian Uprising and the transition to Austria, and then to Russia, where he settled and later died on his way back to Serbia.

== See also ==
- List of Serbian Revolutionaries
- Sima Milosavljević-Paštramac

== Sources ==
- Arsić, Miroljub. "АНТОНИЈЕ РИСТИЋ ПЉАКИЋ - ВОЈВОДА КАРАНОВАЧКИ" (PDF). наша прошлост. 16.
- Hrabak, Bogumil (1959). "Живот у Карановцу за време Првог српског устанка" (PDF). Зборник Историјског музеја Србије. 1.
- Nenadović, Konstantin N. (1884). Живот и дела великог Ђорђа Петровића Кара-Ђорђа. Vol. II (1 ed.). Vienna: У Штампарији Јована Н. Вернаја – via Google Books.
- Nenadović, Konstantin N. (1903) [1883]. Живот и дела великог Ђорђа Петровића Кара-Ђорђа. Vol. I (2 ed.). Belgrade: Штампа Савића и Комп.
