= Miloš Obrenović House =

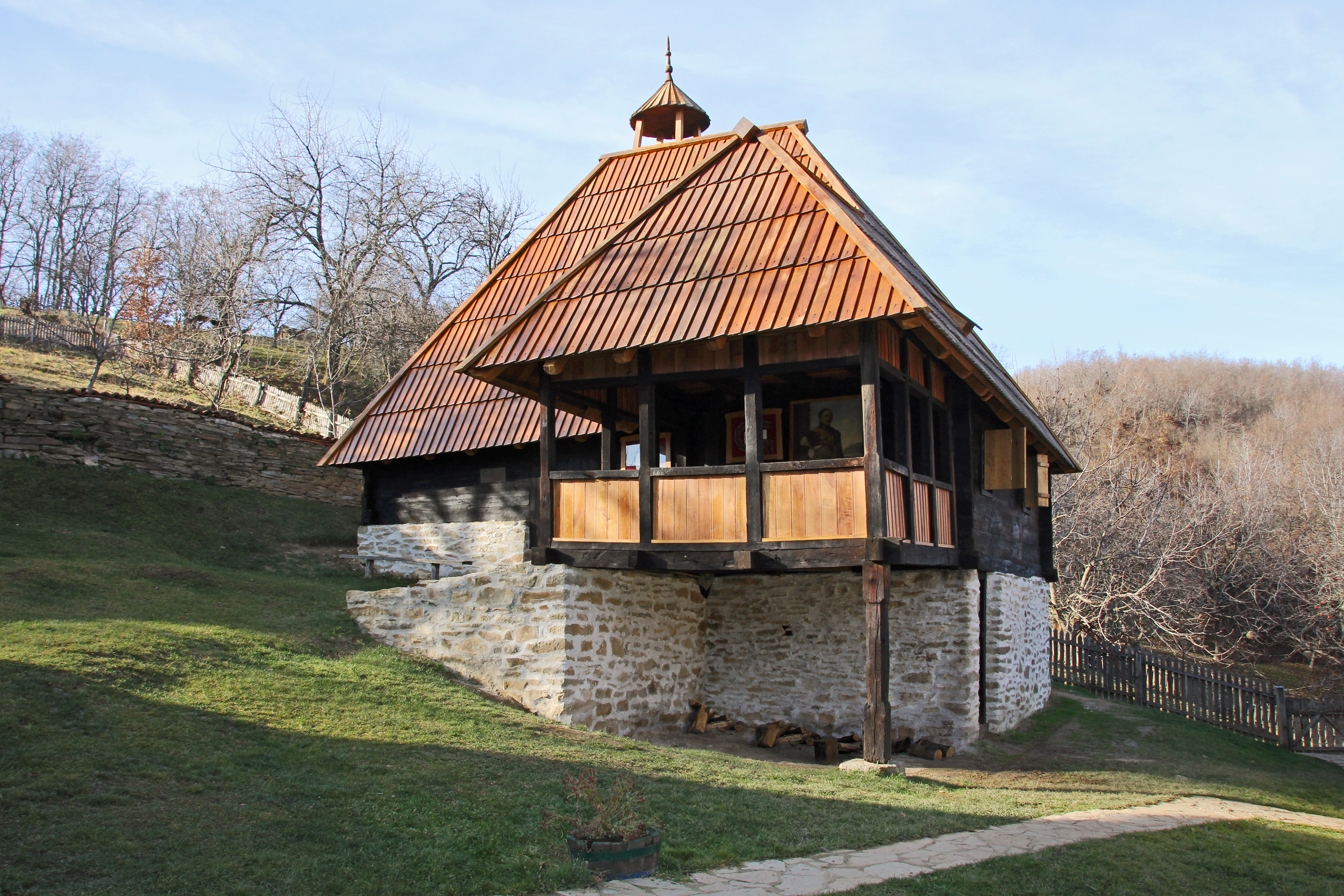
- Interactive map of the Miloš Obrenović House area

General information
- Type: Wooden house
- Location: Gornja Crnuća, Serbia
- Coordinates: 44°04′35″N 20°34′01″E
- Construction started: 1813

Cultural Heritage of Serbia
- Type: Monument of Culture of Exceptional Importance
- Designated: 5 November 1993
- Reference no.: SK 1078

Miloš's Residence in Gornja Crnuća (Милошев конак у Горњој Црнући) is an immovable cultural property and a Cultural Monument of Exceptional Importance located in the village of Gornja Crnuća, in the municipality of Gornji Milanovac, Serbia. The residence was built by Prince Miloš Obrenović on the estate of his stepfather, Radovan Marinković. The building is of significant historical importance as the site where the decision to launch the Second Serbian Uprising was made. The residence is currently managed by the Museum of Rudnik in Gornji Milanovac.

== Background and settlement ==
Following the failure of the First Serbian Uprising in 1813, Prince Miloš decided to remain in the country, relocating from the village of Brusnica. Seeking safety, he first moved his family to the Nikolje Monastery under the protection of Archimandrite Hadži-Atanasije.

After an unsuccessful attempt to secure Užice, Miloš and his family moved to a cave near the village of Šarani in the Takovo region, where they spent the autumn and early winter of 1813. They subsequently moved to the house of Đorđe Ljubičić at the foot of Kablar. In March 1814, while briefly living in the home of Đorđe Matković in Šarani, the family's fourth child, Jelisaveta (Savka), was born. Due to continued insecurity, Miloš eventually moved his family to the southeastern slopes of Mount Rudnik, specifically to the village of Gornja Crnuća.

== The Second Serbian Uprising ==
On Palm Sunday 1815, Prince Miloš emerged from this residence in his high-ranking military uniform, carrying the Serbian flag, and addressed the gathered people with the famous words: "Here I am, and here is war with the Turks."

Following the liberation, the residence served as the court and administrative center of free Serbia for several years. A significant rebel assembly was held in Gornja Crnuća on 19 December 1815, during which Miloš Obrenović was elected "Supreme Prince and Leader of the Serbian People." The assembly also appointed regional governors, members of the National Office, and established Serbia's first state budget.

Gornja Crnuća served as the temporary capital of Serbia from 1814 to 1818, until the capital was moved to Kragujevac. The nearby Vraćevšnica Monastery, founded by the medieval nobleman Radič Postupović, also played a major spiritual and political role during the uprising period.

== Architecture ==
The residence is a typical "Osaćanka" style log house, built on steep terrain. It is a two-part wooden structure consisting of a central room with a hearth (the "house"), a living room with a masonry stove, a cellar below the room, and an adjoining porch (doksat). The courtyard originally included auxiliary buildings such as a guest house (vajat), a summer house (čardak), a smokehouse, and a granary.

The steep, four-sided roof is made of wood with a high chimney and wide eaves, covered with wooden shingles (šindra).

== Permanent exhibition ==
The interior houses a permanent exhibition titled "The Serbian House in the First Half of the 19th Century." This reconstruction includes authentic household items from the Second Serbian Uprising period, copies of historical documents, photographic reproductions, and works of applied art.

== Gallery ==
,

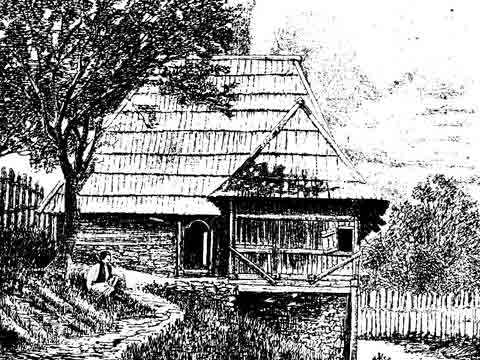
Miloš's Residence in the 1860s, sketched by Felix Kanitz.

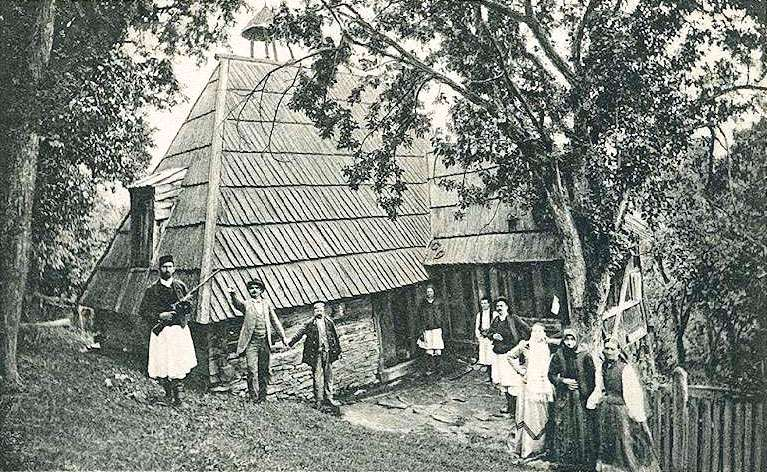
An excursion at the residence in 1910.

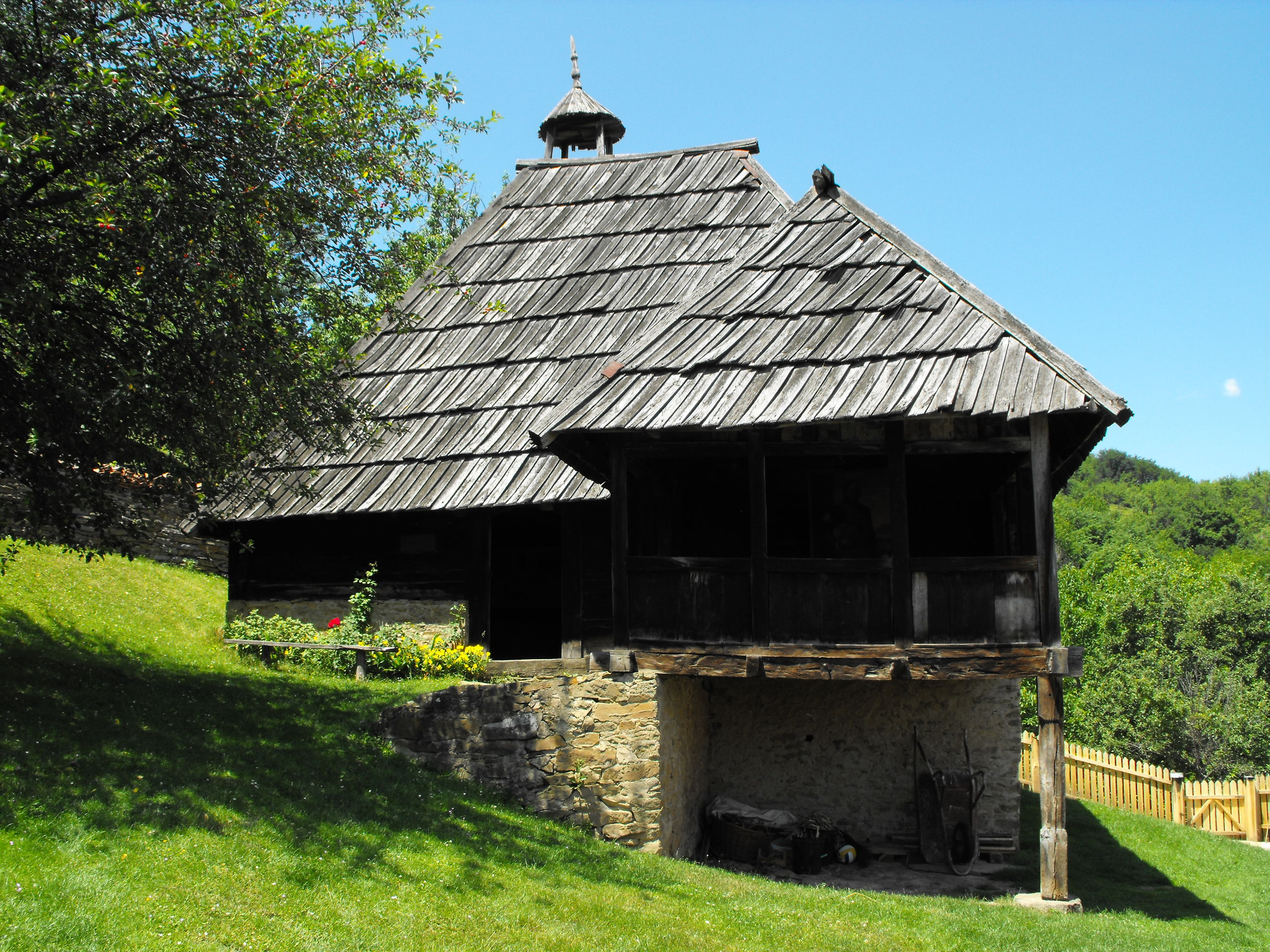
The residence in 2009, prior to restoration.

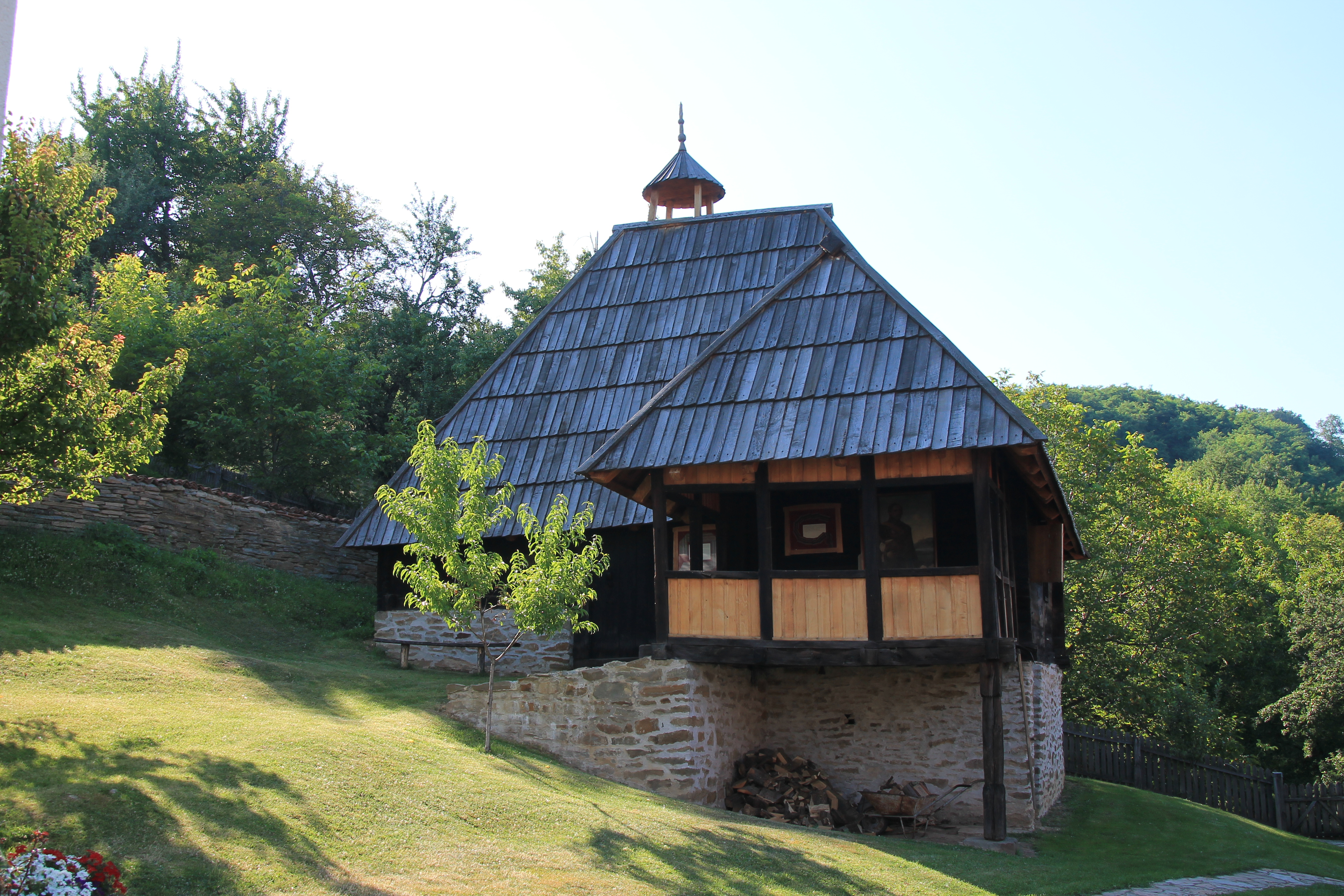
The residence in 2019.

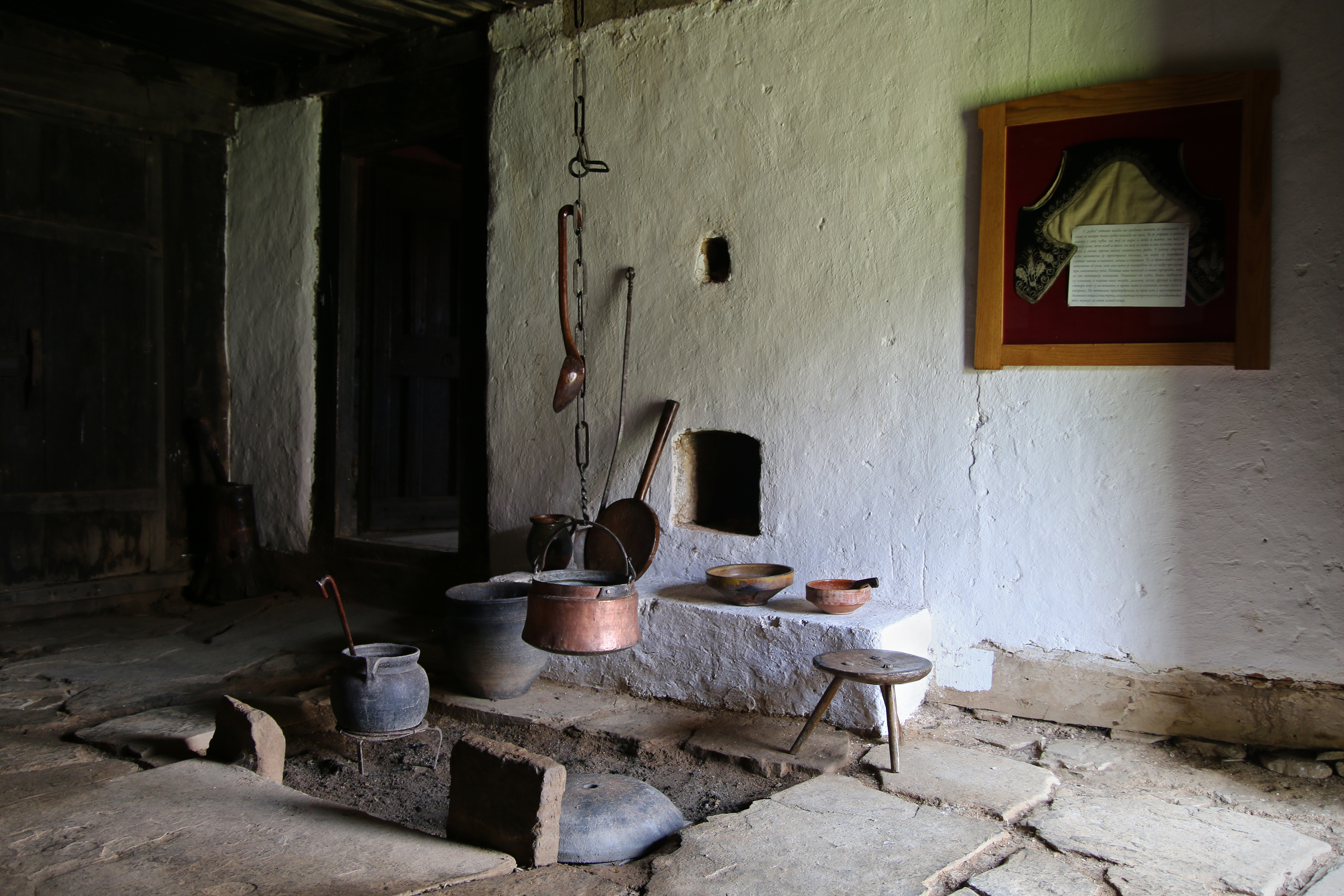

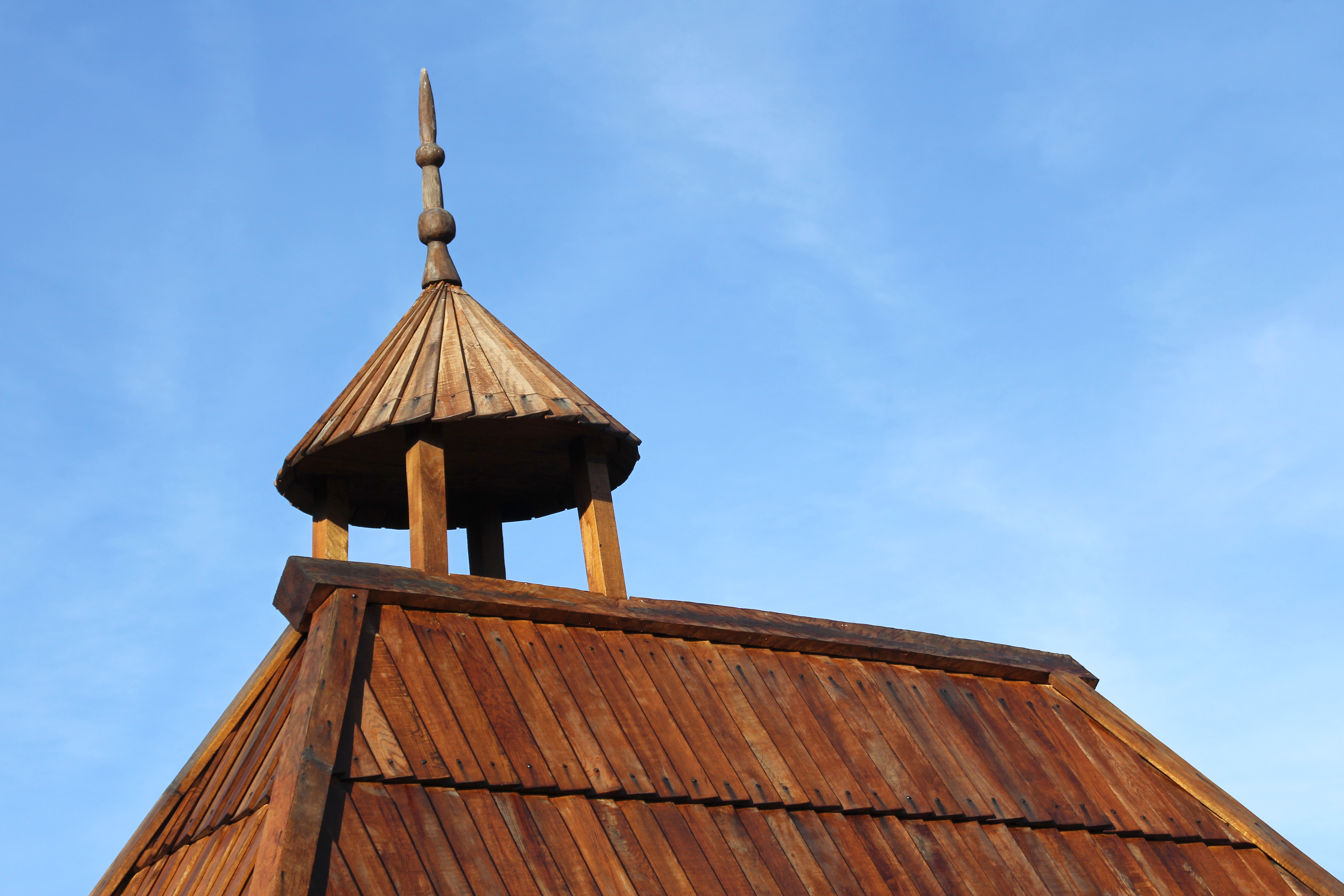

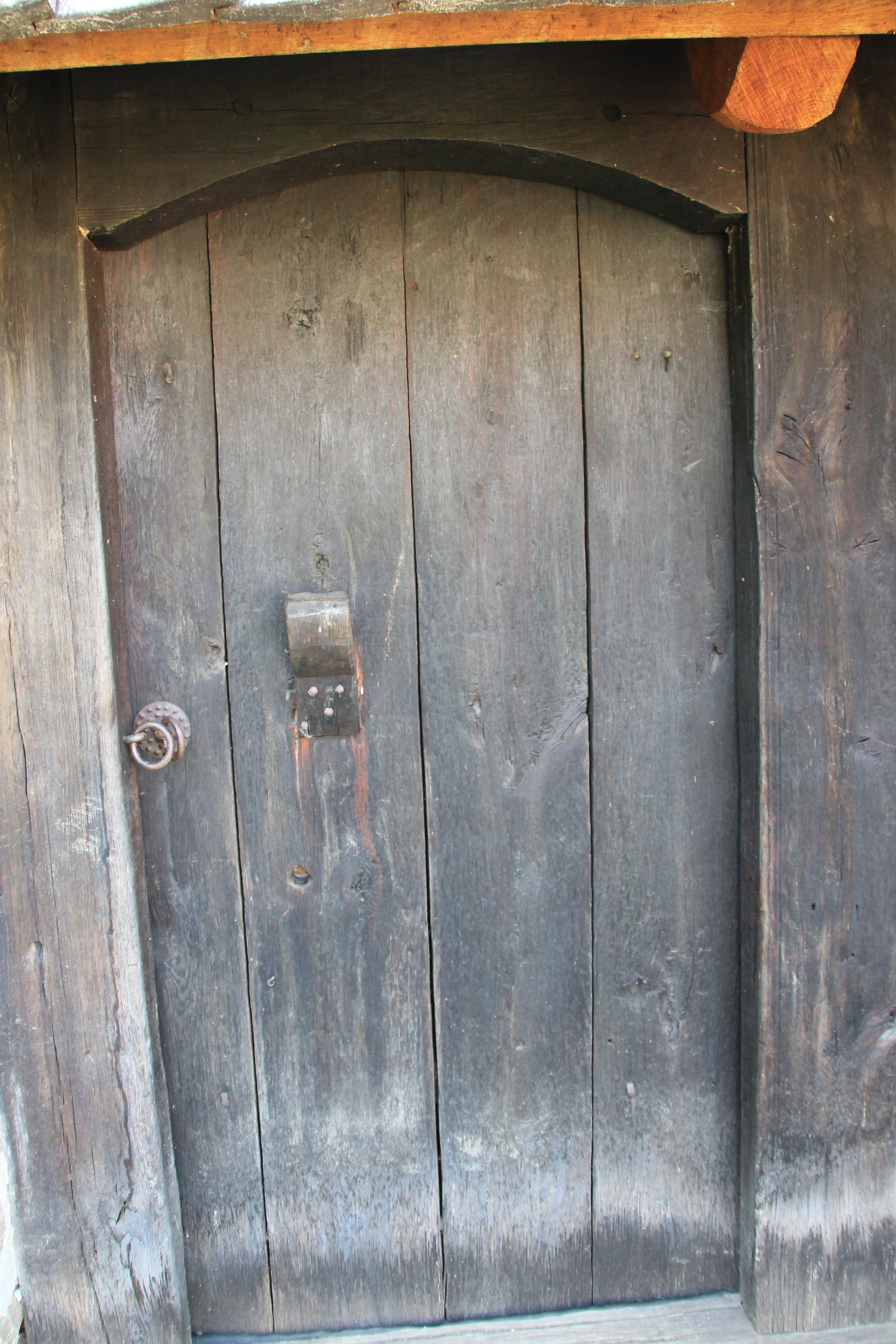

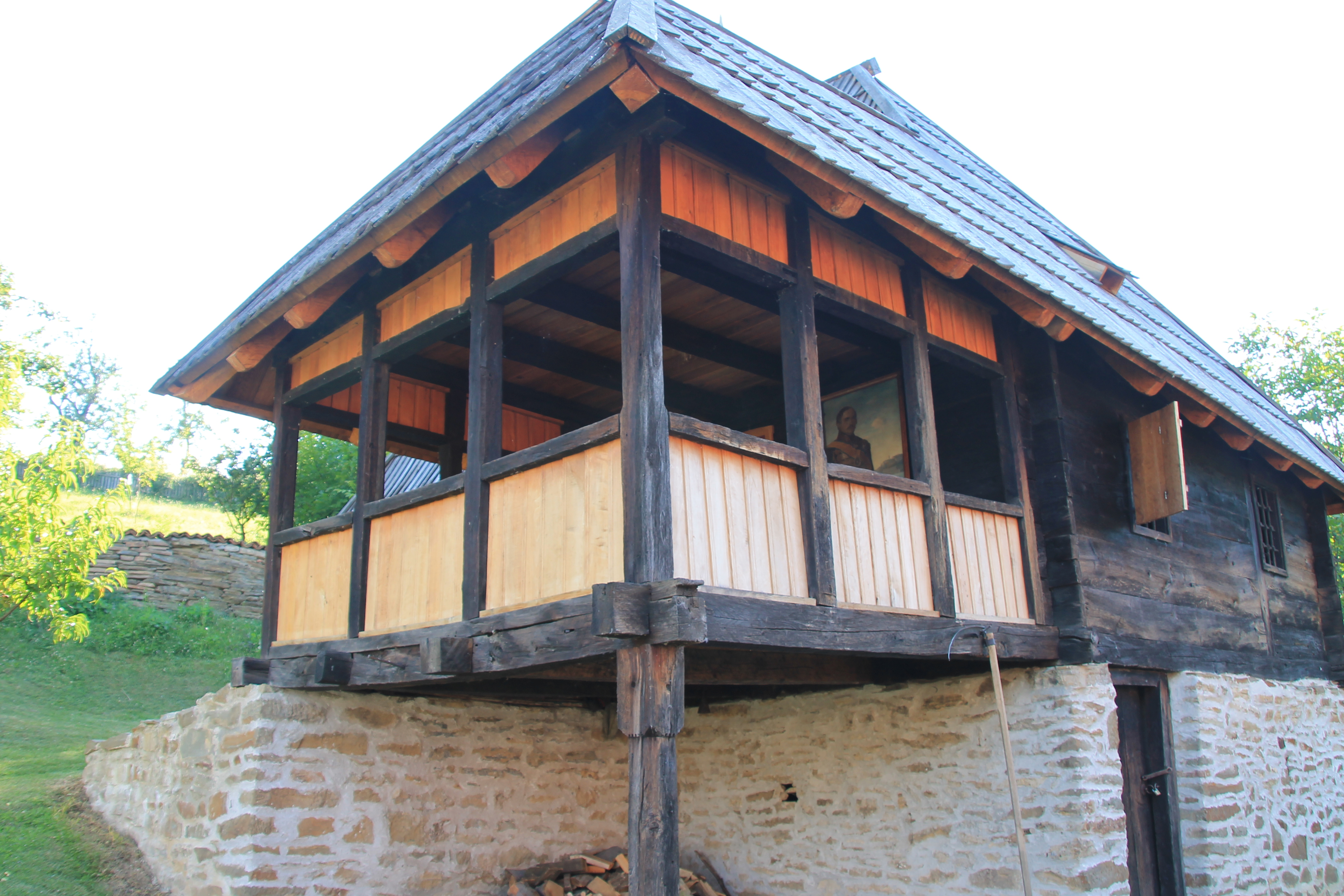

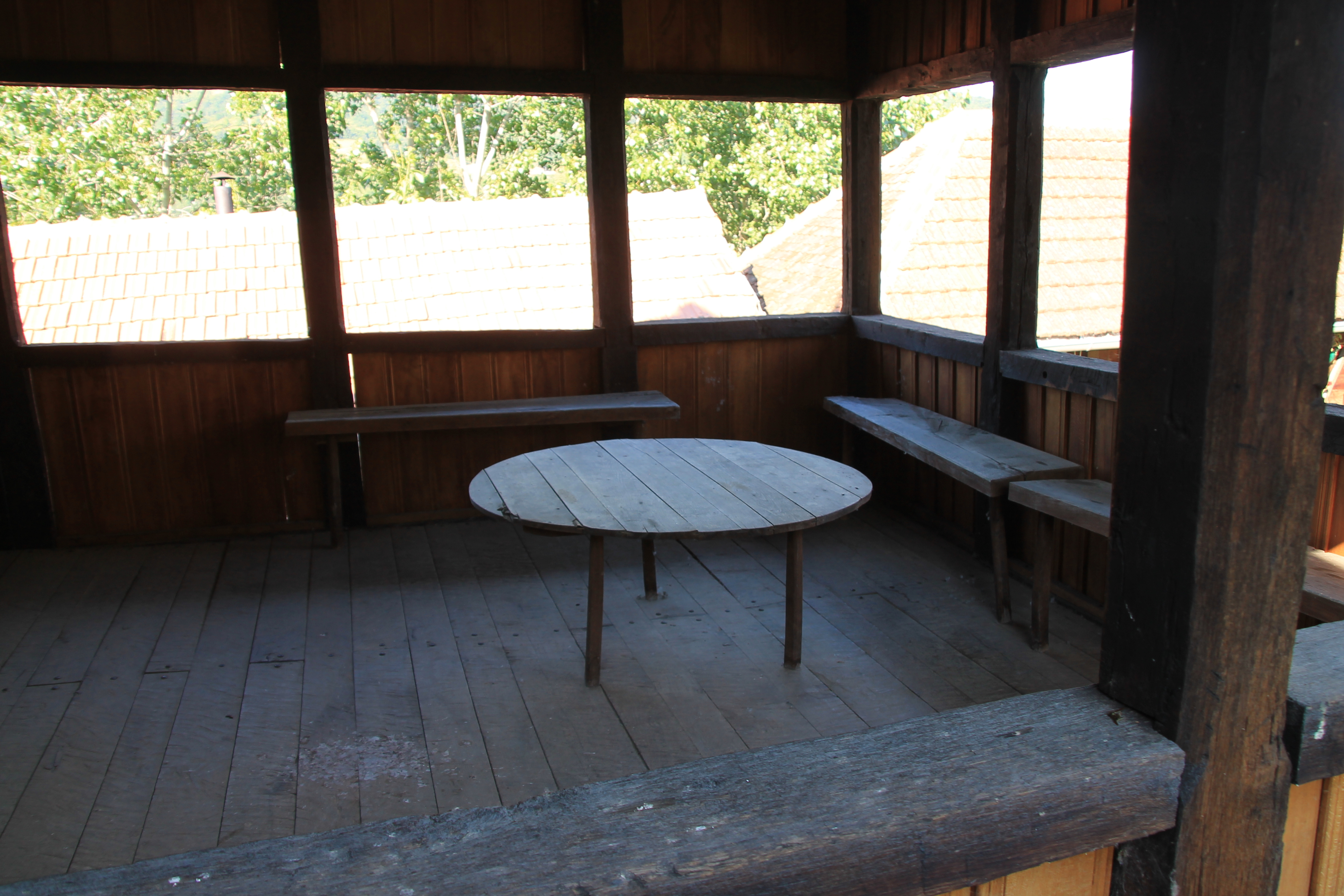

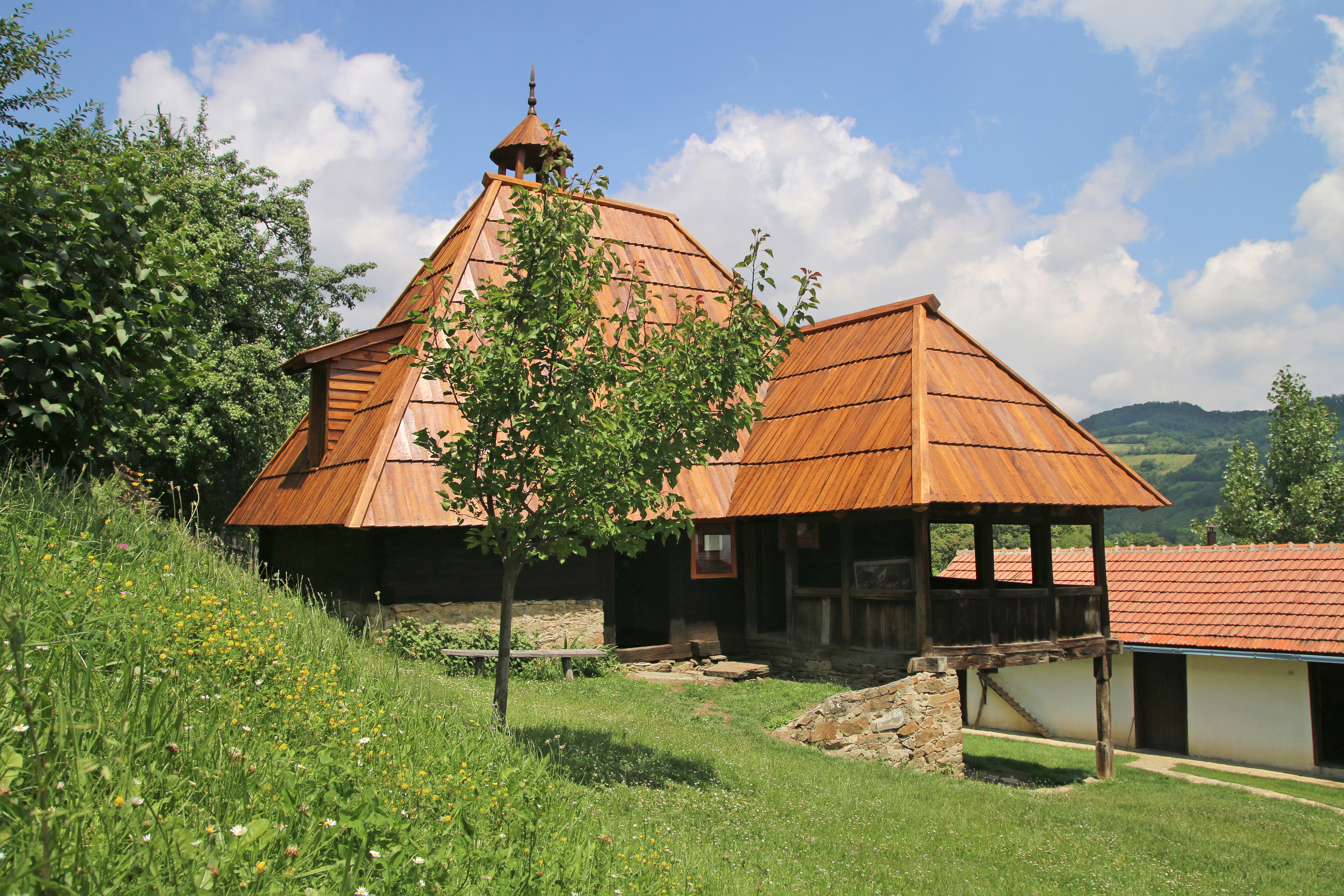

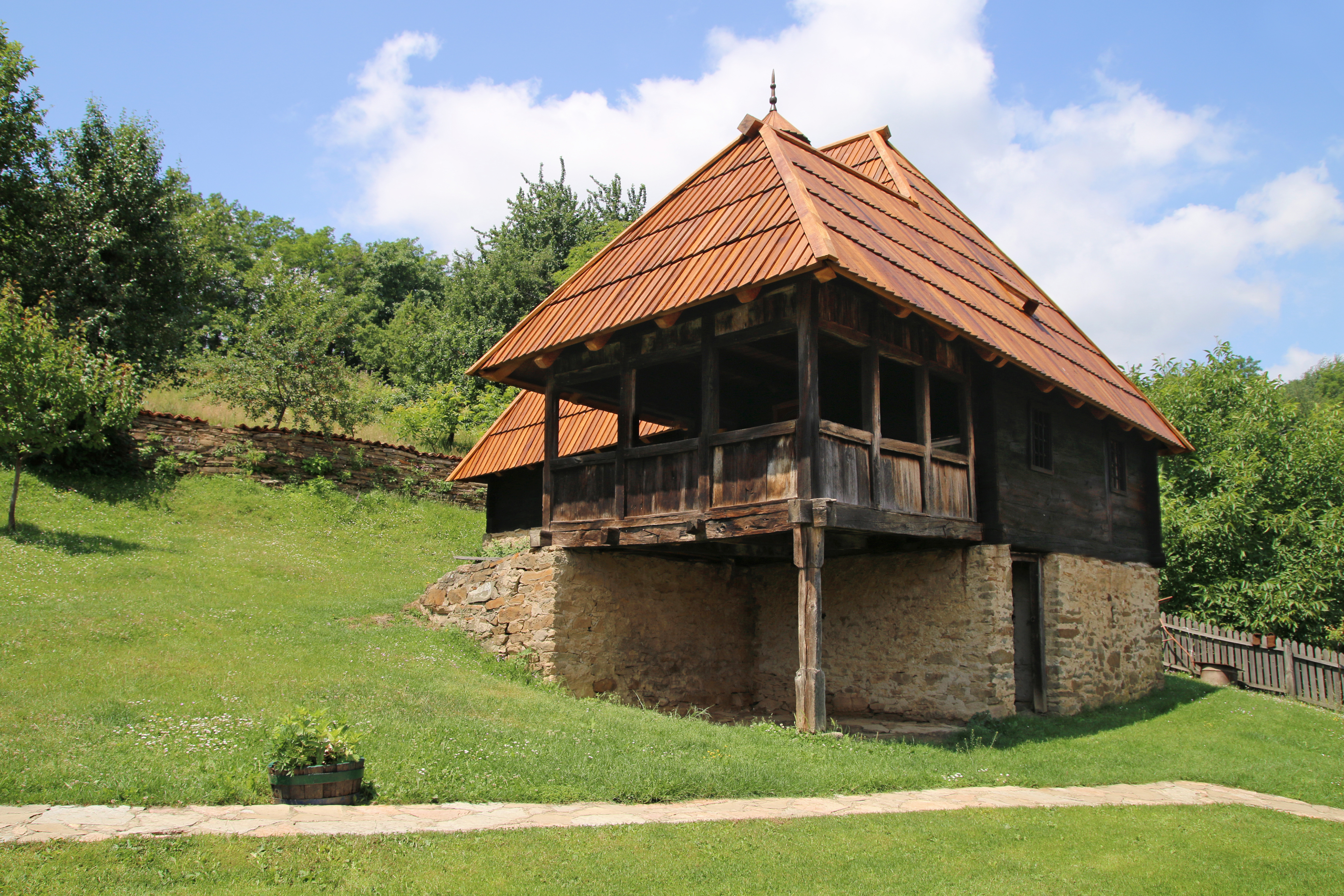

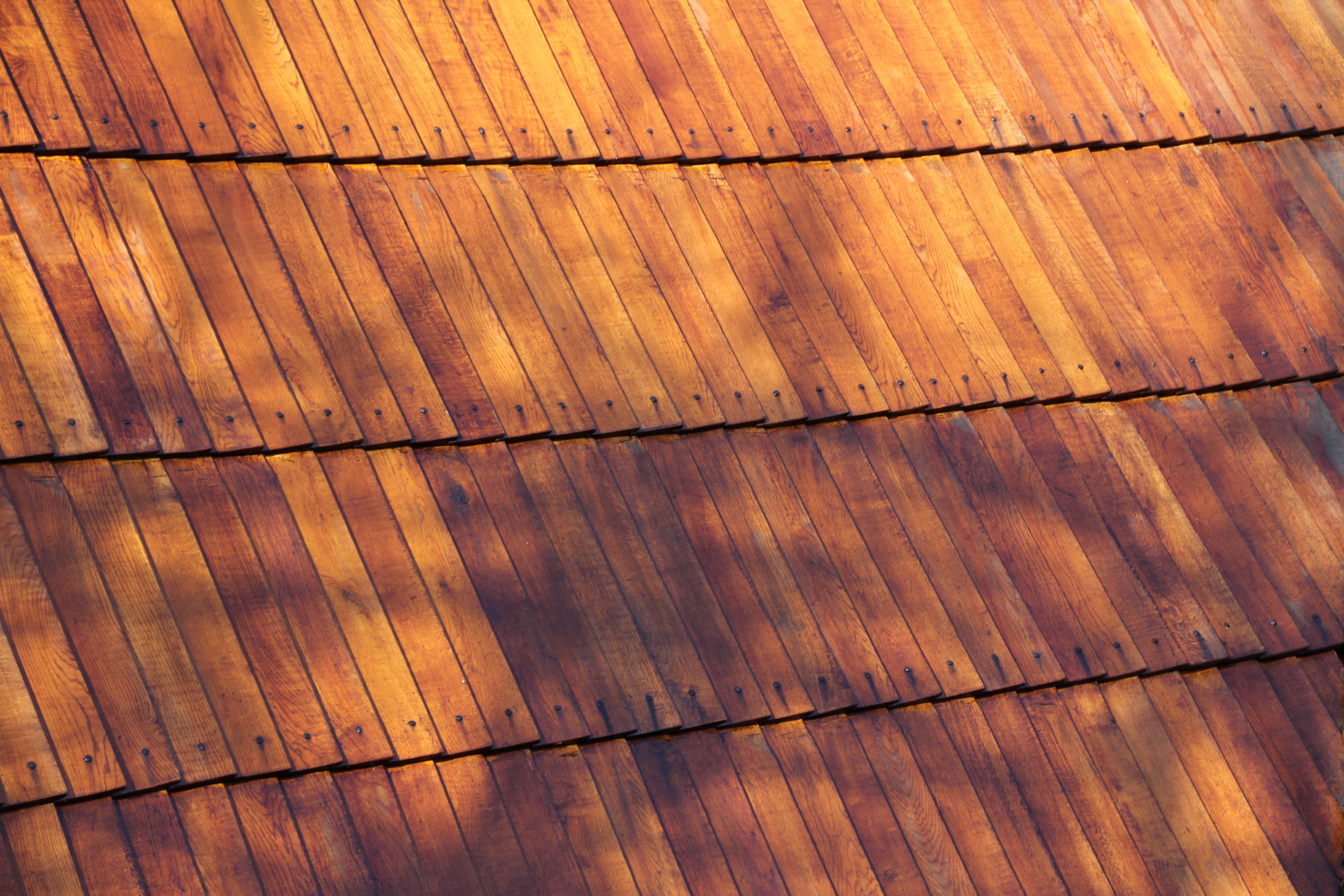
