= Konstamonitou Monastery =

Monastery on Mount Athos, Greece

- Μονή Κωνσταμονίτου
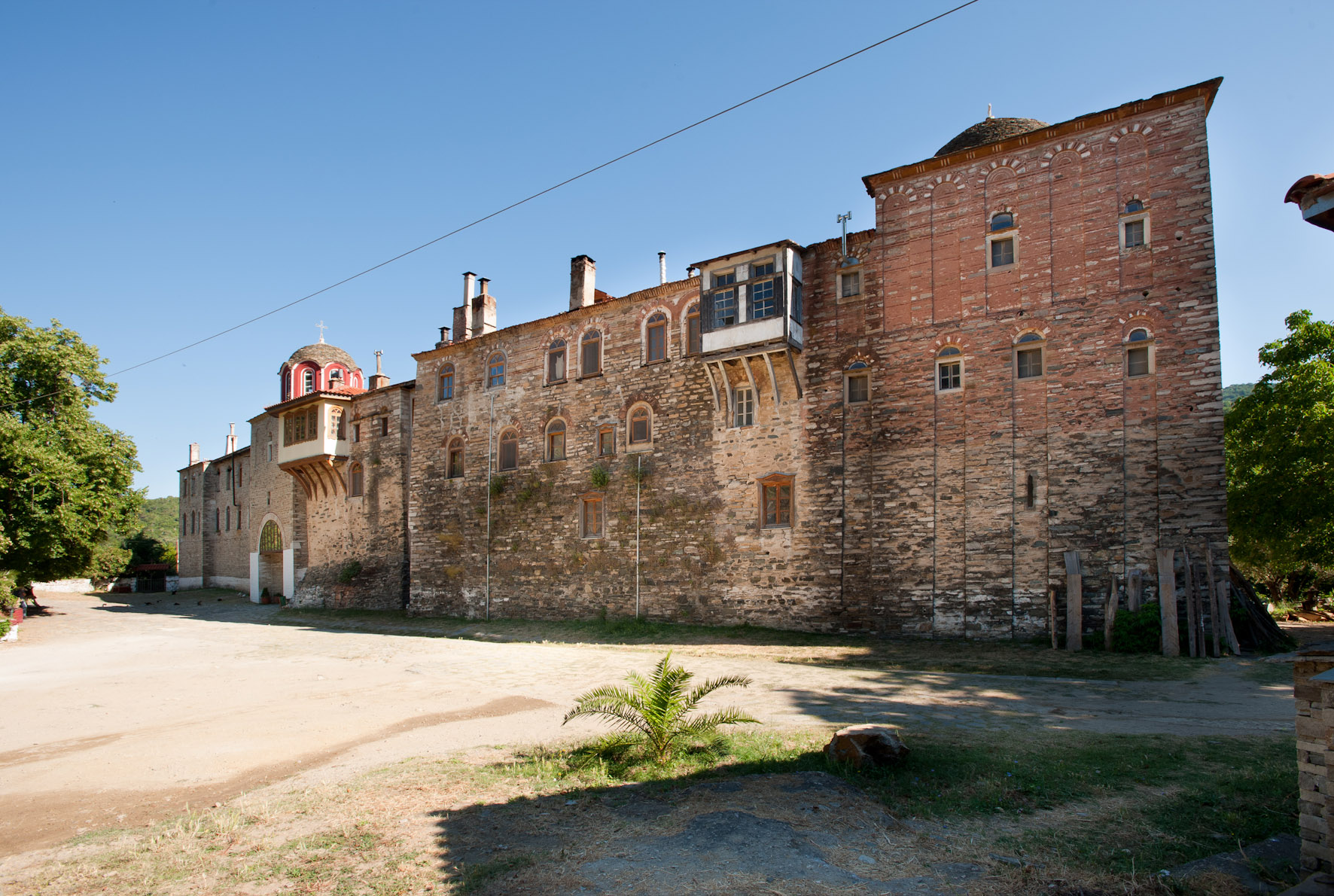
- External view of the monastery.

- Location within Mount Athos
- Interactive map of Konstamonitou Monastery

Monastery information
- Full name: Holy Monastery of Konstamonitou
- Other name: Kastamonitou
- Dedication: Saint Stephen
- Diocese: Mount Athos

People
- Founder: Constantine the Great
- Prior: Archimandrite Elder Charalampos

Site
- Location: Mount Athos, Greece
- Coordinates: 40°17′17.43″N 24°10′26.01″E
- Public access: Men only

The Kastamonitou Monastery (Greek: Μονή Κασταμονίτου), officially called Konstamonitou Monastery (Μονή Κωνσταμονίτου), is an Orthodox Christian monastery in the monastic state of Mount Athos in Greece. It stands on the southeastern side of the Athos peninsula. The monastery ranks twentieth and last in the hierarchy of the Athonite monasteries.

The monastery was founded in the mid-11th century, either by an unknown member of the aristocratic Byzantine Kastamonites family, or by an unrelated person hailing from the area of Kastamon in Paphlagonia. It is dedicated to Saint Stephen. Its history during the Byzantine period is obscure, and until the 14th century it appears to have been a moderate establishment. After it was destroyed in a fire in the 1420s and restored by the Serbian magnate Radič, it attracted many monks from the South Slavic lands, and experienced a century of prosperity.

The monastery's present buildings date to the 18th and 19th centuries. The monastery has about 40 working monks, including novices, making it one of the more populated monasteries on the Athonite peninsula. The monastery library holds 110 manuscripts and approximately 5,000 printed books.

== Sources ==
- Talbot, Alice-Mary; Cutler, Anthony (1991). "Kastamonitou Monastery". In Kazhdan, Alexander (ed.). The Oxford Dictionary of Byzantium. Oxford and New York: Oxford University Press. p. 1110. ISBN 0-19-504652-8.
