= Grabovica (Gornji Milanovac) =

Grabovica Грабовица
- Village
- Motto(s): Упорност и знање је цена успеха (Serbian) "Persistence and knowledge is the price of success "
- Location within Serbia
- Coordinates: 44°01′N 20°30′E
- Country: Serbia
- District: Moravica District
- Statistical region: Šumadija and Western Serbia
- Municipality: Gornji Milanovac
- Established: 1718 (Unofficial)

Government
  - Type: Village council
  - President of the Grabovica Community Council: Mileta Tešić

Area
  - Total: 598 sq mi (1,548 km^{2})
- Elevation: 1,600 ft (500 m)

Population (2022)
  - Total: 396
  - Density: 66.1/sq mi (25.52/km^{2})
- as per the 2022 census
- Time zone: UTC+1 (CET)
  - Summer (DST): UTC+2 (CEST)
- Postal code: 32300
- Area code: +381 32
- Website: http://www.gornjimilanovac.rs/lat/e-mesne.html

Grabovica (Serbian Cyrillic: Грабовица, pronounced [graboʋit̪͡s̪a]) is a village and neighborhood association in the municipality of Gornji Milanovac in central Serbia, with a population of 396 people (2022 census).

== Geography, climate, and ecosystem ==
Grabovica is located 6 km from Gornji Milanovac. This village is dispersed settlement Rural type.

Main hamlets (or official they are called Cadastral community) in the village are:

- Arnautići (meaning: Place of Inhabitants from Old Serbia territory),
- Čokanja (meaning: Hill),
- Parac (meaning: Nearness by town),
- Rapaj Brdo (derived from arab word ربوة, and it means the Highest peak ) and
- Votnjaci (meaning: Orchards).

The highest peaks in Grabovica are: Klik 721 m (2,365 ft), Veliki Vrh 691 m (2,267 ft), Mali Vrh 623 m (2,044 ft), and Parac 602 m (1975 ft).

Grabovica, like Gornji Milanovac, has Humid continental climate. The hottest months of the year are July and August, while the coldest are January and February. Absolute maximum in air temperature range is 38.8 °C (101.8 °F) on July 6, 1950 and absolute minimum is −30.4 °C (−22.7 °F) on February 17, 1956. The average annual precipitation height is in the range of 788 mm (31.02 in). The most precipitation falls in the period April–June and the least in October–February. Average snow cover stays for 160–190 days. Minimum mean wind speed is 1.7–2.6 m/s (3.11–5.05 knots) and maximum 13.8–20.7 m/s (26.83–40.24 knots). The maximum speed occurs here with southeastern, southwestern and southern winds. Annual average daily global sun radiation energy on a horizontal surface of municipality Gornji Milanovac is between 3.8–4.0 kWh/m^{2} (0.33-0.35 BTU/ft^{2}). The average recorded emission of CO2 is 0.52 tons. Relative humidity is 85% on average in winter periods and 78.5% on average in summer periods.

In this village, there are various water resources. As proof of that, there are numerous water wells. Soil on its territory is mostly brown earth on diabase. The vegetation period lasts 220–260 days. Forest vegetation makes up 2/3 of the total area and contains hornbeam, pilar, oak, acacia, etc. Plant vegetation consists of meadow grass (in the majority), meadows, and grassland. As for November 2015 and changes of the settlements territory boundaries of this village, the village is surrounded by the smaller Grabovica river and to a lesser part on the north of the territory, rivers: Glogovac and Gruža.

== History ==
There are several sites in Grabovica from the Roman and Byzantine eras. There are Roman archaeological sites in the hamlet of Arnauti-Kršić, some "Hungarian" sites (as local people call them), and a church from the period of Austrian occupation of Serbia (1718-1739) in Parac. Radič Postupović (1413–1441), a magnate of the Serbian Despotate, founded the Monastery of the Great Annunciation (Veliko Blagoveštenje) in the village of Grabovica, sometime before 1429–30. These monuments were demolished when the area underwent colonisation. In 1718, there were no households in Grabovica. According to Dr Milenko S. Filipović, larger settlement began from the period of 1718–1739, when central Serbia was occupied by the Habsburgs. In 1735, there were 15 households. The inhabitants were mainly settled from the Ottoman regions of Bosnia and Herzegovina, Montenegro, and southwestern Serbia.

The village was active in the Serbian Revolution, being organized into the knežina (administrative unit) of Brusnica (Takovo) during the First Serbian Uprising (1804–13). The revolutionaries Mijailo Veličković, Ivan Šalavardić and the Blagojević and Mićović families came from the village.

The village saw industrial progress in the 60s through the 90s breakup of Yugoslavia. In the 1961 census, Grabovica had its biggest registered population, at 897 inhabitants. In that period (1955-1999) major immigration came from Montenegro, Croatia, Kosovo and Metohija, and some parts of the Raška region. A demographic decrease happened in the 1971–2002 period. Also, Grabovica had a publicly owned Agricultural cooperative in the period from the 1940s to the late 1970s, specialized in wool, cereals, milk, eggs, crops, fruits, and vegetables. Their head office was in the place of today Cultural, Administration, Information and Assembly Center (CAIAC) of the settlement Grabovica. At the beginning of the 1980s, Grabovica Agriculture Cooperation merged with other Gornji Milanovac agriculture enterprises and functioned as a member and partner of Gornji Milanovac big PIK "Takovo" (today "Swisslion Takovo" Concern) and other food industry across former Yugoslavia.

== Demographics ==
According to the 2022 census, the village had a population of 396 people, with an average age of 46.03 for males and 48.30 for females. According to the 2011 census, there were 456 inhabitants in 148 households.

== Sports ==
During winter times on Ždreban peak, recreational skiers and other athletes use some paths for their exercises. Grabovica has 2 ball open parks for recreation purpose:3x3 Basketball, Basketball, Tennis, Track racing, Snooker, Futsal, Handball and Table tennis. Grabovica, today have newly formed football club FK Sparta Grabovica which was established in June 2015. This football club does not have its own football stadium, but the settlement council promised to realize that initiative in the periods ahead.

== Tourism and culture ==
Grabovica has great potential for progress in the area of tourism, thanks to its geographical position and panoramic view over Gornji Milanovac and the surroundings. Grabovica woods are popular for hunting for venison. The Ždreban peak of Grabovica is also and famous picnic place for the 1 May celebration or International Workers' Day, even today. This village has a few privately owned country hotels.

Grabovica has a Youth Culture and Information Center, currently under reconstruction. The plan is to build a modern center of the village with diversity of information (such as new tourist signs; information service; web page incorporated in Gornji Milanovac tourist organization web site for touristic purposes; hydro-meteorological, daily radiation, information about the concentration of allergens in the air; about road conditions and advice). This cultural center is the main place for gathering, like for: organization of voting and referendums, youth parties, cultural exposure, humanitarian actions, trading, family register, social-tax evidence, and public sessions of the village citizens. Also, in the past, on the land of the territory of this village was the House of Serbian-Norwegian friendship. After the new internal borders in the municipality of Gornji Milanovac, this cultural center became a part of the Gornji Milanovac settlement. Also, there is a mass grave with a monument for the fallen soldiers of the Austro-Hungarian Army and Serbian Royal Army in the same place (from the World War I). On the peak of Ždreban (meaning in English- Foal), there are ruins of a planned children's Rehabilitation hospital (1950), but investments were insufficient, and there is no planned construction. Also, on the same peak, the "Natural Mystic Festival" for Reggae Music is held every end of April.

Through the winter, spring, and summer periods in the areas of Grabovica hamlets, horse riding and quad bike tours (ATV tour) are being organized. This automotive sports adventure is more popular among the local population and tourists who visit the municipality of Gornji Milanovac.

Elevated areas of the village, including the hamlet of Parac, provide panoramic views of Gornji Milanovac and surrounding settlements. Clear views of the night sky are possible from November to February and from July to August.

Feast of the Ascension is the village patron day. During that celebration, people of this village gather for the launch or barbecue with their other family members, neighbours, and friends. Some residents donate food to the poor population of Gornji Milanovac.

== Notable people ==
Grabovica had/has several notable residents:

- Milomir Marić, Serbian journalist, writer, and television presenter;

== Economy ==
Many residents depend on Gornji Milanovac industry and economy. Many of them works in the following economic sectors:

- Secondary sector- 106,
- Primary sector- 35,
- Tertiary sector- 48 and
- Unknown- 4.

== Infrastructure ==
Through this village passes Road 177 and Regional bypass road Gornji Milanovac-Grabovica-Knić-Kragujevac. Also, the major road that is passing through the village, connecting other hamlets of Grabovica and center of municipality Gornji Milanovac and in the same time it is a detour, is marked L-12 (mark "L" stands for "Local road"). The nearest path to the center of the municipality is 6.3 km (3.91 mi). Also turn to state highways E-763 (class Ia) is close by Grabovica. In sense of use civilian airports, nearest one is Morava Airport (local road L18-Lunjevica, Gornja Trepča, interpasses E-763 at Mrčajevci to Ladjevci). This village is connected to Water supply network Banjani (local supply) and Rzav (Moravica district regional supplier). Also, Grabovica is interconnected with Gornji Milanovac local supplier JP "Grejanje" of the natural gas network. As for internet infrastructure, residents of this village are connected by ADSL and it is in planned to set up one up steaming receiver for MMDS. On its terrain, Grabovica has one radio-television repeater and all residents are connected to the landline and mobile telephony. Major households in Grabovica are connected to municipality sewerage and waste systems, while in the other parts users are connected on own cesspits which are regularly maintained independently or by waste and water management company JKP Gornji Milanovac.

== Gallery ==
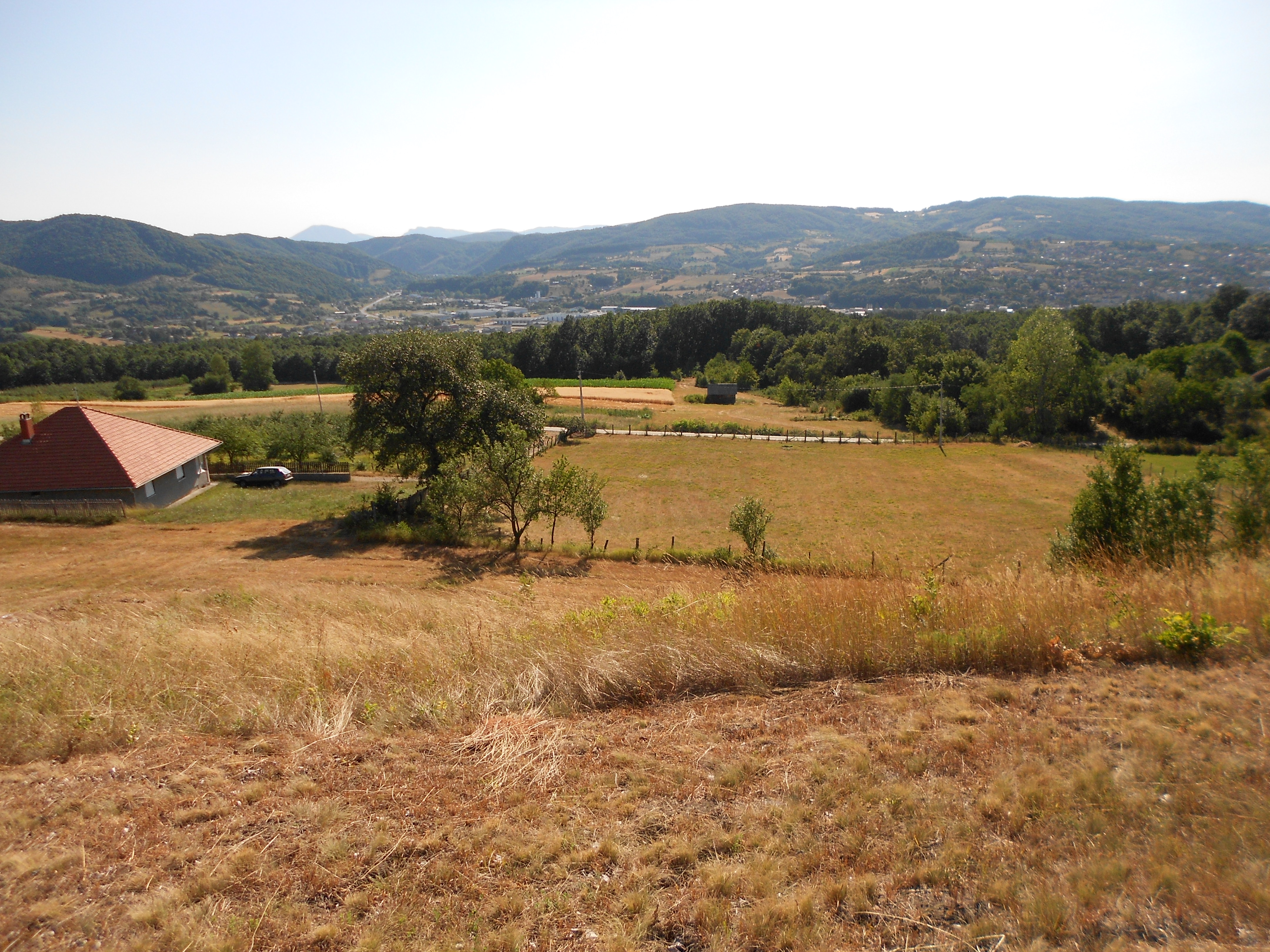
View on Gornji Milanovac from nearby Grabovica village

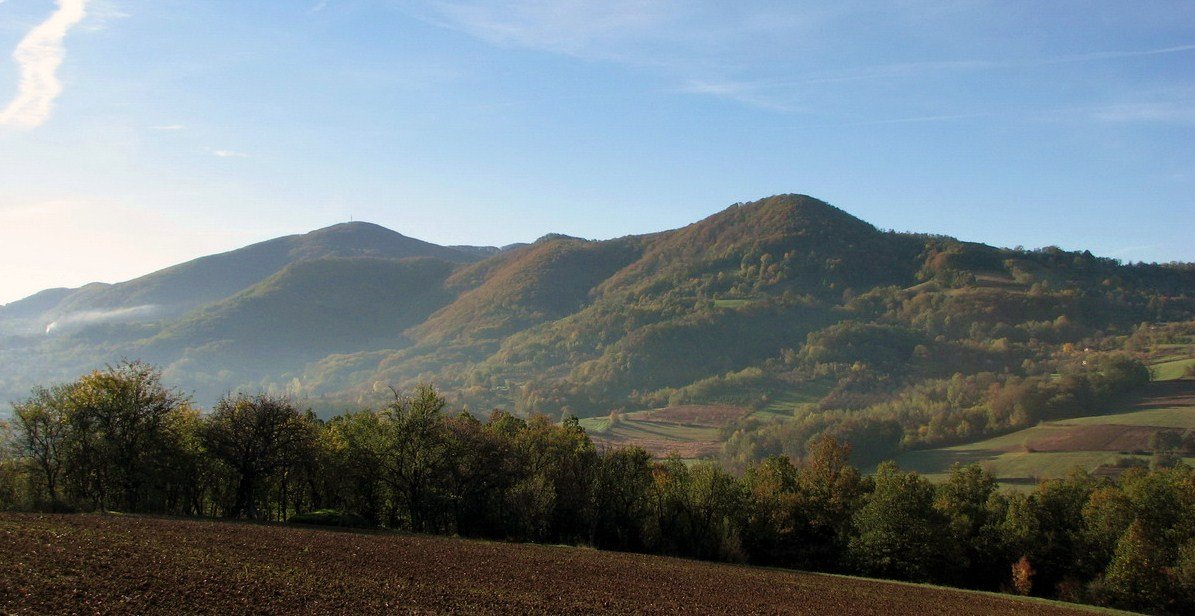
Rapaj brdo is the peak in village Grabovica (municipality of Gornji Milanovac, Republic of Serbia)

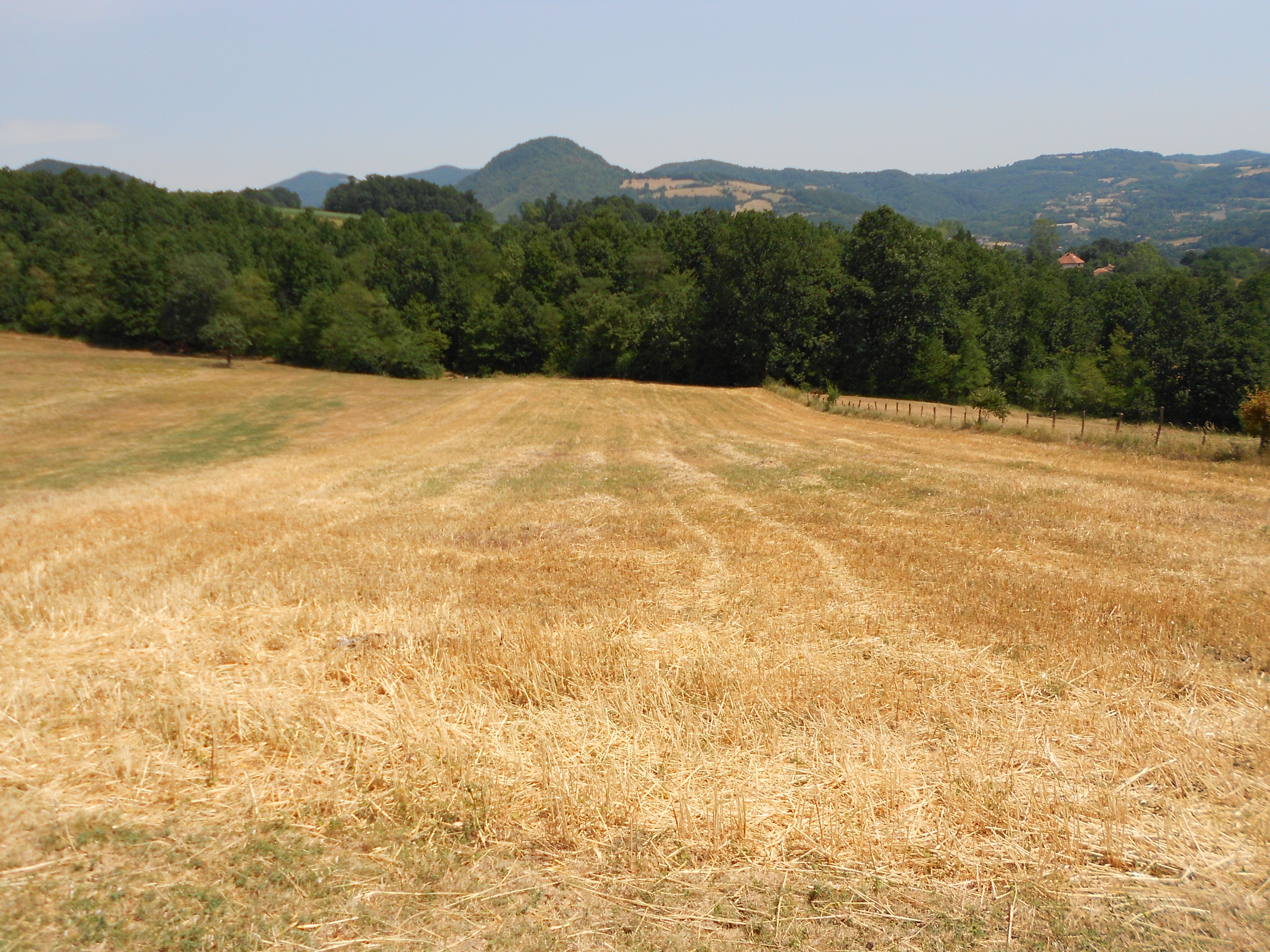
Hamlet of Parac is located in village Grabovica (Gornji Milanovac, Serbia) and view on Treska peak

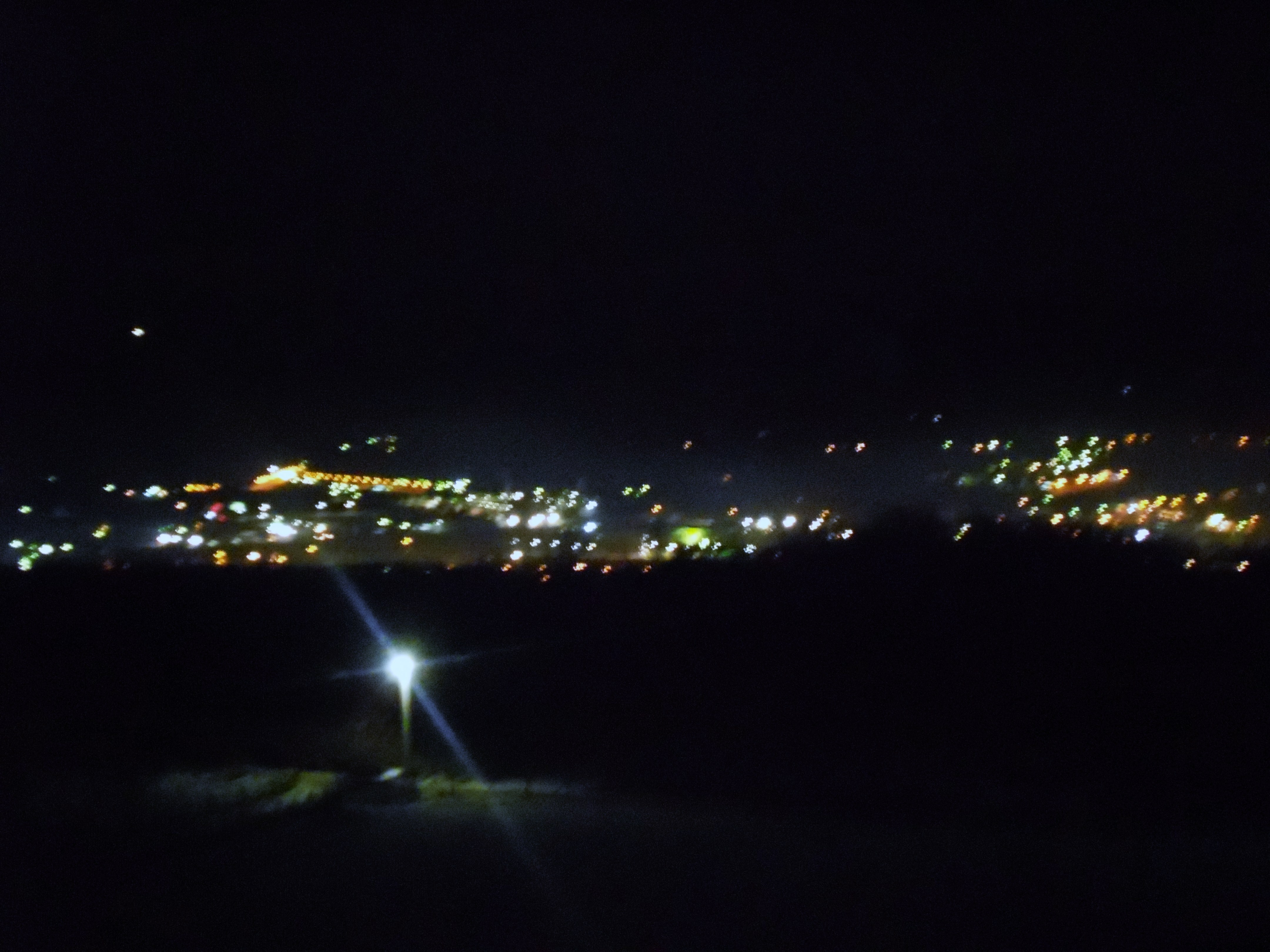
Night view on one part of Gornji Milanovac from Grabovica village (Hamlet of Parac)

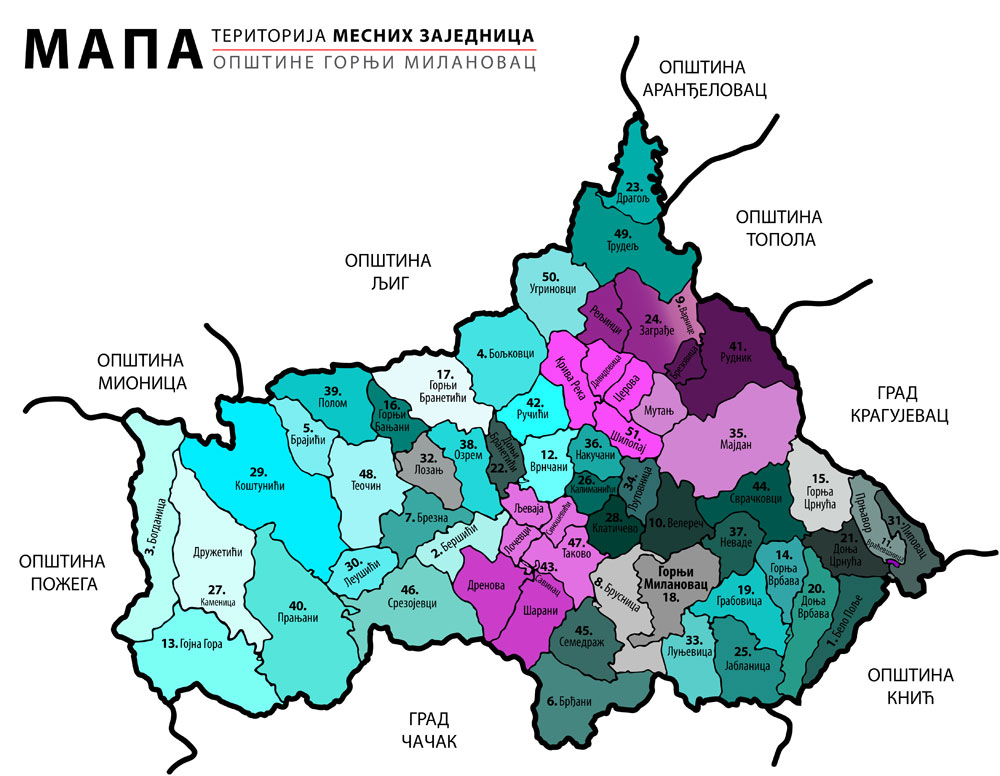
Map of the settlements in Gornji Milanovac and their territory organisation. Grabovica is marked under the number 19

== Neighboring settlements with Grabovica ==
Grabovica is bordering with:
