= Gornja Crnuća =

- Village
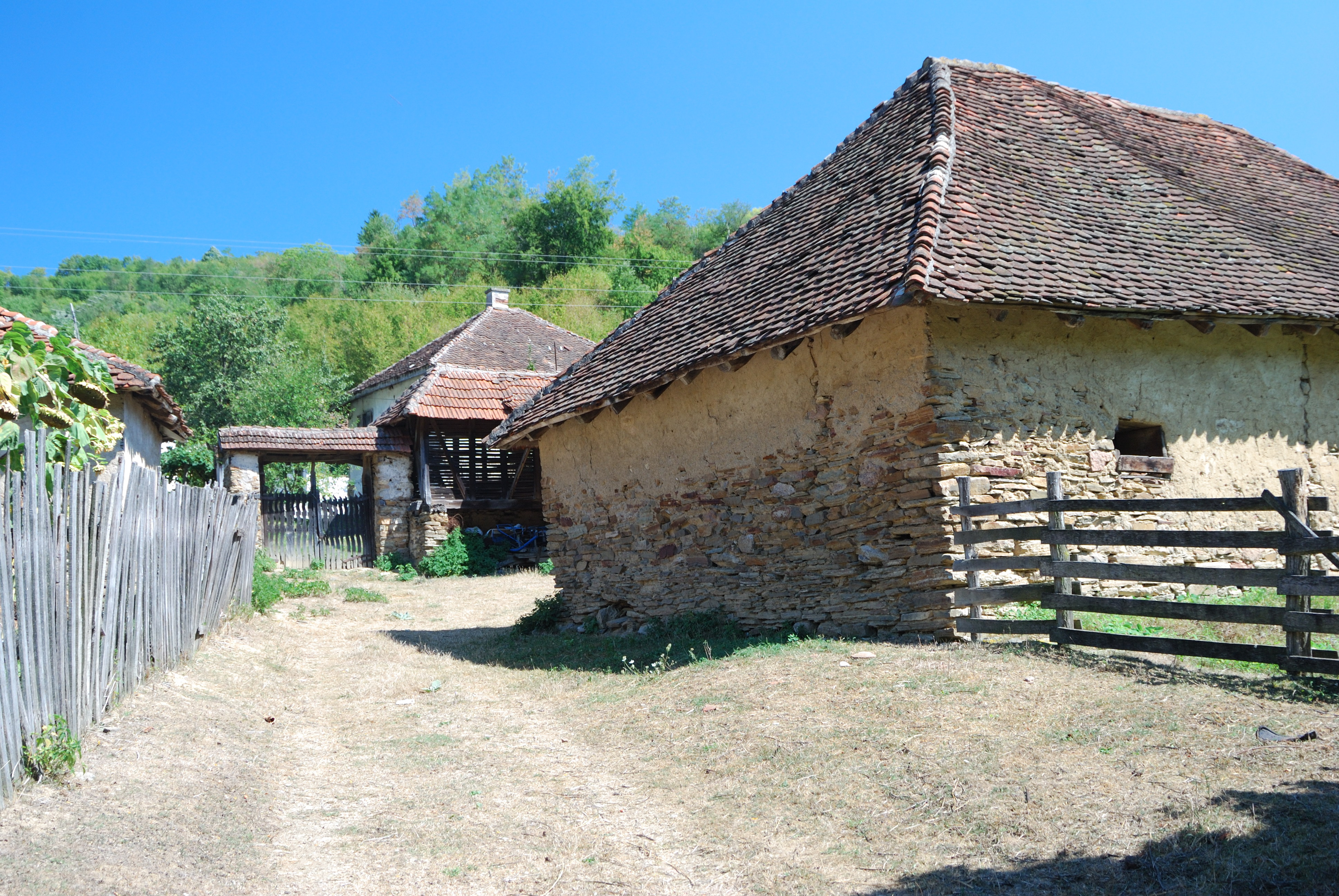

- Location within Serbia
- Coordinates: 44°4′N 20°35′E
- Country: Serbia

Population (2011)
  - Total: 175
- Time zone: UTC+1 (CET)
  - Summer (DST): UTC+2 (CEST)

Gornja Crnuća (Serbian Cyrillic: Горња Црнућа) is a village located in Gornji Milanovac municipality of Serbia.

The village was active in the Serbian Revolution, being organized into the knežina (administrative unit) of Kačer during the First Serbian Uprising (1804–13).

There are several points of significance in the village. It is best known for the house of Miloš Obrenović in which the Second Serbian Uprising started. In fact, the village was the capital of what was then Principality of Serbia, from 1815 until 1818. The house was the official residence of the Sovereign, the Vraćevšnica Monastery which is one of the more significant Serbian monasteries. There also is a well-stocked hunting range and a scenic hiking path. The village was deemed an Ecological Village within the Ecological Municipality of Gornji Milanovac.

== Notable people ==
- Mija Aleksić, actor
