= Vraćevšnica =

Coordinates: 44°03′N 20°38′E

- Village
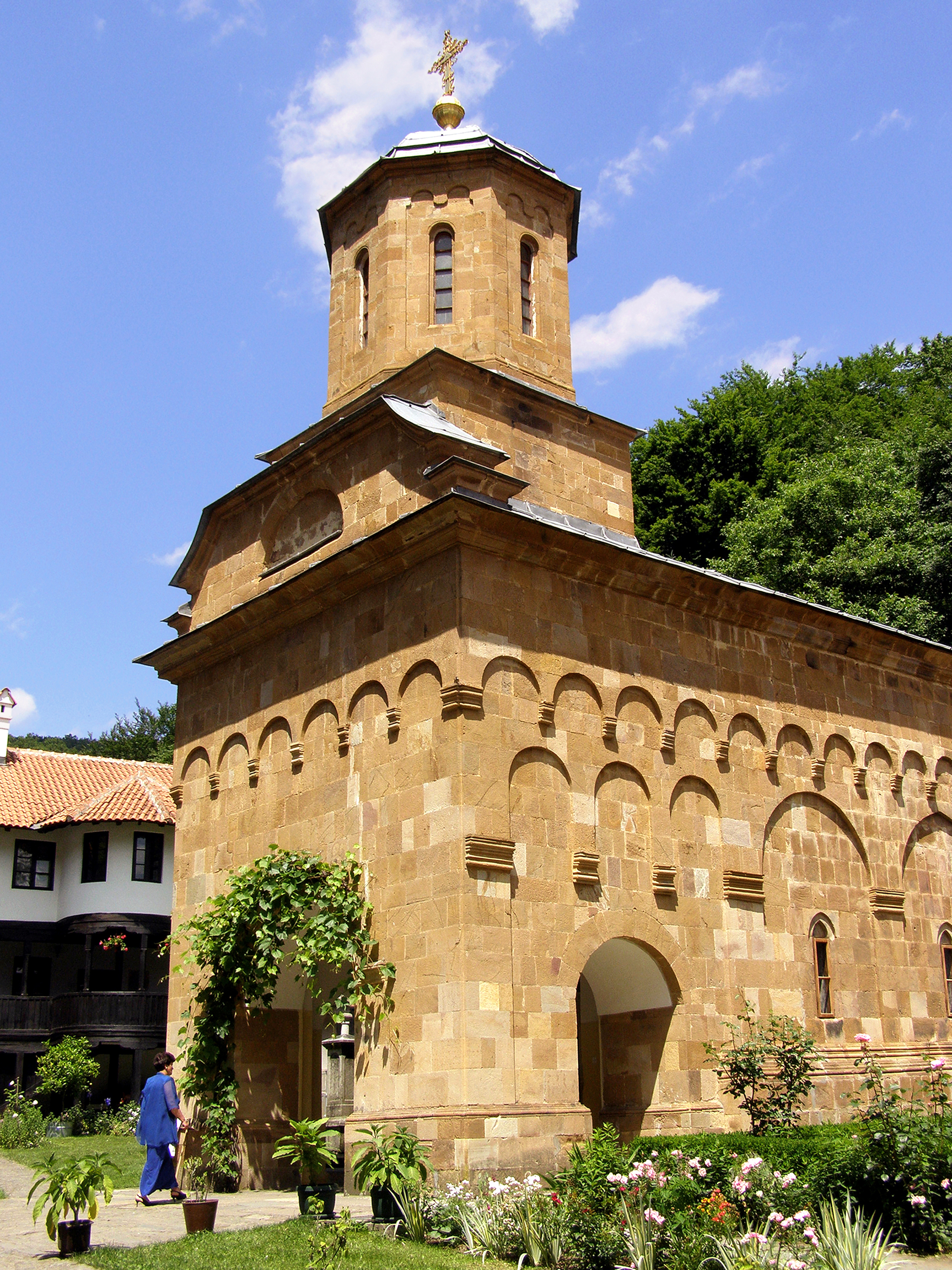
- Vracevsnica monastery is a Serbian Orthodox monastery in Vracevsnica, Gornji Milanovac, Serbia, built in 1428-1429 on the orders of Radic (fl. 1389-1441), a magnate in the service of Stefan Lazarevic and Djuradj Brankovic. The church is dedicated to Saint George.
- Interactive map of Vraćevšnica
- Country: Serbia
- District: Moravica District
- Municipality: Gornji Milanovac

Population (2002)
  - Total: 150
- Time zone: UTC+1 (CET)
  - Summer (DST): UTC+2 (CEST)

Vraćevšnica (Serbian: Враћевшница, pronounced [v̞rǎtɕɛːv̞ʃnitsa]) is a village in the municipality of Gornji Milanovac, Serbia. According to the 2002 census, the village has a population of 150 people.

Radič (fl. 1389–1441), a magnate in the service of Serbian monarchs Stefan Lazarević and Đurađ Branković, built the Vraćevšnica monastery in the village in 1428.
