= Banatska Crna Gora =

Banatska Crna Gora (Serbian Cyrillic: Банатска Црна Гора, meaning "Black Mountain of Banat") is a historical region between Timișoara and Lugoj in western Romania.

== History ==
"Banatska Crna Gora" is the native Serbian name for the region. Radič, the Serbian magnate, received possessions in Banatska Crna Gora.

== Population ==
The region is inhabited by Eastern Orthodox Serbs (see Serbs in Romania). They speak a dialect of the Serbian language. Pavle Ivić (1924–1999) studied their speech.

== See also ==
- Clisura Dunării or "Banatska Klisura"
