= Radič (veliki čelnik) =

Serbian noble, Grand Čelnik, comes palatinus

Radič Postupović
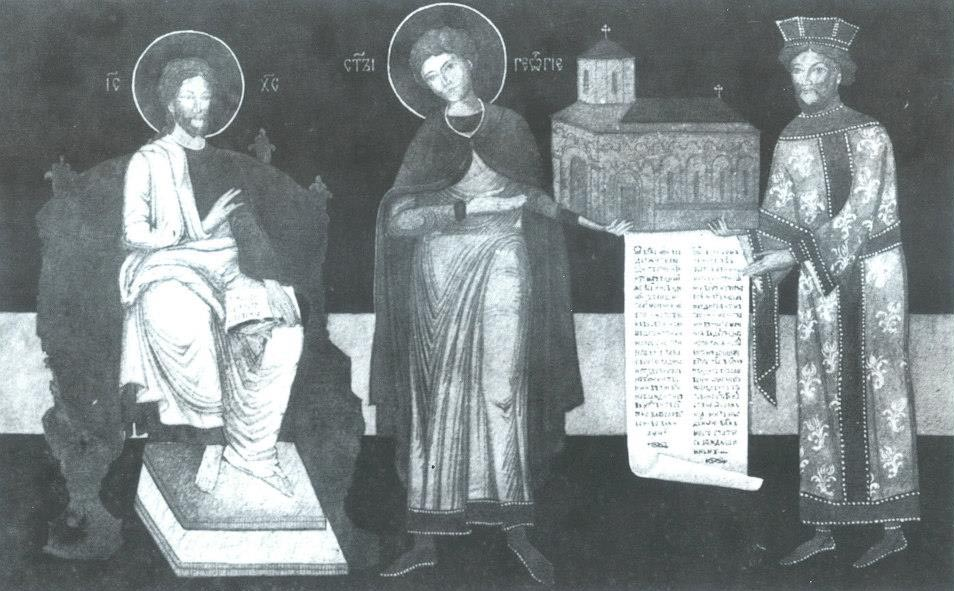
- Radič granting his endowment to Christ

Grand Čelnik of Serbia
- Reign: fl. 1428–1433
- Predecessor: Hrebeljan
- Successor: ?
- Born: before 1389; Moravian Serbia
- Died: between 1441 and 1456; Kastamonitou, Mount Athos
- Buried: Vraćevšnica monastery (his endowment)
- Spouse: Ana
- Issue: Misailo
- Father: Milutin
- Occupation: Nobleman, Monk

Radič also known as Radich Postupovich (Serbian Cyrillic: Радич; fl. 1413–1441) was a Serbian nobleman that had the title of Grand Čelnik (count palatine), the highest dignitary after the Serbian monarch. He began his service under Prince, later Despot, Stefan Lazarević (r. 1389–1427) as čelnik, then was elevated to Grand Čelnik during the rule of Despot Đurađ Branković (r. 1427–1456). He was very wealthy, and held the silver mines in Novo Brdo of the Serbian Despotate. Radič founded and renovated several churches and monasteries which still exist, including the notable Vraćevšnica and Kastamonitou. He took monastic vows and became a monk in Kastamonitou where he spent his last years.

He held the highest position, under Stefan Lazarević and Đurađ Branković, and was the longest office-holder (čelnik), and the most powerful political figure besides the monarch in his time.

== Origin and early life ==
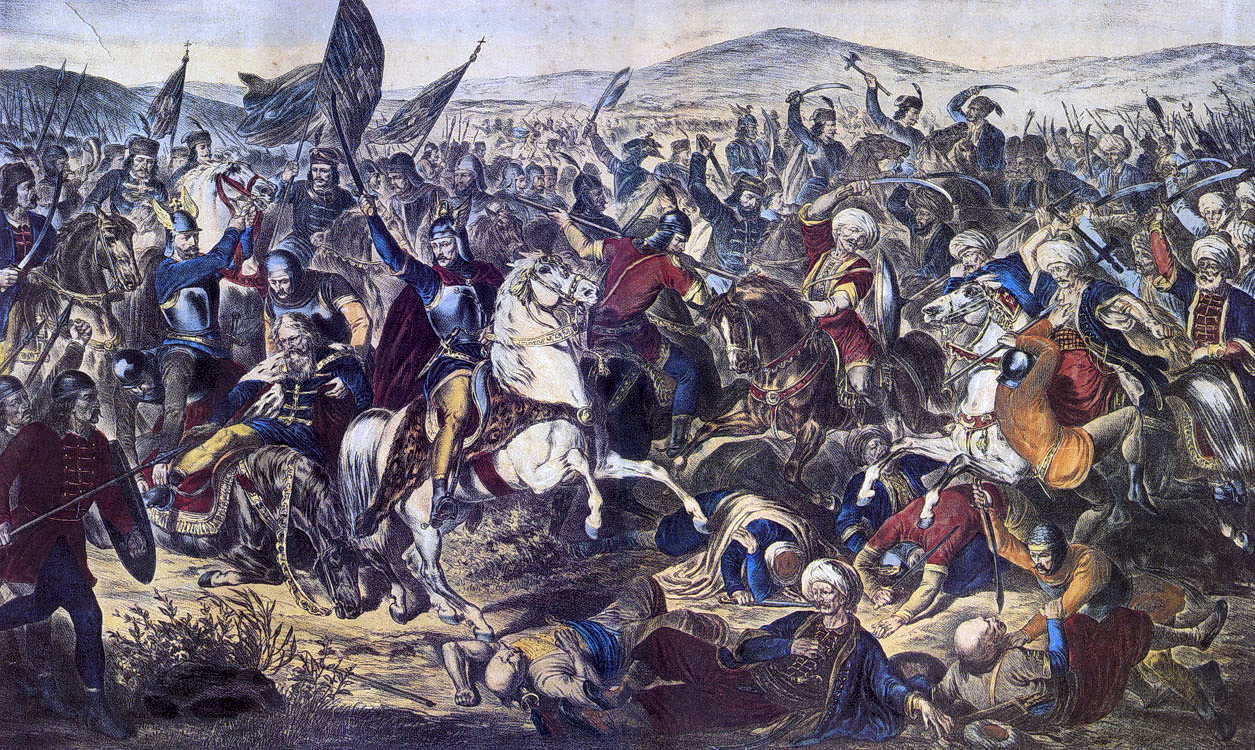
The bulk of both the Serbian and Ottoman army were destroyed in the Battle of Kosovo, including the Serbian Prince and Ottoman Sultan, and also Radič's father. Radič was the only one from his village who returned home alive.

Radič was born in ca. 1363 or 1372, in the village of Kamenica, to a family of miners, who extracted lead, zinc and silver from the Rudnik mine. Radič's father was vojvoda Milutin, a lord of Gruža. He was brought up at the court of Prince Lazar of Serbia and was friends with the heir, Stefan. At the age of 17, he joined his father's contingent and fought at the Battle of Kosovo (1389) under the command of Prince Lazar against Ottoman Sultan Murad I; according to tradition he prayed to Saint George and promised that if he would survive, he would found the Vraćevšnica monastery as a sign of gratitude. Some older soldiers made fun of his age, but he survived without a scratch, and became glorified as the strongest and most courageous fighter of the younger generation. The bulk of both armies were wiped out in the battle, including Prince Lazar and Murad I; although the Ottomans annihilated the Serbian army, they also suffered high casualties which delayed their progress. Serbs were left with too few men to effectively defend their lands, while the Turks had many more troops in the east. Consequently, the Serbian principalities that were not already Ottoman vassals, one after the other became so in the following decades.

== Service under Stefan Lazarević ==
Radič had the title of čelnik under Despot Stefan Lazarević. Stefan Lazarević wrote two charters in 1405, which granted Radič possessions. In the same year Despot Stefan wrote a charter "from the glorious city of Borač", which was held by Radič. Radič held a great estate in Upper Gruža, at the foot of the Rudnik, where he would later found Vraćevšnica. He and Despot Stefan led the Serbian army that supported Mehmet I and defeated Musa Çelebi at the Battle of Çamurlu (Ottoman Interregnum) in 1413. He held not only Rudnik and its surroundings; he received 70 villages in, among others, Braničevo and Kičevo by Despot Stefan.

== Service under Đurađ Branković ==
Radič was elevated to Grand Čelnik during the rule of Đurađ Branković, in the first half of 1429. The Grand Čelnik was the highest court title of the Serbian Despotate, and the title-holders held great provinces, property, and honours, and Radič was one of the most powerful ones.

"This Holy Temple of God [Vraćevšnica] was delineated, finished and ornamented by the Great Captain Radič in the name of Celebrated Great Martyr Saint George"

— Inscription in the south part of the Eastern wall of the vestibule of Vraćevšnica

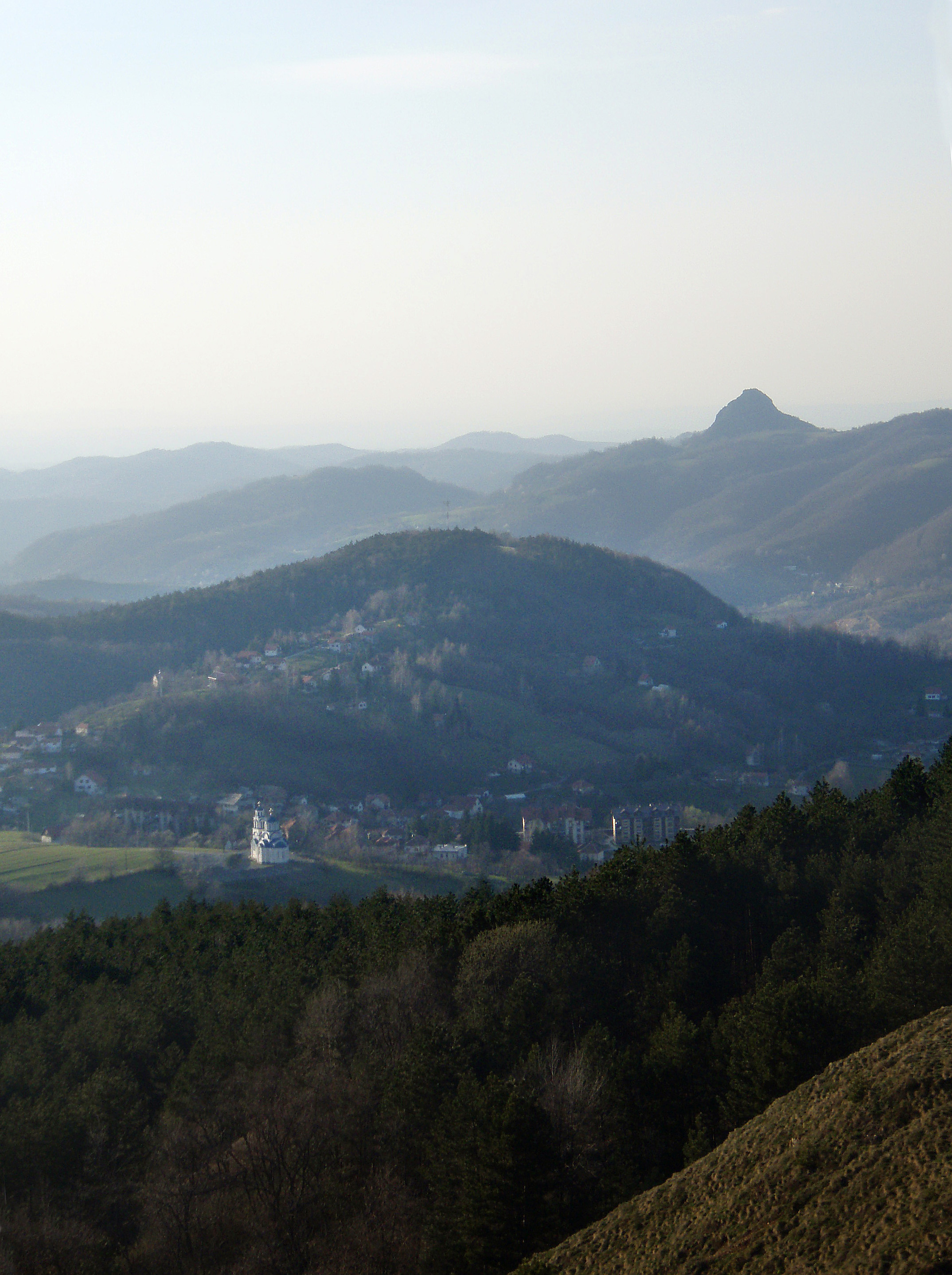
View of Rudnik.

Radič's lands were the mines in Novo Brdo and Rudnik, and the city of Koznik. Radič held the Rudnik area (ou Roudnikou metochou), which had the villages of Beluća, Prodanovci, Kamenica, Šumeni and Vlasi Vojkovci; He founded the Vraćevšnica Monastery in 1428–1429, which lied below the Rudnik, in Vraćevštica, which was composed out of five villages: Gornja and Donja (Upper and Lower) Vraćevštica (Vraćevšnica), Grahovac, Konjuša and Brezova. According to tradition, Radič lived in Beluća, which later was called and still today bears the name "Crnuća" (Gornja and Donja), after all of its male adults fell at the Battle of Kosovo, besides Radič (belo – "white", crno – "black"). Radič also received possessions in Banatska Crna Gora.

Radič also founded the monastery of the Great Annunciation (Veliko Blagoveštenje) in the village of Grabovica, near Gornji Milanovac, sometime before 1429–30. The church dedicated to St. Archangel Gabriel in Borač, in Knić, has an inscription dated to 1553 which name him as the founder. The Milentija monastery, in Milentija, which is mentioned in one of Radič charters dated 1430, was possibly founded by him.

In a 1433 charter issued to Vatopedi by Radič, confirmed by Despot Đurađ, Radič held the village of Halae, while Stevan Ratković held Cerovac, in the province of Nekudim. Radič did not stop at founding and renovating churches in his home region, as soon as he had gained wealth and status, he started reaching out to far away churches, as an example of the past noblemen and dynastic members. hegoumenos Neophytos persuaded Radič to contribute to the restoration of Kastamonitou Monastery on Mount Athos. He became the second ktitor, and then took monastic vows and received the name Roman (after 1433). His spiritual bishop at that time was Marko, the Bishop of Arilje. Radič spent his last years in Kastamonitou as a monk, the monastery then became Serbian.

He was alive in 1441, and is believed to have died before 1456, when Despot Đurađ and his son Lazar Branković (1456–1458) gifted Radič's Church of St. George in Vraćevšnica to Metropolitan Venedikt. Radič was buried in his endowment of Vraćevšnica.

== Gallery ==
Inscription in Vraćevšnica

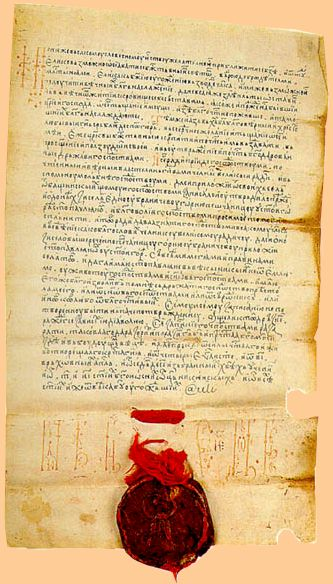
Đurađ Branković's 1430 charter confirming Radič's gifts to the Monastery of St. Paul.

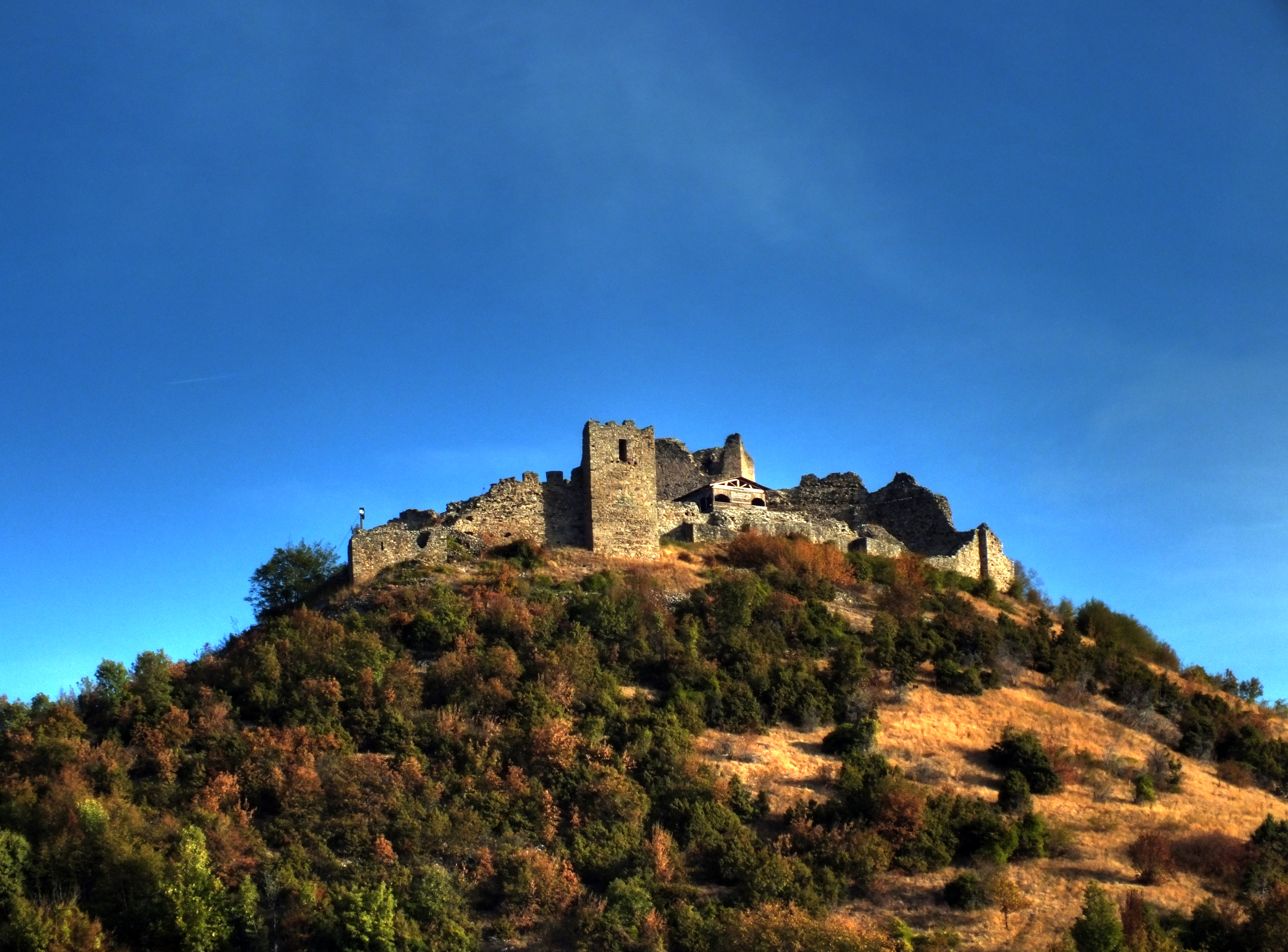
View of Koznik, the estate of Radič.

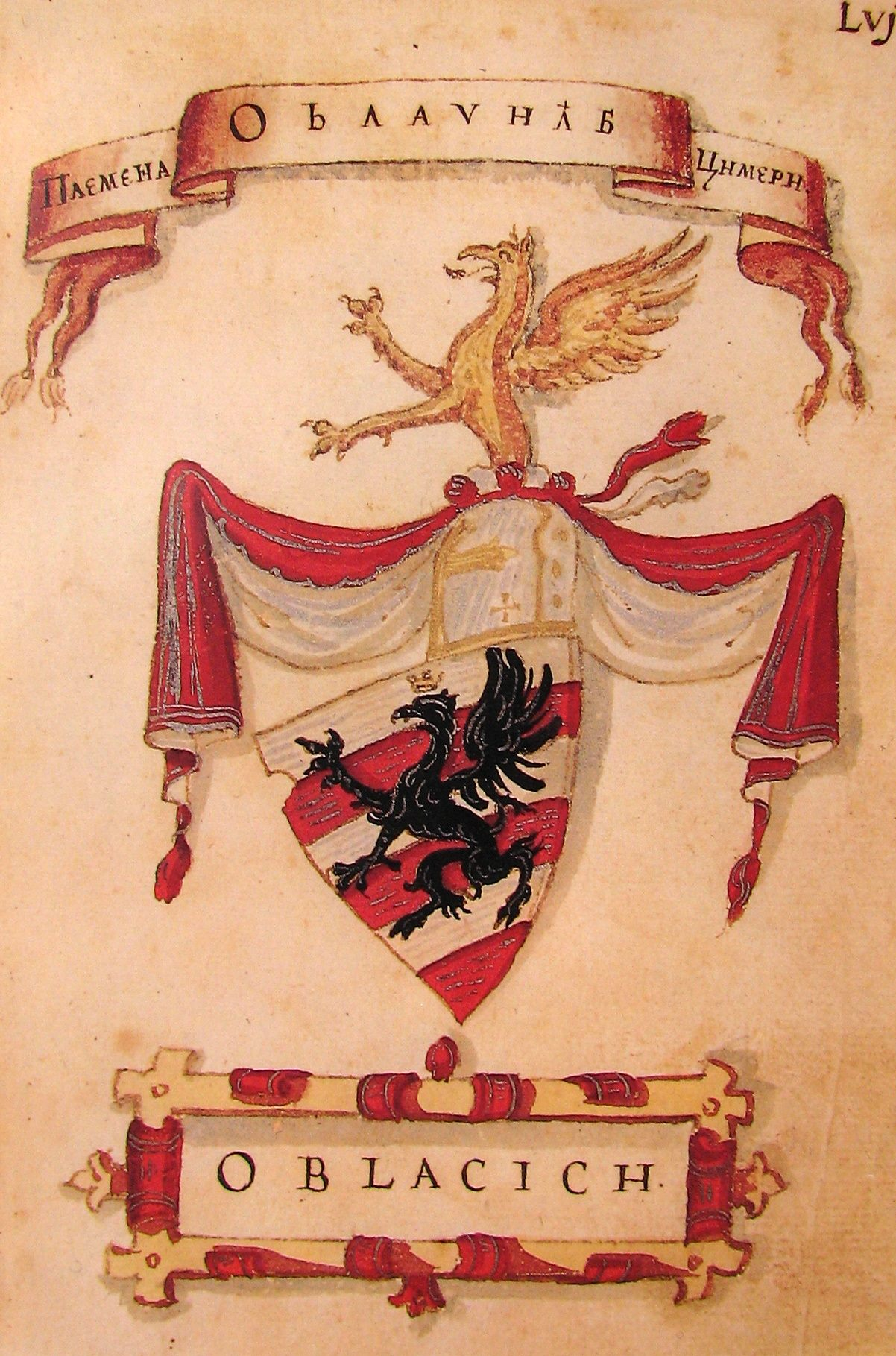
Coat of arms of the Oblačić family according to the Korenić-Neorić Armorial (1595).

== Family ==
He married Ana, and had a son, Mihailo.

== Legacy ==
He is the mythological progenitor of the Radič-Postupović family (Радич-Поступовић), which produced several Orthodox clerics. In Serbian epic poetry, Radič is called Rade Oblačić (Раде Облачић) or Oblak Radosav (Облак Радосав), and also Rajko od Rasine ("Rajko from Rasina").

== See also ==
- Hrebeljan (fl. 1404–1423), Grand Čelnik
- Vuk, Grand Čelnik

== Annotations ==
1. Name: His name was Radič (Cyrillic: Радичь), often written with his titles čelnik, and veliki čelnik. In the Vraćevšnica inscription, only "...pović" is left of his surname. In folk tradition, his surname was Postupović, hence he is also widely known as Radič Postupović (Радич Поступовић).

== Sources ==
- Srpska kraljevska akademija (1960). Srpski etnografski zbornik (in Serbian). Vol. 75–77. Belgrade: Srpska akademija nauka i umetnosti.
- Dinić, Mihailo (1978). Srpske zemlje u srednjem veku: istorijsko-geografske studije (in Serbian). Srpska književna zadruga.
- Stefanović, Miladin (28 March 2009). "Црни Видовдан". Novosti.
