= Vraćevšnica monastery =

Monastery in Serbia

Coordinates: 44°04′05″N 20°36′01″E

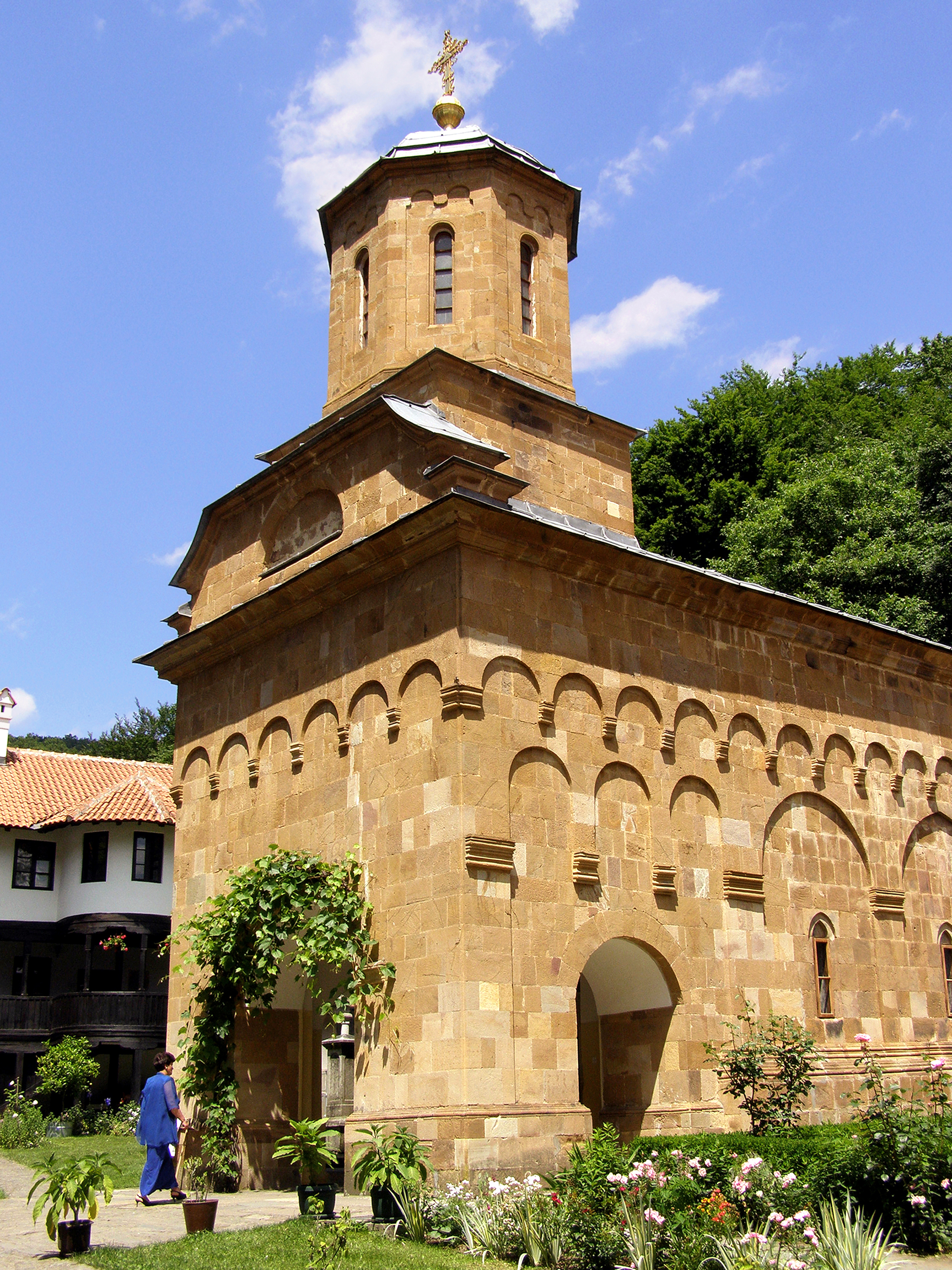
- Church of St George
- Interactive map of Vraćevšnica monastery

Monastery information
- Full name: Манастир Враћевшница
- Order: Serbian Orthodox
- Established: 1428
- Dedication: Saint George
- Diocese: Eparchy of Žiča
- Controlled churches: Saint George

People
- Founder: Radič Postupović

Site
- Location: Vraćevšnica, Gornji Milanovac, Serbia

The Vraćevšnica Monastery (Serbian: Манастир Враћевшница, romanized: Manastir Vraćevšnica, pronounced [v̞rǎtɕɛːv̞ʃnitsa]) is a Serbian Orthodox monastery in Vraćevšnica, Gornji Milanovac, Serbia, built in 1428–29 on the orders of Radič (fl. 1389–1441), a magnate in the service of Stefan Lazarević and Đurađ Branković. It is part of the Žiča eparchate.

It was built in the Resava architectural style and dedicated to Saint George.

== See also ==
- List of Serbian Orthodox monasteries
