= Jevrem Obrenović =

Serbian revolutionary and politician (1790–1856)

Gospodar Jevrem Obrenović Grand Prince of Šabac
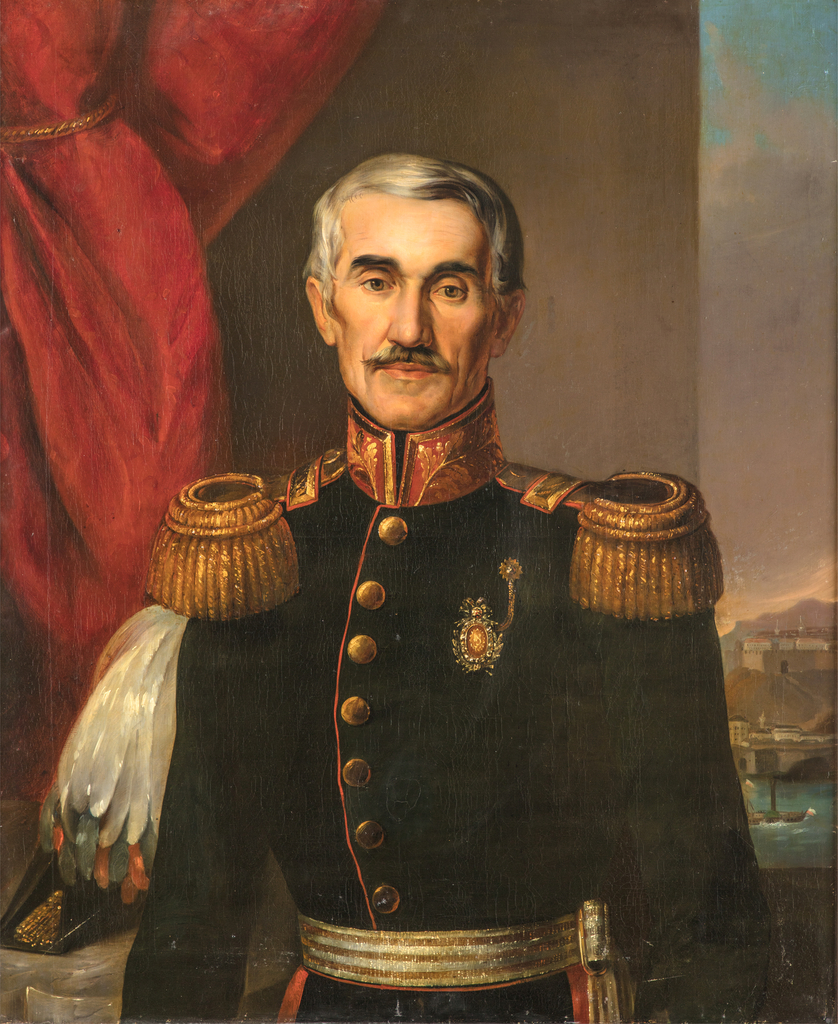

Regent of Serbia
- In office 25 June 1839 – 14 March 1840 Serving with Toma Vučić Perišić, Avram Petronijević
- Monarchs: Milan II; Mihailo III

Representative of the Prince of Serbia
- In office 1821 – 22 January 1826
- Monarch: Miloš I
- Preceded by: Petar Nikolajević Moler
- Succeeded by: Miloje Todorović

Personal details
- Born: 18 March 1790 Gornja Dobrinja, Ottoman Empire
- Died: 20 September 1856 (aged 66) Mărășești, Wallachia, Ottoman Empire
- Awards: Order of Glory
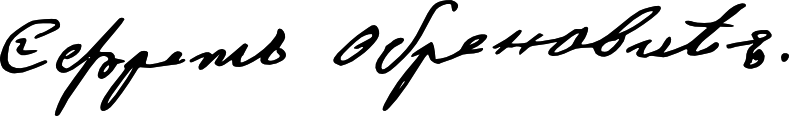
- Signature

Military service
- Allegiance: Revolutionary Serbia; Principality of Serbia
- Rank: General
- Battles/wars: First Serbian Uprising; Second Serbian Uprising; Russo-Turkish War (1828-1829)

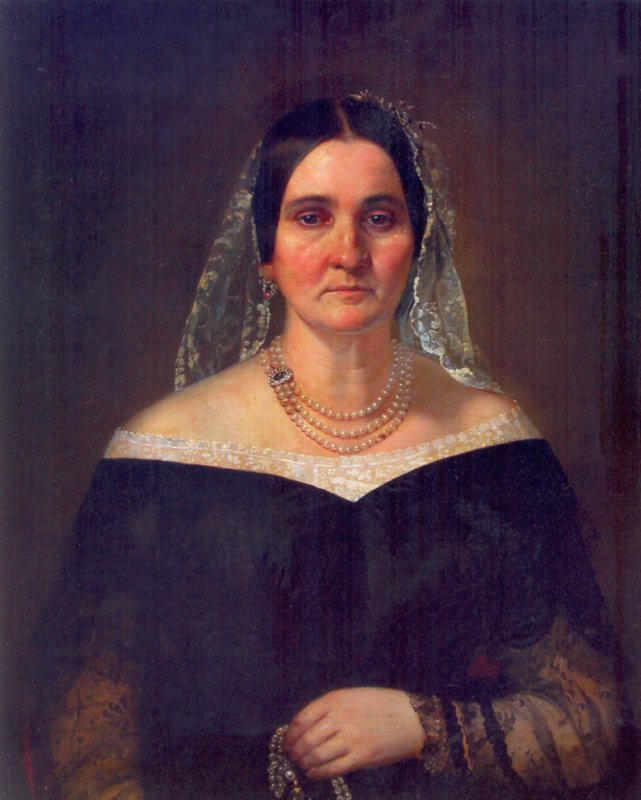
Jevrem's wife, Tomanija Bogićević

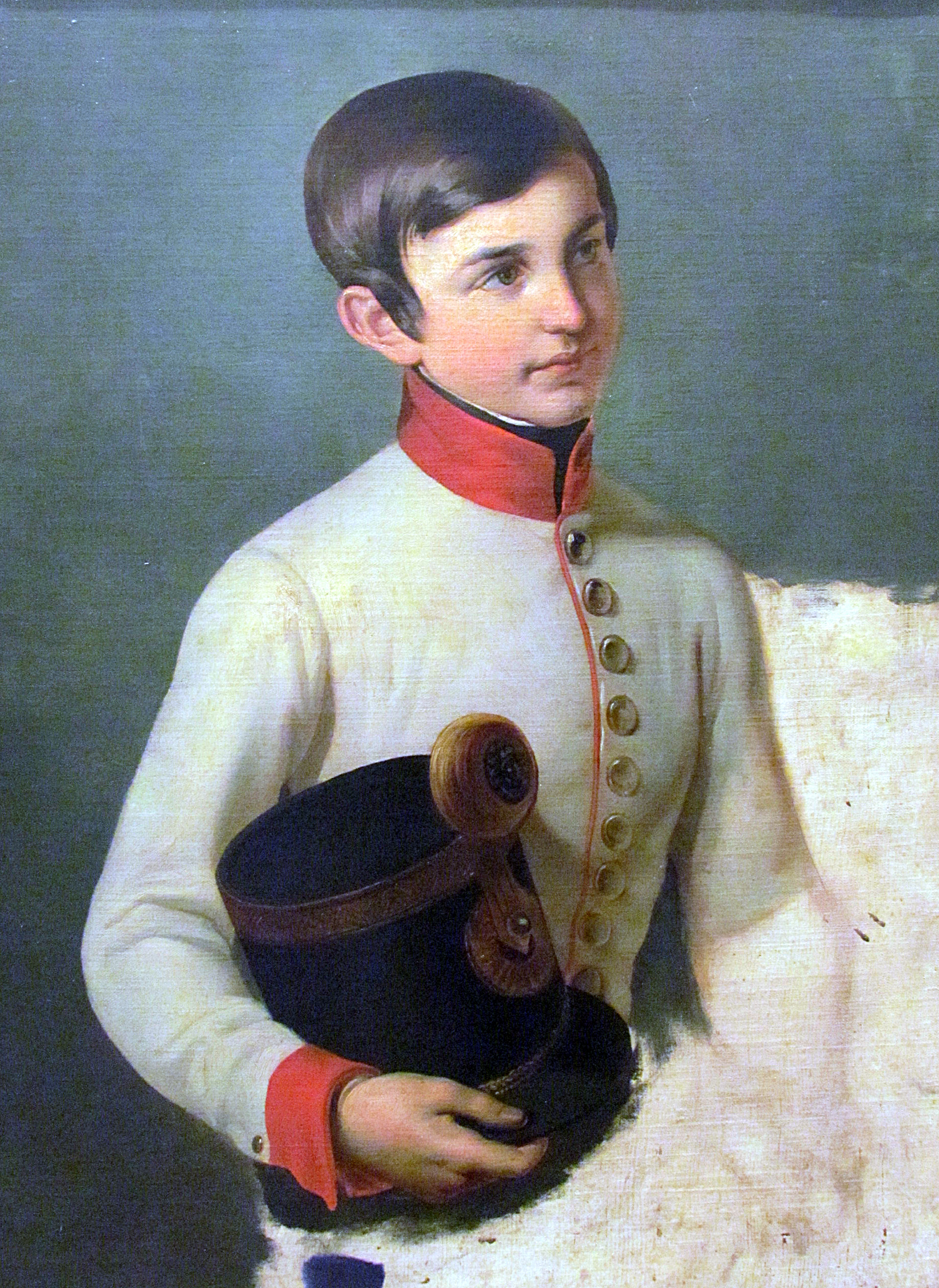
Jevrem's son Miloš, father of Milan I of Serbia

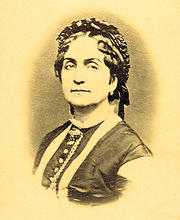
Jevrem's daughter Anka in Serbian national dress

Gospodar Jevrem Teodorović Obrenović, Grand Prince of Šabac (18 March 1790 – 20 September 1856) was a Serbian politician and revolutionary who served as Prime Minister of Serbia from 1821 to 1826. He was the younger brother of Prince Miloš Obrenović I of Serbia, the founder of the Obrenović dynasty.

== Early life ==
Jevrem's mother Višnja Urošević (d. 1817) was married twice, first to Obren Martinović, with whom she had three children. After the death of Obren, she married a poor widower, Teodor Mihailović, in the village of Dobrinja. Višnja and Teodor had three sons: Miloš, Jovan and Jevrem. Teodor Mihailović died in 1802, leaving the family in poverty. A few years later, the older brothers, Jakov and Milan, took their mother and half-siblings to live on their estate.

Milan Obrenović had a great influence on the upbringing and development of his two younger brothers; as evidenced by the fact that Miloš, Jovan and Jevrem took on their half-brother's surname Obrenović.

== Serbian Revolution ==
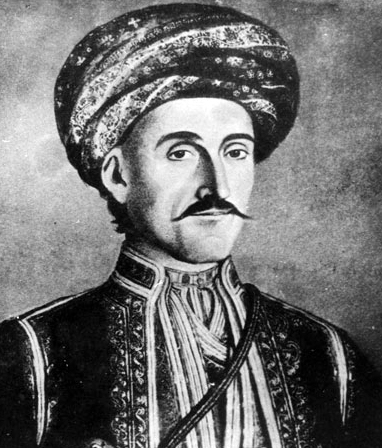
Obrenović in his younger years

Active in the Serbian independence movement from his youth, Jevrem travelled to Ostružnica to sell oxen for weapons and ammunition. He and his brother Miloš joined the First Serbian Uprising (1804–13), led by Karađorđe. Miloš conspired against Karađorđe and was involved in his assassination. During peacetime (1813–15), Jevrem lived for a while in Belgrade.

Miloš led the Second Serbian Uprising that broke out in the beginning of April 1815, and Jevrem again took up arms. Sulejman-paša Skopljak, the Vizier of Belgrade, had Jevrem captured and sentenced to death, but in August 1815 Miloš and the Ottoman governor Ali Pasha agreed to have Jevrem released from prison. In 1816, Miloš made Jevrem governor of the Šabac nahija (district); and in 1817 he was sent to govern the Sokol district. In 1817, Miloš concluded peace with the Ottomans and was recognized as the "Prince of Serbia" by the Ottoman Sultan, subject to tribute to the Porte. As such; Jevrem was in line to the succession to the Serbian throne behind his brother Jovan and the sons of Miloš.

== Later life ==
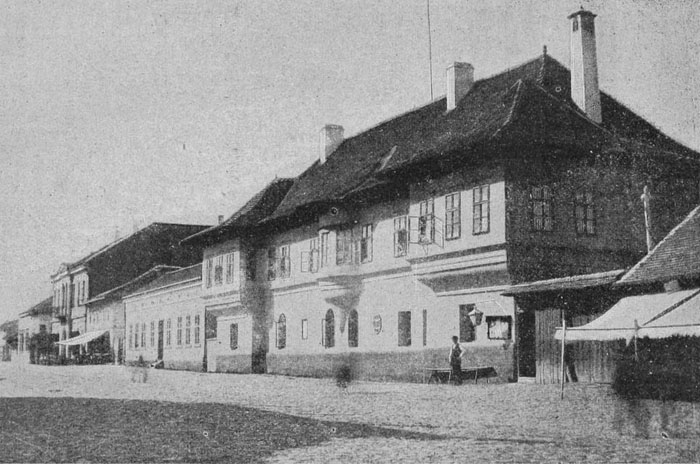
House of Jevrem Obrenović

In 1816, Jevrem married Tomanija Bogićević (1796–1881), the daughter of vojvoda Anta Bogićević (1750s–1813), with whom he had eight children - seven daughters (the eldest, Jelena, married Miloš's secretary Konstantin Hadija) and one son, Miloš Jevremov Obrenović.

In 1819, he was appointed governor of Valjevo. Jevrem ruled autocratically in the districts under his governance, decisions being made only with his consent.

Jevrem, as the younger brother of the ruler, had numerous responsibilities. His role in the organization and work of the nascent Serbian judiciary was of paramount importance. He was instrumental in combating banditry, which was especially rampant after 1817. Applying harsh, sometimes even cruel measures, Miloš and Jevrem managed to reduce brigandage to a reasonable level. In the period from 1817 to 1835, Jevrem participated in the suppression of several rebellions, during the Russo-Turkish War his task was to prevent the transfer of Ottoman troops from Bosnia through Serbia over to the eastern front. Until 1842, Jevrem at first secretly, but later publicly, fought for power. The opposition was able to remove Miloš from power, but then Jevrem realised that his chances of being elected Prince collapsed, and therefore committed his support to Miloš's second son Mihailo Obrenović III.

The town of Šabac, where Jevrem lived from 1816 until 1831, was completely modernized and "Europeanized" under Jevrem's auspices. His house, which was completed in 1824, was a multi-storey building of which "symmetry, architecture and beauty precedes all residences and palaces in Serbia." Understanding the importance of popular education, Jevrem built schools and invited many teachers, doctors, pharmacists, and artisans to the town. Šabac also had a well-stocked pharmacy with drugs valued at 5,000 pence. The same year, Jevrem also built the town hospital, and the first barracks with four departments, which could each accommodate 60 soldiers.

Jevrem headed a "literary circle" which included members archpriest Ignjat Savić, physician and writer Jovan Stejić, polymath Dimitrije P. Tirol, writer Princess Anka Obrenović and others. In 1829, he appointed Joseph Schlesinger the music teacher for his children. Schlesinger soon formed his own "music chapel" in the town. After a written order from Prince Miloš Obrenović in 1830 that the Serbian army needed military music, Schlesinger was on 1 June 1831 appointed kapellmeister of military music in Kragujevac.

Jevrem hosted many of the intelligentsia of Europe, and played a significant role in raising the general cultural level in the country. His library at his residence in Šabac, with the works of La Fontaine, Schiller and others, is among the richest in Serbia. Under Jevrem's auspices, the National Library of Serbia in Belgrade was founded in 1832.

After a long illness, Jevrem died at his home in Mărășești, Wallachia, on 9 September 1856.

== Sources ==
- Milićević, Milan (1888). Поменик знаменитих људи у српскога народа новијега доба. Srpska kraljevska štamparija. pp. 460–461. (Public Domain)

Government offices
Preceded by Petar Nikolajević Moler	Prime Minister of Serbia; 1821–1826	Succeeded by Miloje Todorović
