= Konstantin Hadija =

Serbian politician

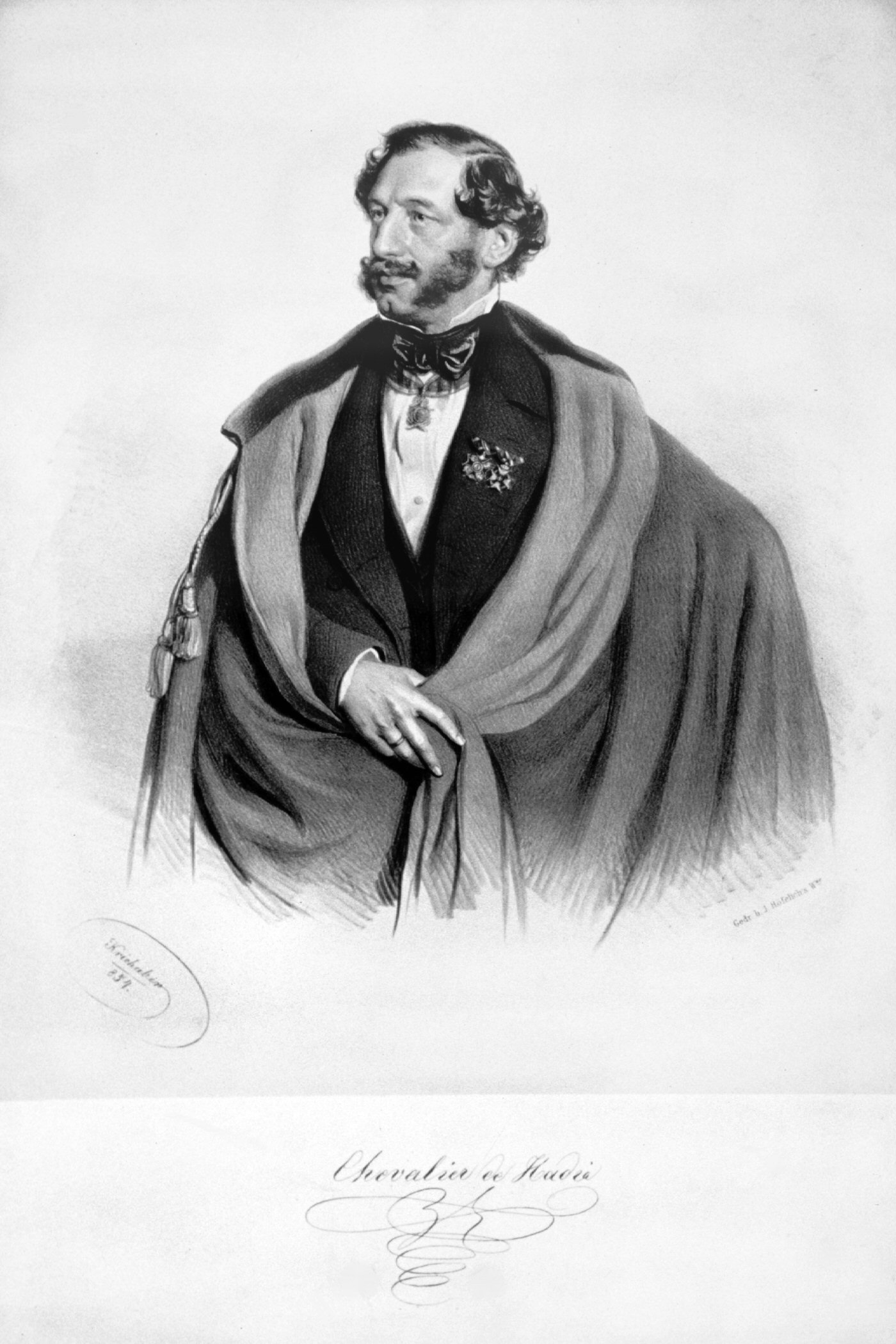
1854 lithograph by Josef Kriehuber (1800–1876).

Konstantin Hadija (Serbian Cyrillic: Константин Хадија; 1809–1888) was a Serbian politician serving as the secretary of Miloš Obrenović I, Prince of Serbia.

== Biography ==
Konstantin Hadija was born in Zemun, the younger son of Josif Hadija, his elder brother was named Josif. His grandfather Konstantin Hadija (born 1755), a Greek, moved to Zemun in 1800, from the town of Melnik (in modern-day Bulgaria), and owned a goldsmithing trade. His paternal grandmother was Franciska Kracajzen, the daughter of a brewery owner in Zrenjanin. The brewery was then owned by his grandfather Konstantin. His paternal uncles were Panajot and Konstantin (Kosta), and aunts Rozina, Terezija, Jelisaveta and Marija. His paternal cousin was Obrad Konstantinović, a voivode (military commander) in Jadar and father-in-law of Princess Anka Obrenović.

In 1834, he married Jelena Obrenović, the daughter of Jevrem Obrenović and Anka's eldest sister. They had a son Miloš, named after the Prince.
