= Katarina Konstantinović =

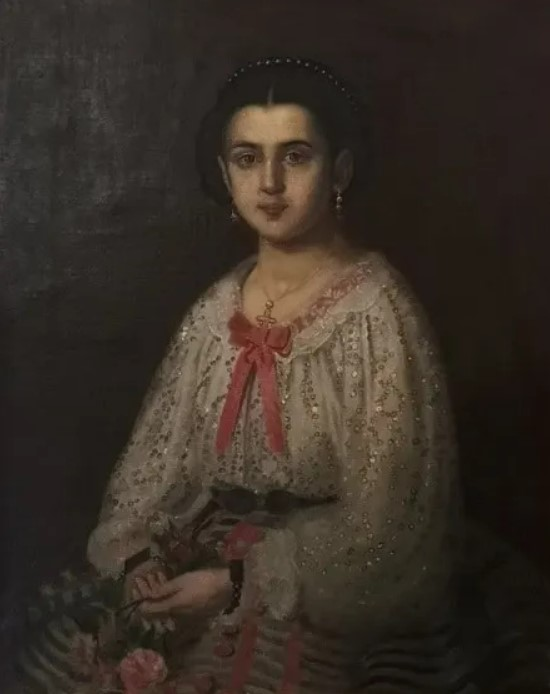
- Known for: Mistress of Mihailo Obrenović III
- Born: Katarina Konstantinović; 1848; Šabac, Principality of Serbia
- Died: 1910 (aged 61–62); Niš, Kingdom of Serbia
- Noble family: Obrenović dynasty (cognatic)
- Spouses: Milivoje Blaznavac (m. 1868; died 1873) Mihailo Bogicević
- Issue: Vojislav; Milica
- Father: Alexander Konstantinović
- Mother: Princess Anka Obrenović

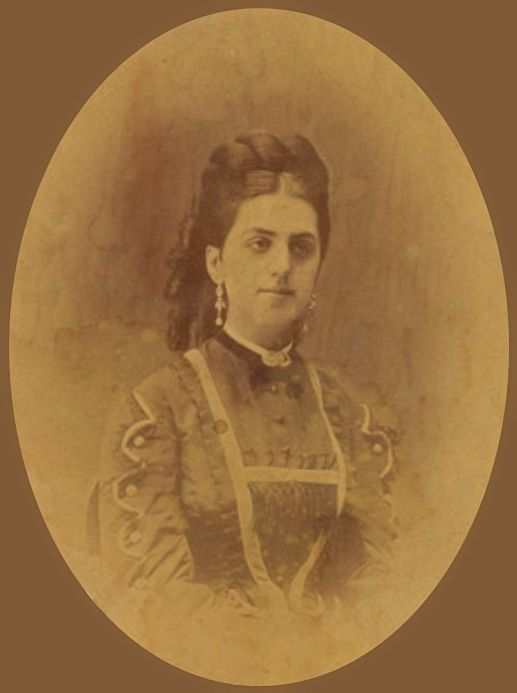
Photo of Katarina Konstantinović

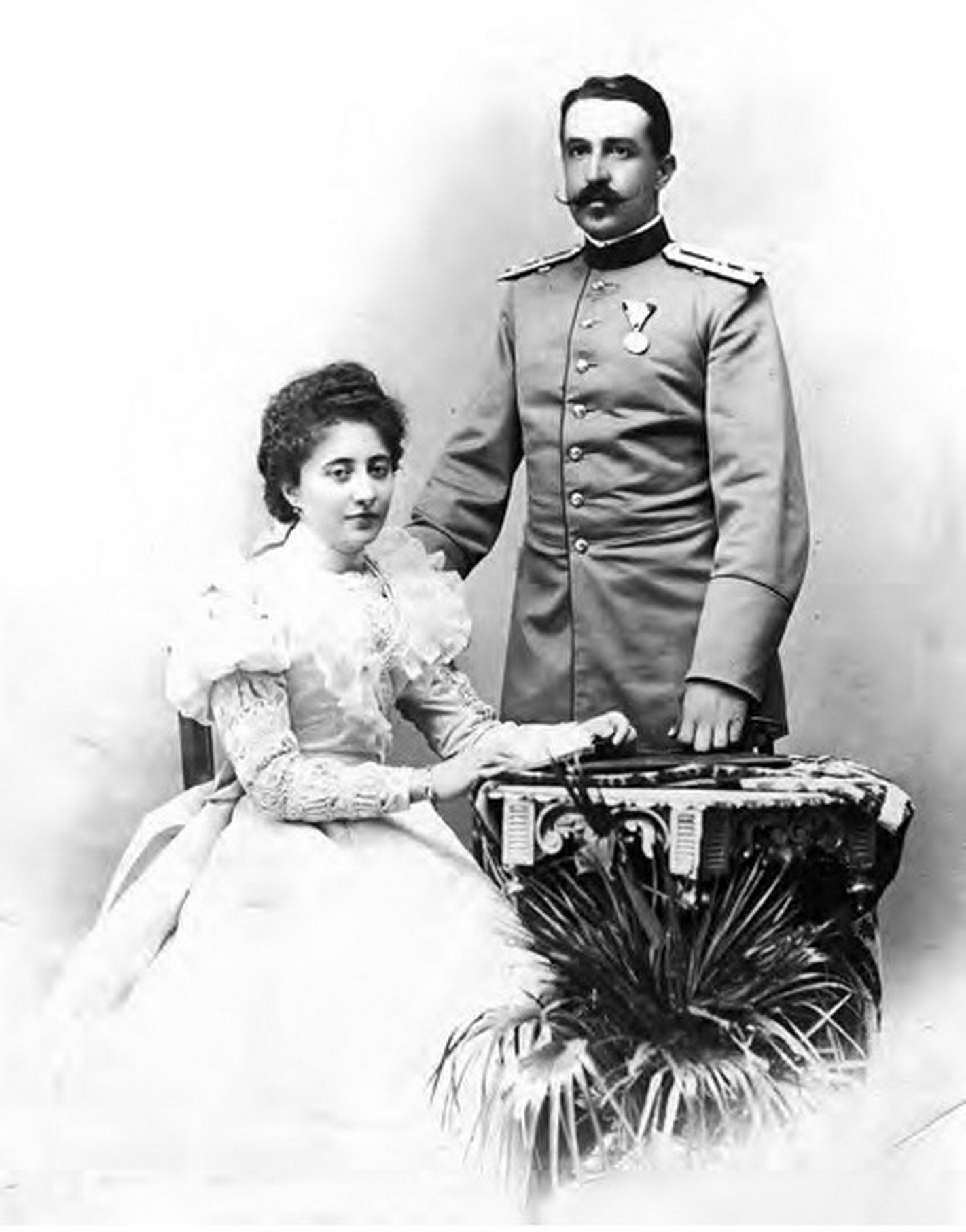
Katarina's son, Vojislav Blaznavac and his wife Danica Rašić, niece of Aleksa Spasić, Serbian Minister of Finance

Katarina Konstantinović (Serbian Cyrillic; Катарина Константиновић; 1848–1910) was a Serbian noblewoman and a descendant of the Obrenović dynasty as the daughter of Princess Anka Obrenović. She was also the first cousin of King Milan I to whom she acted as his de facto first lady of the royal court after the Queen, Natalie Keshko, separated from him.

Katarina married twice. Prior to her first marriage, she was the mistress of her cousin, the Serbian ruler, Prince Mihailo Obrenović III, who was considering a divorce from his childless wife Princess Julia to make Katarina his consort. On 10 June 1868, while she, Prince Mihailo and Princess Anka were strolling through Kosutnjak park near the royal country residence, assassins shot and killed her lover and mother, and left her wounded. That same year (1868) she married General Milivoje Blaznavac, by whom she had two children. Following his death in 1873, she married her cousin Mihailo Bogićević, Serbian Minister of Construction and two times Mayor of Belgrade.

== Family ==
Katarina was born in 1848, the daughter of Alexander Konstantinović and the erudite society leader Princess Anka Obrenović, the niece of Miloš Obrenović I, Prince of Serbia and the founder of the Obrenović dynasty. She had one brother, Colonel Alexander Konstantinović (died 1914) and an illegitimate half-sister, Simeona Lahovary (died 1915), born of her mother's relationship with her brother-in-law, Jovan Ghermani.

== Prince Mihailo ==
Sometime after her father's death, Katarina and her mother were invited by the latter's first cousin, Prince Mihailo to live at the royal court. Since September 1860, he had assumed rule as Serbia's leader for the second time, having been deposed in 1842 after a three-year reign. He was unhappily married to a Hungarian countess, Julia Hunyady de Kéthely, who was unable to bear children. Prince Mihailo and Katarina became lovers. Katarina did not bother to conceal her contempt for Princess Julia, and openly flaunted her affair with the prince. Mihailo wished to divorce his wife and marry Katarina, especially as Julia had her own lover, Duke Karl von Arenberg (1831-1896), cousin of Empress Sissi. While the Serbs made no secret of their mistrust of Julia due to her Catholic religion and Hungarian background, when the news spread of Mihailo's desire to seek a divorce in order to replace her with his second cousin, Katarina, the ordinary people as well as politicians and the clergy were all equally outraged at the prospect. One of the staunchest opponents of the divorce was Serbia's distinguished Prime Minister, Ilija Garašanin, who was dismissed from his post in 1867 for airing his objections to Mihailo's proposed divorce from Julia and marriage to Katarina. His dismissal brought about an angry protest from Russia.

Katarina's hopes to become Princess consort never came to fruition. On 10 June 1868, while she, Prince Mihailo, and her mother were taking a stroll through Košutnjak park near Mihailo's country residence on the outskirts of Belgrade, they were all shot by assassins, allegedly in the pay of the Karađorđevićs, who were the Obrenović's dynastic rivals to the Serbian throne; though it was never proven. Prince Mihailo was killed outright, Katarina was merely wounded, but her mother, after having bravely fought with her armed assailants, was also shot dead.

== Marriages and issue ==
That same year of 1868, Katarina, who was 20 years old at the time, married General Milivoje Blaznavac (16 May 1824- 5 April 1873), who served as Serbia's Minister of War and who was instrumental in securing the succession to the Serbian throne for Katarina's 14-year-old cousin Milan after commanding the Army to back the young Prince. The general, who acted as Milan's regent, was 24 years Katarina's senior and together they had a son, Vojislav (1869–1910) and a daughter, Milica, who died as a child.

Years later, when Prince Milan became King of Serbia, she acted as the first lady of the court due to his separation from his consort, Natalie.

General Blaznavac died in April 1873, and she married secondly her cousin, Mihailo Bogicević (1843–1899). They left Serbia and commenced a vagabond existence, living in various places throughout the Austro-Hungarian empire; however, they later returned to Belgrade, where he served as mayor from 4 April 1886 to 4 February 1887. She fell in love with a friend of her son, Vojislav, who was 18 years younger than her. She subsequently left her husband for her young lover, and she received financial support from her son as well as her wealthy half-sister, Simeona Lahovary (1858-1915), who was married to an important Romanian politician, Alexander Lakhovari (1841–1897) and served as a court lady to Queen Elizabeth of Romania.

Katarina died in 1910 in Niš, southern Serbia, where her son, Vojislav (1869-1935) was stationed as a soldier, and was buried in Belgrade. Her son was married to Danica Rašić (1878-1959), niece of Aleksa Spasić, Governor of the National Bank of Serbia and Minister of Finance. The marriage remained childless.

== Sources ==
- Cox, John K. (2002). The History of Serbia. Westport, Connecticut: Greenwood Press. ISBN 9780313312908.
- Hawkesworth, Celia (2000) (Google). Voices in the shadows: women and verbal art in Serbia and Bosnia. Budapest: Central European University Press
