= Milan Obrenović (revolutionary) =

(1767–1810), brother of Miloš Obrenović

Vojvoda Milan Obrenović Милан Обреновић
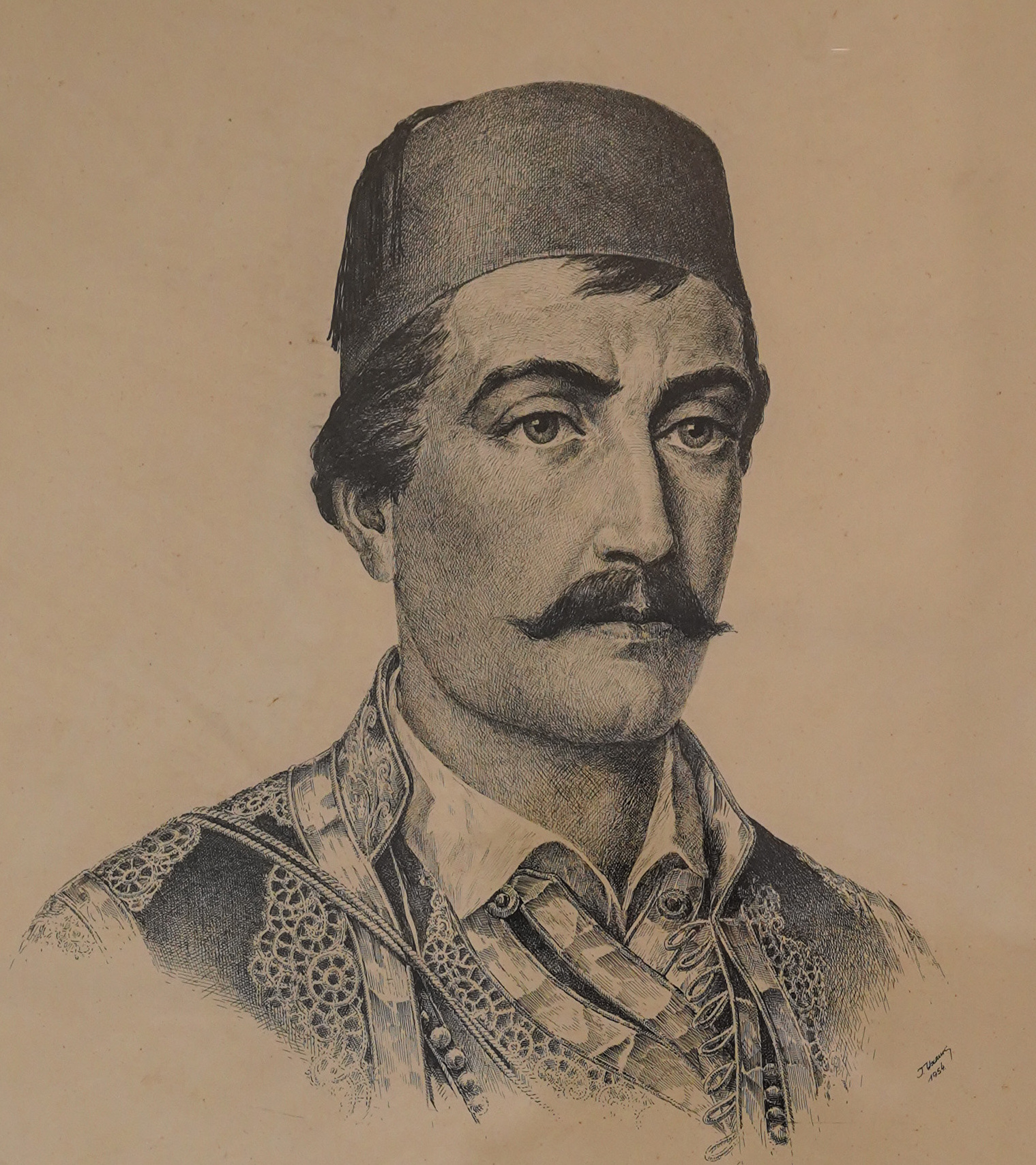
- Born: 1767; Brusnica, Ottoman Empire (present-day Serbia)
- Died: 16 December 1810 (aged 42–43); Bucharest, Principality of Wallachia, (present-day Romania)
- Military career
- Allegiance: Revolutionary Serbia
- Rank: General
- Conflicts: First Serbian Uprising

Milan Obrenović (Serbian Cyrillic: Милан Обреновић, c. 1770 – 16 December 1810) was a general (vojvoda) during the Serbian Revolution. He was the half-brother of Prince Miloš I of Serbia, Jovan Obrenović, and Jevrem Obrenović.

== Life ==
He was the youngest child of Obren Martinović (died 1777) and Višnja Urošević (died 1817), having a brother, Jakov (1767–1817), and a sister, Stana (born 1773). His mother remarried Theodore Mihailović (died 1802), at Dobrinje in the district of Užice, they had three sons: Miloš, Jovan (1786–1850) and Jevrem (1790–1856).

== Death ==
After Milan died on 16 December 1810, his half-brother Miloš adopted the surname Obrenović for him and his brother's legitimate agnatic descendants.
