= Miloje Todorović =

Serbian politician and prime minister

8th Prime Minister of Serbia
- In office 1826–1826
- Monarch: Miloš Obrenović
- Preceded by: Jevrem Obrenović
- Succeeded by: Dimitrije Davidović

Personal details
- Born: 1762 Crnče (Jagodina), Jagodina, Ottoman Empire (present-day Serbia)
- Died: 1832 (aged 69–70) Crnče, Jagodina, Principality of Serbia (present-day Serbia)

Miloje Todorović (Serbian Cyrillic: Милоје Тодоровић; 1762–1832) was a Serbian voivode and politician.

== Biography ==
Todorović participated in Koča's frontier rebellion and both the First Serbian Uprising and the Second Serbian Uprising. Due to great contributions he made in the First Serbian Uprising Karađorđe declared him a voivode. As a fluent speaker of Turkish and one of Serbia's most notable people. He was a part of Serbian delegation which came up with a peace treaty with the Ottoman Empire in 1815. For that achievement, sultan Mahmud II bestowed Todorović with silver sabre and other gifts. After the end of Serbian Revolution, Todorović held a number of public offices in the area of Civil law courts.

== See also ==
- List of Serbian Revolutionaries

Political offices
Preceded by Jevrem Obrenović	Prime Minister of Serbia; 1826	Succeeded by Mladen Milovanović
