= George Obrenović =

Pretender of the Serbian throne

- Pretender
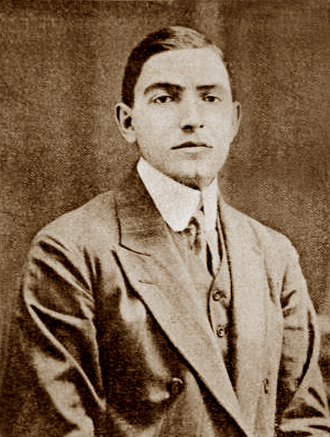
- George c. 1920
- Born: March 1890; Belgrade, Kingdom of Serbia
- Died: 9 October 1925 (aged 35); Hungary
- Title(s): Prince George Obrenović
- Throne(s) claimed: Serbia
- Pretend from: 11 June 1903
- Monarchy abolished: 1903¹
- Last monarch: Alexander I of Serbia
- Connection with: Half brother
- Father: Milan I of Serbia
- Mother: Artemisia Christich
- ¹ year House of Obrenović deposed

Milan George Obrenović (1889/March 1890 – 9 October 1925) born Obren Christić was the natural son of King Milan I of Serbia and his Greek mistress Artemisia Hristić (née Joanides). After the regicide of his half brother King Alexander in 1903 George became a claimant to the Serbian throne in opposition to the new king, Peter I Karadordevic before ending his life in obscurity.

== Birth and family background ==
Although commonly known as George Obrenović he was born in Belgrade as Obren Hristić. Acknowledged by King Milan as his son, he was given the name Obren at birth to underline his kinship to the ruling House of Obrenović. The husband of George’s mother was Milan Hristić, the king’s private secretary and son of the Serbian statesman Filip Hristić.

The relationship between the parents of George and the fact his mother was living in the Royal Palace, caused a great scandal and resulted in Queen Natalie fleeing Belgrade with her son Crown Prince Alexander for Wiesbaden in the German Empire. His mother’s husband was subsequently removed from his position as private secretary and sent abroad as Serbian Minister to Berlin on condition his wife stays in Belgrade. This appointment fell through however after the Berlin court made it clear he was unwelcome so he was instead sent to Rome. Although King Milan had given a written promise of marriage to Artemisia his attempts to divorce Queen Natalie were opposed by Mihailo, the Metropolitan of Belgrade.

Eventually both of George’s parents secured divorces from their respective spouses. Five months after his divorce on 6 March 1889 King Milan abdicated from the Serbian throne angering George’s mother. After eventually growing tired of ex-King Milan’s demands for money from her, Artemisa took George to live in Constantinople where her father lived and had acquired substantial wealth first as a landscape gardener and architect to the Ottoman sultan and later in Banking. Ex-King Milan then broke off his promise of marriage and turned instead to the Serbian government for financial assistance and was eventually even reconciled with his ex-wife Queen Natalie on 8 March 1893.

== Serbian pretender ==
With the breakdown of the relationship of his parents George was raised in a privileged environment by his mother in Constantinople. Following the death in 1901 of his father in exile in Vienna, George’s life changed. Some of his late father’s friends who were appalled by his half brother King Alexander’s treatment of King Milan took an interest in him as a possible candidate for the Serbian throne. One friend, the Hungarian count Eugene Zichy, assumed the role of his guardian. Count Eugene generally treated him as his own son and attempted to get the agreement of Emperor Franz Joseph I to enroll George in the Theresian Military Academy. However, as his pretensions to the Serbian throne were not viewed favourably in Vienna the emperor refused to allow his enrollment.

Although the natural son of King Milan, and even though his half brother and his consort Queen Draga were without an heir, George was not seen by his half brother as a possible successor to the throne. Instead the queens brother Nikodije Lunjevica and Prince Mirko of Montenegro, who was married to Natalija Konstantinović (granddaughter of Princess Anka Obrenović) were talked of as being named the heir.

After the regicide of his half brother King Alexander and his consort Queen Draga in 1903 the throne of Serbia was offered to Prince Peter Karageorgevich whose family had a decades long feud with the Obrenović’s over the throne. As the sole male line descendant of the Obrenović’s, George’s guardian Count Eugene claimed that his father King Milan had legally adopted him and as such this was enough to legitimise him, and his claims to the throne and make him the heir to his father and half brother. George had support within Serbia in the aftermath of the regicide with his supporters posting proclamations in Belgrade and fighting with supporters of the newly elected king, Peter Karageorgevich. Although there were reports that George and his mother were to cross over into Serbia nothing came of this and the Ottoman sultan advised his mother that he should be kept off the streets over fears that he would be assassinated.

In 1906, three years after the death of his half brother and the accession of King Peter Karageorgevich, George made an unsuccessful attempt to gain the throne of Serbia. In June while studying in Klausenburg, Hungary a dispute in a coffee shop led to a duel with swords being fought between George and a university student. Although he survived the duel he came off worse sustaining injuries to his head, shoulder and breast. He suffered a further blow at the end of that year when his guardian Count Eugene Zichy died on Boxing Day leaving George little in his will having used his own money to support his pretensions, as King Milan had left nothing to his son. All was not lost however as he still had a large inheritance to look forward to from his grandfather in Constantinople.

== Fall into obscurity ==
Back in the Ottoman capital in February 1907 George survived an assassination attempt when a man wielding a dagger attempted to stab him in his chest, however he escaped with just a scratch after the dagger hit a thick pocket book he was carrying. Five months later in July 1907 a bomb went off outside the US Embassy in Constantinople. As George lived in a house adjoining the embassy word spread that it was an assassination attempt by agents of King Peter Karageorgevich. This explanation for the bombing was met with some scepticism and viewed by some as an attempt to use the explosion to keep George in the public eye. The following month it was reported that he had attempted to take his own life after the Ottoman authorities had refused to allow him to assume the surname Obrenović. There may however have been other issues on his mind as an investigation into the bombing concluded that George had set it up himself to make it look like an attempt on his life. As a result, he was expelled from Turkey by the Sultan. The discovery also cost George his inheritance from his grandfather who was furious at his grandson's actions and wrote him out of his will. His grandfather died later that year before any chance for reconciliation could ever take place.

Now banished from Turkey George made his way to Paris before heading to Austria-Hungary where he received some support from his late father’s friends who saw the potential that he may one day ascend the Serbian throne. To help boost his finances failed attempts were also made to secure a rich wife from Austria-Hungary or America for him. When the support came to an end he largely disappeared from view travelling around Europe and falling into debt. Eventually he fell into comparative poverty and tried his hand at a number of different jobs to survive. After his attempt to work in the Austro-Hungarian state ministries failed due to his lack of qualifications, he worked at various jobs such as a stable boy and professional jockey before trying his hand at singing in cafés and on stage, until he was forced to abandon that career by the police due to the fact he had been billing himself as a prince. He then went on to work as a waiter, and a porter in sleeping cars on the Orient Express. His name reappeared in connection to his old pretensions during World War I when it was falsely reported in January 1916 that he had been proclaimed King of Serbia by the Germans and Austro-Hungarians.

George later went on to become a writer, however the only book he ever wrote, which was about the life of his father King Milan, was suppressed by the Serbian government. George Obrenović died penniless in a Hungarian poorhouse on 9 October 1925.

== Possible descendants ==
According to a 2003 article by the Serbian media company Novosti AD, George had a son called Stefan who served as a cavalry captain in the French Army. Stefan in turn had a son named Panta (Panka) Obrenović, who served as chairman of the "Fund Obrenović" until his death in Paris in early 2002. Panta had several children including a son named George Obrenović.
