= Baba Višnja =

Progenitor of the House of Obrenović

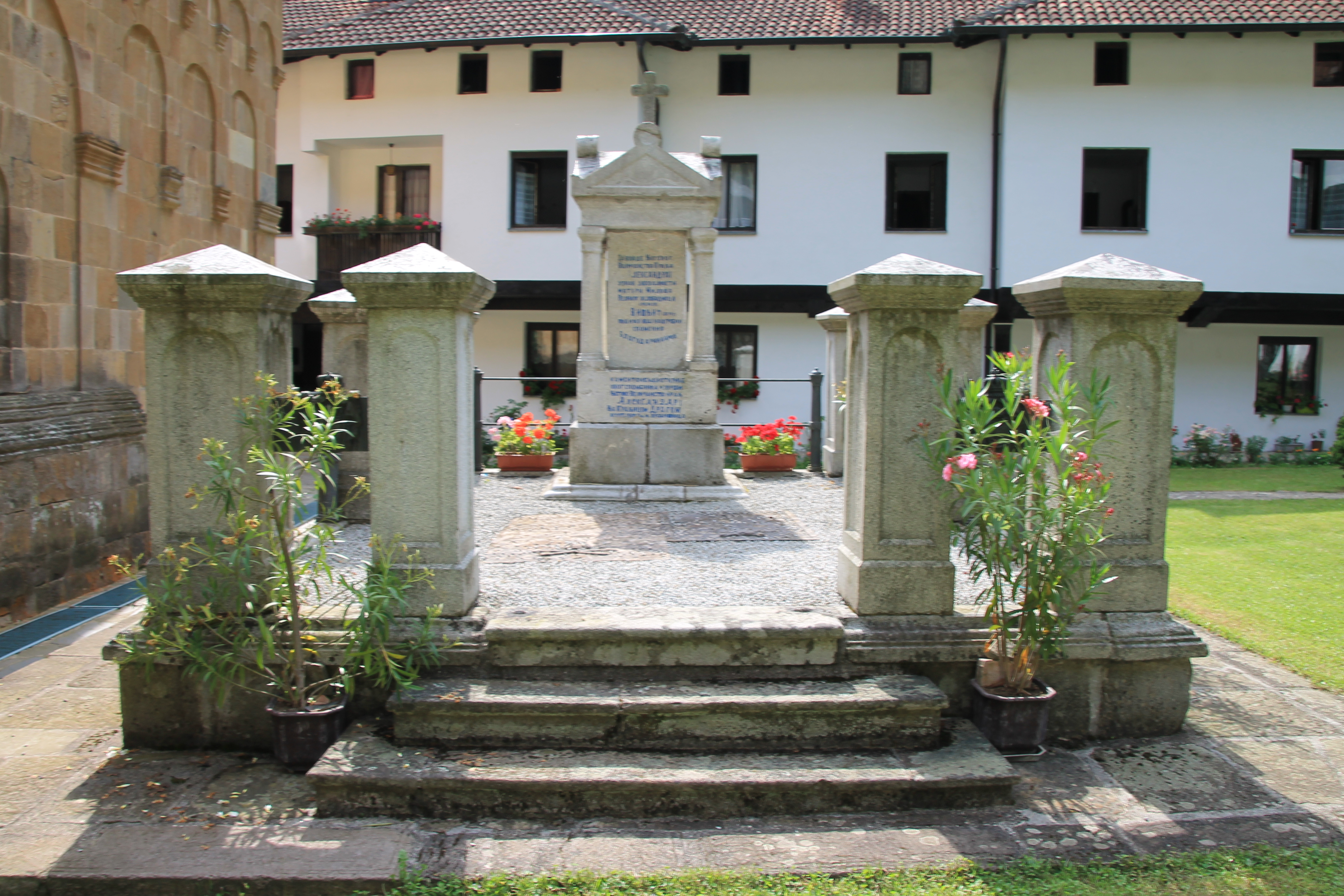
Baba Višnja's grave at Vraćevšnica monastery

Višnja Urošević (Serbian Cyrillic: Вишња Урошевић; 18th century – 1817), known as Baba Višnja (Serbian Cyrillic: Баба Вишња), is known as the mother of the Serbian ruler Prince Miloš Obrenović. She is considered the progenitor of the House of Obrenović.

== Biography ==
Višnja Urošević was born in Donja Trepča, presumably in the second half of the 18th century. Her first husband was Obren Martinović, from Brusnica, with whom she had two sons, Jakov and Milan, and a daughter, Stana. After Obren’s death she married Teodor-Teša Mihailović, from Srednja Dobrinja, with whom she had three more sons: Miloš, Jovan and Jevrem.

There is a street, dedicated on 1 January 1900, in Belgrade named after Baba Višnja.

Višnja is buried in the courtyard of the Vraćevšnica monastery near Gornji Milanovac.
