= Nichan Iftikhar =

Nichan Iftikhar (English: Order of Glory) may refer to one of the following orders:

- Order of Glory (Ottoman Empire)
- Order of Glory (Tunisia)
