= Ljubica Vukomanović =

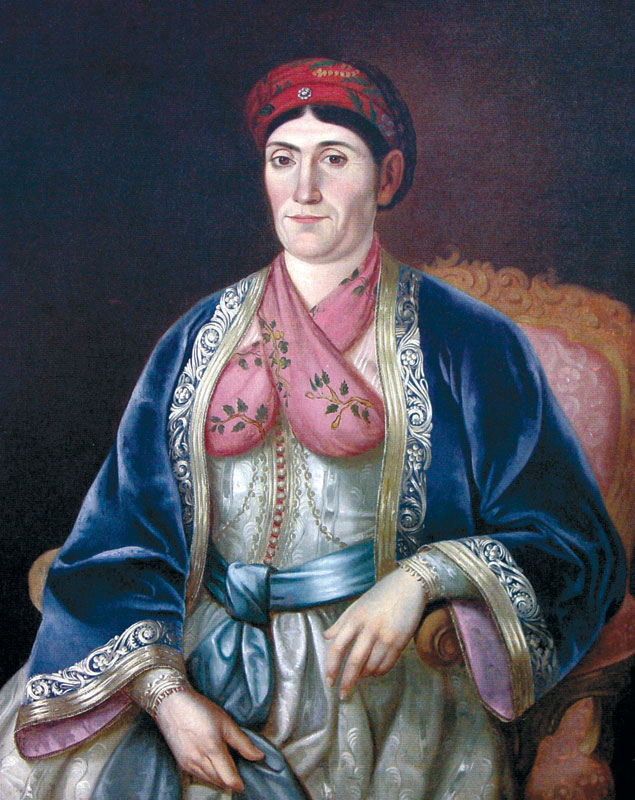
- Princess Ljubica in Serbian national costume

Princess consort of Serbia
- Tenure: 6 November 1817 – 25 June 1839
- Born: September 1788; Srezojevci, Serbia
- Died: 26 May 1843 (aged 54); Vienna, Austrian Empire
- Burial: Krusedol Monastery, Vojvodina
- Spouse: Miloš Obrenović I, Prince of Serbia (m. 1805; died 1843)
- Issue: Princess Petria; Princess Elisabeth; Prince Milan Obrenovic II; Prince Michael Obrenovic III; Princess Maria; Prince Todor; Prince Gabriel
- House: Obrenović
- Father: Radosav Vukomanović
- Mother: Marija Damjanović
- Religion: Serbian Orthodox

Ljubica Vukomanović (pronounced [ʎûbit͡sa ʋukomǎːnoʋit͡ɕ] Serbian Cyrillic: Љубица Вукомановић; September 1788 – 26 May 1843) was Princess consort of the Principality of Serbia as the wife of Miloš Obrenović, Prince of Serbia, and the founder of the Obrenović dynasty, which ruled Serbia in an almost unbroken line from the time of his election as Prince to the May Overthrow in 1903. Ljubica married Miloš in 1805 and became Princess of Serbia on 6 November 1817 until her husband's abdication on 25 June 1839. She had at least seven surviving children.

== Life ==
She was born in September 1788 in Srezojevci, Serbia, the daughter of wealthy farm owner (of the vlasteličići class) Radoslav Vukomanović and first wife Marija Damjanović; however, the exact date is unknown. In 1805 she married Miloš Obrenović, who on 6 November 1817 was elected the Prince of Serbia, making her Princess consort. Ljubica was active and influential in Serbian politics. Her marriage, however, was volatile, she often disagreed with her husband, and at one time they separated. Miloš was frequently unfaithful to her; and on one occasion she came close to killing one of his mistresses in a violent physical attack.

Between 1829 and 1830 Prince Miloš commissioned a fine city mansion to be built in Belgrade for Ljubica and their children. This is known as Princess Ljubica's Residence and was built by renowned Hadži-Neimar.

Her husband's rule was harsh and autocratic; in June 1839, he was compelled to abdicate the throne in favour of their eldest son, Milan, who died shortly afterwards. Milan was succeeded by their second son, Mihailo.

Ljubica died in Vienna on 26 May 1843 (New Style) (14 May O.S.), and was buried in the Krušedol Monastery on the Fruška Gora mountain.

=== Issue ===
Together, Miloš and Ljubica had at least seven children:

- Princess Petria (5 August 1810 – 1870), married in 1834 Todor Bajić de Varadija (ennobled in Austria Theodor Baich de Varadia)
- Princess Elisabeth (Savka) (28 March 1814 – 5 October 1848), married in 1831 Jovan Nikolić de Rudna (ennobled in Austria 1854 Freiherr Nicolic de Rudna, by whom she had three sons; her descendants married into the Austrian-Hungarian nobility.
- Prince Milan (21 October 1819 – 8 July 1839), died unmarried and childless after his brief reign.
- Prince Michael (16 September 1823 [N.S.] – 10 June 1868 [N.S.]), he ruled as Prince of Serbia from 8 July 1839 until his deposition on 14 September 1842; he assumed rule again from 26 September 1860 until his assassination eight years later alongside his first cousin Princess Anka Obrenović. Had no legitimate issue by his wife, Countess Julia Hunyady de Kéthely.
- Princess Maria (born and died 9 July 1830)
- Prince Todor (died young)
- Prince Gabriel (died young)
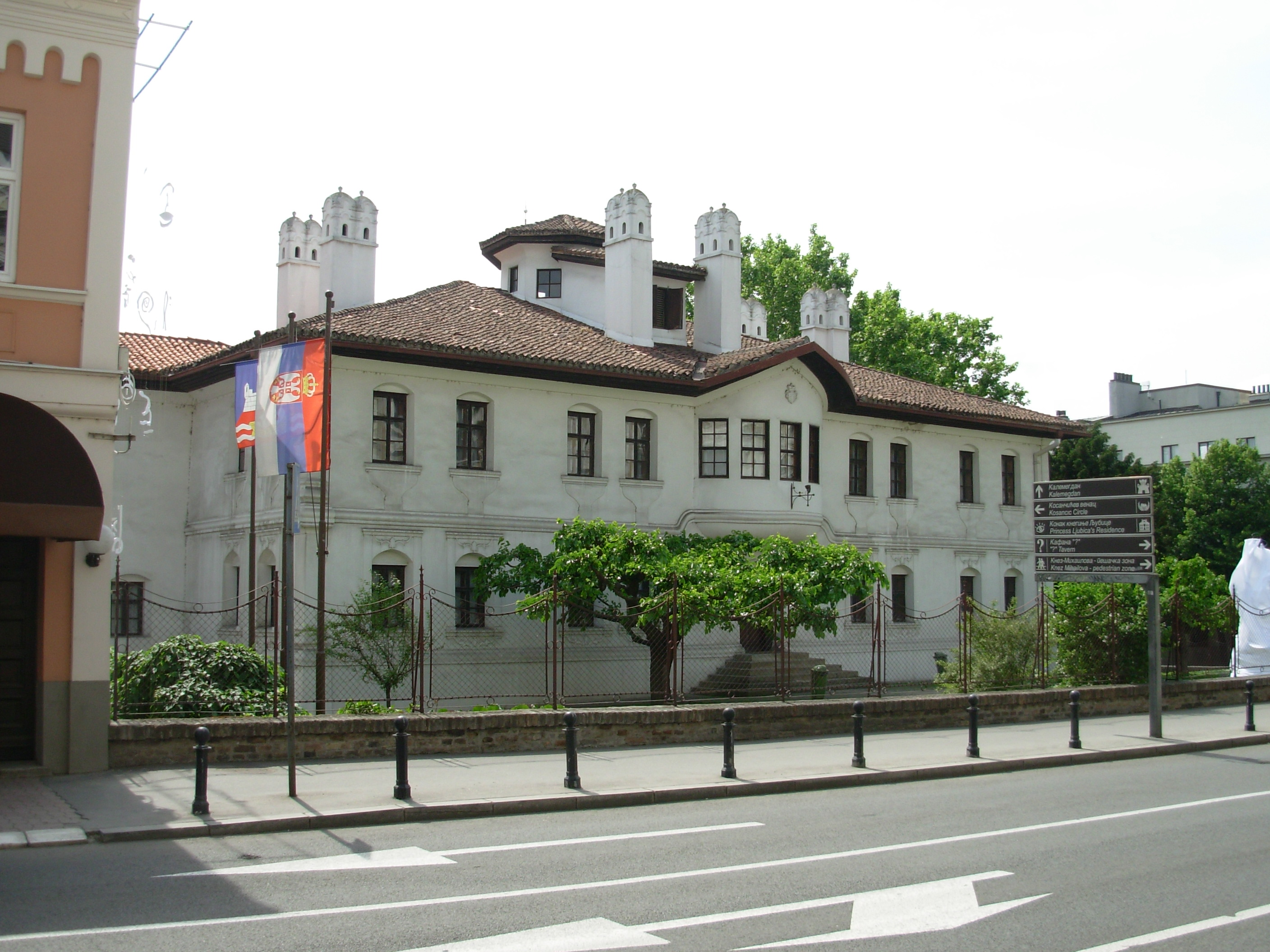
Princess Ljubica's Residence in Belgrade, the city mansion built by Prince Miloš for her and their children

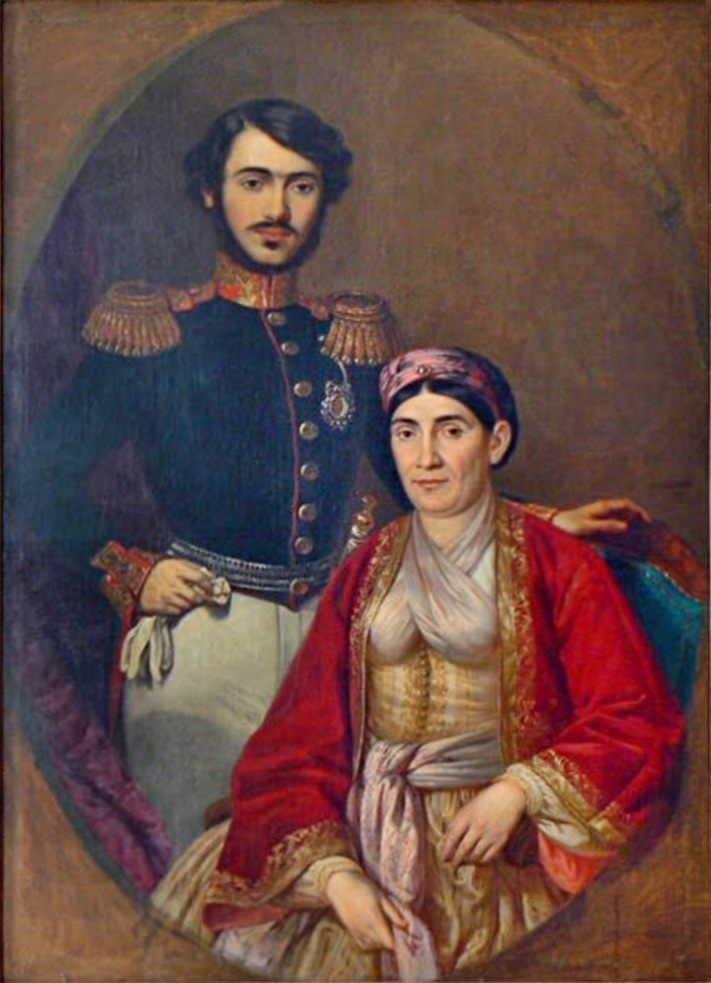
Princess Ljubica with her eldest son, Milan Obrenović II

== See also ==
- List of Serbian consorts
- Princess Ljubica's Residence

Royal titles
| Preceded by Jelena Jovanović; Grand Vožd's wife | Princess consort of Serbia; 6 November 1817 – 25 June 1839 | Succeeded by Persida Nenadović |
