= House of Obrenović =

Serbian royal family

House of Obrenović Династија Обреновића
- Great Pavilion Arms of the House of Obrenović
- Country: Principality of Serbia; Kingdom of Serbia
- Founded: 1815; 211 years ago
- Founder: Miloš I
- Final ruler: Alexander I
- Titles: Prince of Serbia; King of Serbia
- Deposition: 1903

The House of Obrenović or Obrenović Dynasty (Serbian: Династија Обрeновић, romanized: Dinastija Obrenović, pl. Обрeновићи / Obrenovići, pronounced [obrěːnoʋitɕ]) was a Serbian dynasty that ruled Serbia from 1815 to 1842, and again from 1858 to 1903.

They came to power through the leadership of their progenitor Miloš Obrenović in the Serbian Uprising of 1815–1817 against the Ottoman Empire, which led to the formation of the Principality of Serbia in 1817. The Obrenović dynasty were traditionally allied with Austria-Hungary and opposed the Russian-supported House of Karađorđević.

The family's rule came to an end in a coup d’état by the military conspirators, often known today as the Black Hand, who invaded the royal palace and murdered King Alexander I, who died without an heir. The National Assembly of Serbia invited Peter Karađorđević to become king of Serbia.

Like Montenegro and unlike other Balkan states such as Greece, Bulgaria, or Romania, Serbia did not import a member of an existing European royal family (mostly German dynasties) to take its throne; the Obrenović dynasty, like its Karađorđević rival, was an indigenous Serbian family.

== List of monarchs ==
Unlike most other dynasties in Europe, where a regnal number is used to distinguish different monarchs who shared the same given name, the Obrenović dynasty assigned subsequent regnal numbers to each ruling prince. Thus, there was never a Milan I, Milan III, a Michael I or a Michael II. Milan II and Michael III were simply the second and third ruling prince from the Obrenović dynasty. This practice was discontinued when prince Milan IV proclaimed himself king and declared the principality of Serbia a kingdom (1882).

Picture	Title Name	Birth	Reign	Spouse	Death	Claim	Notes
	^{Grand Vožd}^{Prince} Miloš I	18 March 1780 or 1783; Gornja Dobrinja near Požega, Ottoman Empire	23 April 1815 – 25 June 1839 (24 years, 63 days)	Ljubica Vukomanović	26 September 1860; Belgrade, Serbia, Ottoman Empire (aged 77 or 80)	Leader of the Second Serbian Uprising.	Abdicated.
	^{Prince} Milan II	21 October 1819; Kragujevac, Serbia	25 June 1839 – 8 July 1839 (13 days)	—	8 July 1839; Belgrade, Serbia (aged 19)	1st son of Miloš I and Ljubica Vukomanović	Died in office.
	^{Prince} Michael III	16 September 1823; Kragujevac, Serbia	8 July 1839 – 14 September 1842 (3 years, 68 days)	Júlia Hunyady de Kéthely	10 June 1868; Belgrade, Serbia (aged 44)	2nd son of Miloš I and Ljubica Vukomanović	Deposed by the Defenders of the Constitution.
Out of power for 16 years, 100 days.
	^{Prince} Miloš I	18 March 1780 or 1783; Gornja Dobrinja, Ottoman Empire	23 December 1858 – 26 September 1860 (1 year, 278 days)	Ljubica Vukomanović	26 September 1860; Belgrade, Serbia, Ottoman Empire (aged 77 or 80)	Elected by the National Assembly.	Died in office.
	^{Prince} Michael III	16 September 1823; Kragujevac, Serbia	26 September 1860 – 10 June 1868 (7 years, 258 days)	Júlia Hunyady de Kéthely	10 June 1868; Belgrade, Serbia (aged 44)	Son of Miloš I and Ljubica Vukomanović	Assassinated in Belgrade.
	^{Prince;}^{King} Milan IV; Milan I	22 August 1854; Mărășești, Moldavia	10 June 1868 – 6 March 1889 (20 years, 269 days)	Natalie Keshko	11 February 1901; Vienna, Austria-Hungary (aged 46)	Elected by the National Assembly. Cousin of Mihailo III.	Milivoje Blaznavac acted as regent until the age of majority. Abdicated.
	^{King} Alexander I	14 August 1876; Belgrade, Serbia	6 March 1889 – 11 June 1903 (14 years, 97 days)	Draga Mašin	11 June 1903; Belgrade, Serbia (aged 26)	Son of Milan I and Natalie Keshko	Jovan Ristić acted as regent until the age of majority. Assassinated in Belgrade.

== Male descendants of Baba Višnja ==
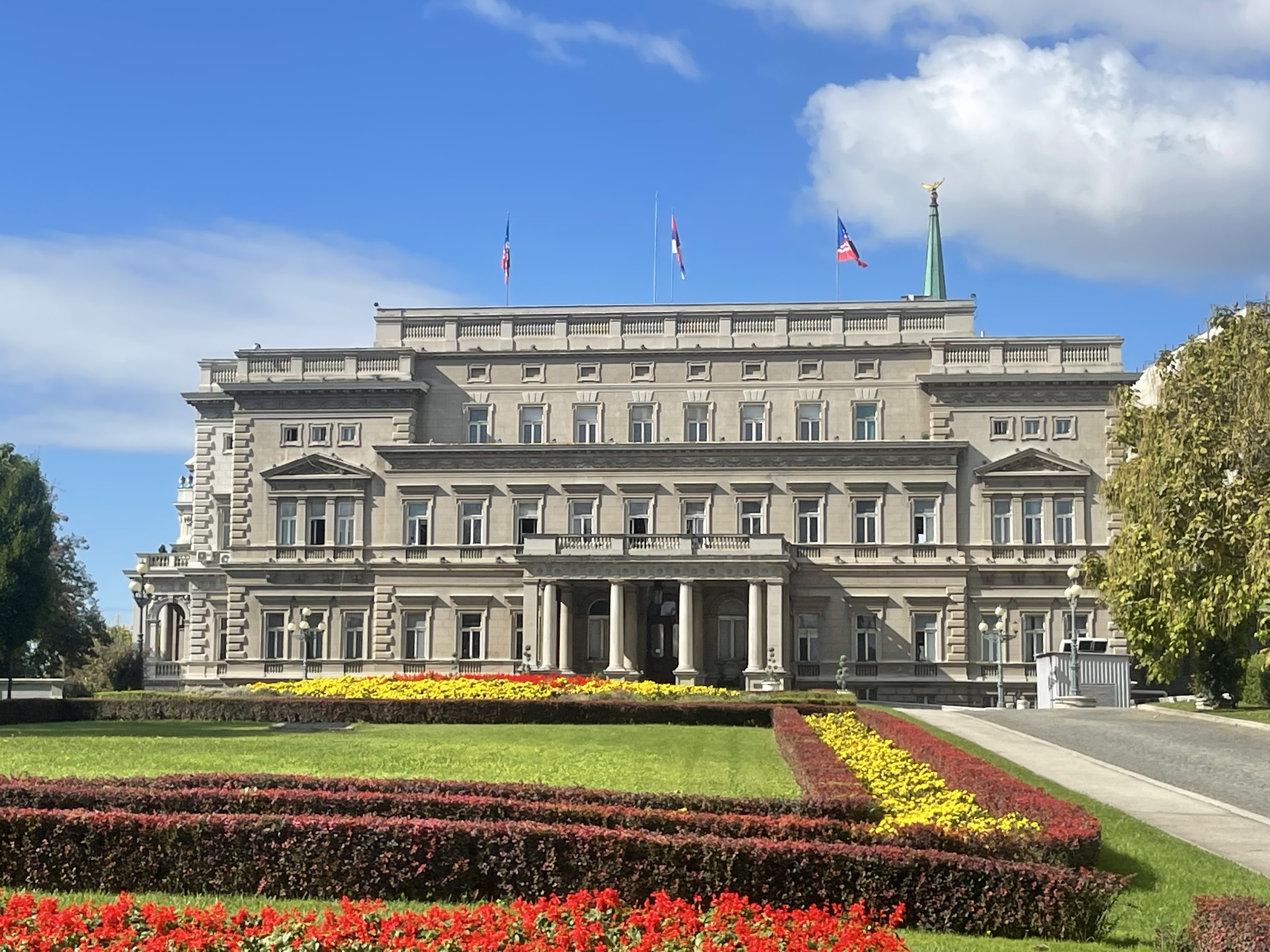
Stari Dvor royal residence, Belgrade

- Baba Višnja (1737–1817)
    - Jakov Obrenović (1767–1811)
      - From whom are descended the Jakovljevićs, among whom some self-proclaimed themselves as princes in the 2010s.
    - General Milan Obrenović (c.1770–1810)
      - Hristifor Obrenović (N/a–1825)
    - Prince Miloš I (1783–1860)
      - Prince Milan II (1819–1839)
      - Prince Mihailo III (1823–1868)
        - (illegit.) Velimir Mihailo Teodorović (1849–1898)
      - Prince Todor (N/a)
    - General Jovan Obrenović (1786–1850)
      - Obren Obrenović (1818–1826)
    - Prince Jevrem (1790–1856)
      - Miloš Obrenović (1829–1861)
        - King Milan I (1854–1901)
          - King Alexander I (1876–1903)
          - Prince Sergei (1878–1878)
          - (illegit.) George Obrenović (1890–1925)
            - Stefan Obrenović (N/a)
              - Panta Obrenović (1945–2002)

== Other family members ==
- Ljubica Vukomanović, wife of Prince Miloš I and mother of Prince Milan II and Prince Michael III
- Princess Anka Obrenović, daughter of Prince Jevrem Obrenović
- Katarina Konstantinović, daughter of Princess Anka Obrenović and mistress of her cousin, Prince Michael III
- Júlia Hunyady de Kéthely, wife of Prince Michael III
- Natalia Konstantinović, granddaughter of Princess Anka Obrenović and wife of Prince Mirko of Montenegro
- Elena Maria Catargiu-Obrenović, mother of King Milan I
- Queen Natalie of Serbia, wife of King Milan I and mother of King Alexander I
- Queen Draga of Serbia, wife of King Alexander I and former lady-in-waiting to his mother
- Baron Fedor Nikolić, Civil Governor of Bosnia and Herzegovina and member of the Hungarian House of Magnates

== See also ==
- List of Serbian monarchs
