= Order of Osmanieh =

Civil and military decoration of the Ottoman Empire

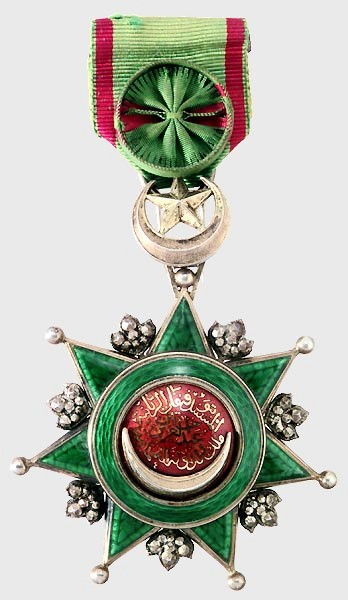
- Fourth Class Order of Osmaniya
- Type: Order
- Awarded for: Outstanding services to the state
- Country: Ottoman Empire
- Presented by: Ottoman Sultan
- Eligibility: Civilians and military
- Clasps: Swords for World War I
- Status: No longer awarded
- Established: January 1862
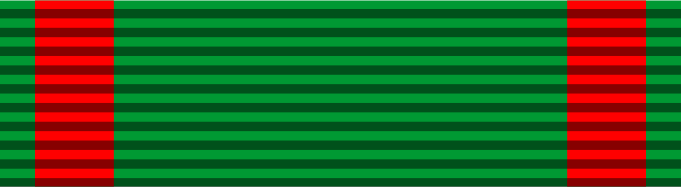
- Ribbon bar of the medal

Precedence
- Next (higher): Order of Glory (until 1862); Order of Distinction (after 1862)

The Order of Osmanieh (Ottoman Turkish: نشانِ عثمانیه, Modern Turkish: Osmaniye Nişanı) was a civil and military decoration of the Ottoman Empire.

== History ==
The order was created in January 1862 by Sultan Abdülaziz. With the obsolescence of the Nişan-i Iftikhar, this became the second highest order in the Empire, ranking below the Nişan-i Imtiyaz. It was awarded by the Sultan to Ottoman civil servants and military leaders for outstanding services to the state. Generally, it could not be awarded to women, but exceptions appear to have been made at the Sultan's discretion. The order was originally established in three classes. In 1867 the order was expanded to four classes, plus an augmented first class set with brilliants or diamonds (This does not include the awards with sabers, which were not separate classes, but did constitute separate awards). The order was restricted (for Turkish recipients) to 50 members of the first class, 200 members of the second class, 1000 of the third class, and 2000 of the fourth class. Originally, one could not receive the first class of this order without having first been decorated with the First Class of the Order of the Medjidie, but during the 33-year reign of Abdulhamid II, most of these restrictions were ignored and the first class of both orders were awarded liberally. A fifth class was added in 1893.

From 1915 until the end of the First World War, all classes could be awarded with sabers when awarded for achievements in military operations.

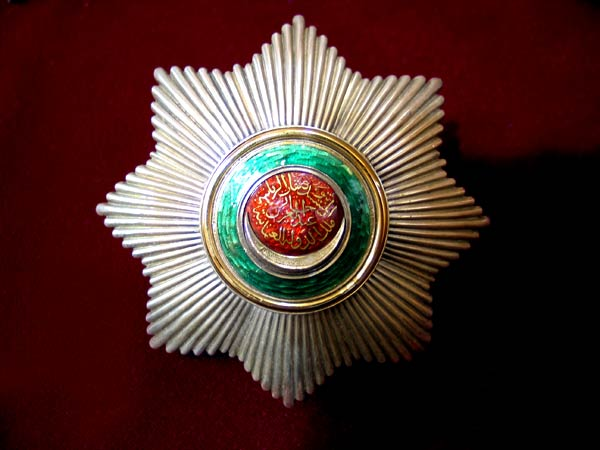
Badge of the Order

== Description ==
The badge of the order is a seven pointed star in dark green enamel, with three short silver rays between each point of the star. The center medallion is in gold, with a red enameled field surrounded by a green enameled band. In the red central portion is a raised gold crescent, and a calligraphic inscription reading "Relying on the Assistance of Almighty God, Abdulaziz Khan, Sovereign of the Ottoman Empire". The reverse center medallion is silver, bearing a trophy of arms and the year AH. 699, the year of the creation of the Ottoman Empire. The badge is suspended by a gold crescent and star, facing upwards. The star of the order bears the same obverse center medallion superimposed on a silver seven pointed star of faceted rays. A star of the first class typically measures about 100 mm, while that of the second class measures about 90 mm across, with the Ottoman mint mark on the reverse.
