= Order of Distinction (Ottoman Empire) =

Order of Distinction نشانِ امتیاز
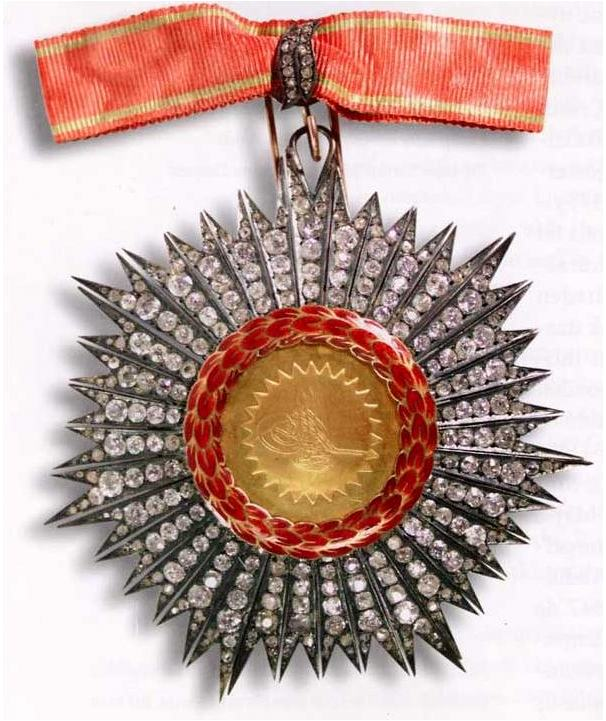
- Type: Order of Merit
- Awarded for: Outstanding services
- Country: Ottoman Empire
- Presented by: Ottoman Sultan
- Status: No longer awarded
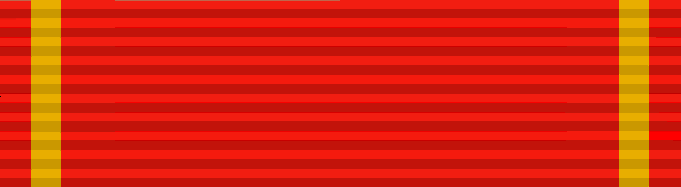
- Ribbon bar of the order

Precedence
- Next (higher): Not applicable (this was the highest order)
- Next (lower): Order of Glory (until 1862); Order of Osmanieh (after 1862)

The Nishan-e-Imtiaz or Order of Honour (Ottoman Turkish: نشانِ امتیاز) was an order of the Ottoman Empire founded by Sultan Abdulmejid I. It was a higher honor than the Order of Glory and given to reward merit and outstanding services. It was revived on 17 December 1878 by Sultan Abdul Hamid II. This was the highest order in the Ottoman Empire.
