= Milan Obrenović, Prince of Serbia =

Prince of Serbia in 1839

Milan Obrenović II Milan Obrenović II Милан Обреновић II
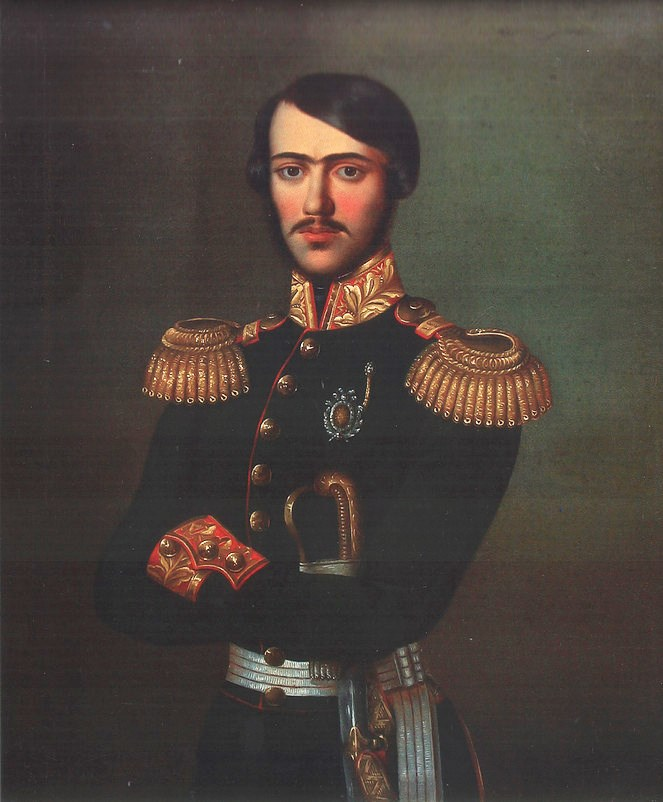
- Portrait c. 1830s

Prince of Serbia
- Reign: 25 June 1839 – 8 July 1839
- Predecessor: Miloš Obrenović I
- Successor: Mihailo Obrenović III
- Co-Regents: Jevrem Obrenović; Toma Vučić Perišić; Avram Petronijević
- Born: 21 October 1819; Kragujevac, Serbia
- Died: 8 July 1839 (aged 19); Belgrade, Serbia
- Burial: Church of Saint Mark, Belgrade
- House: House of Obrenović
- Father: Miloš Obrenović
- Mother: Ljubica Vukomanović
- Religion: Serbian Orthodox
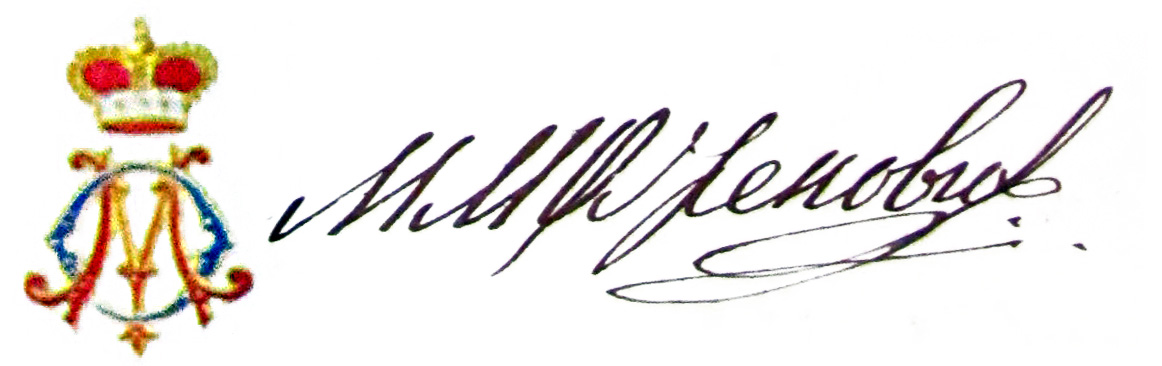
- Signature

Milan Obrenović II (Serbian Cyrillic: Милан Обреновић II, romanized: Milan Obrenović II) (21 October 1819 – 8 July 1839) was the ruling Prince of Serbia for just four weeks in 1839. By birth, he was a member of the House of Obrenović.

== Early life ==
Milan Obrenović was the eldest son and heir of Miloš Obrenović I, Prince of Serbia and his wife, Princess Ljubica. He was ill from his earliest childhood and his health was poor throughout his entire life from tuberculosis. He was a student of the Belgrade Higher School, modern-day University of Belgrade. He had a full curriculum of study, including French and German languages. In 1830, when the Principality of Serbia obtained its autonomy, Milan Obrenović became the Crown Prince of Serbia and designated heir of his father.

== Prince of Serbia ==
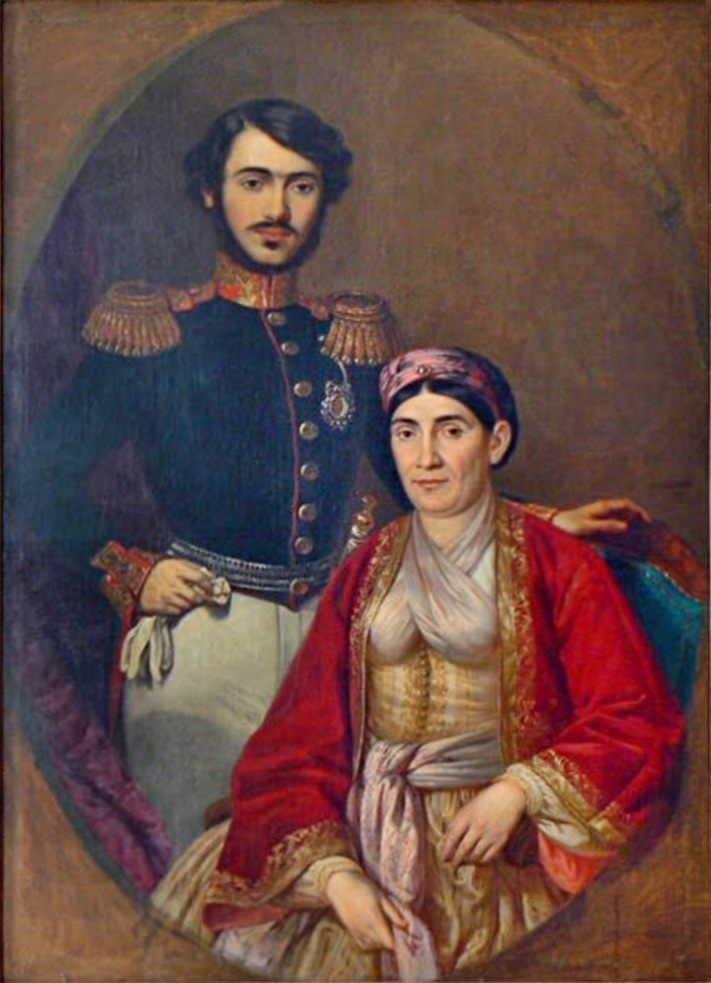
Milan with his mother Ljubica Vukomanović, painted by Stevan Todorović (1882)

His father Miloš Obrenović I abdicated on 13 June 1839 in favour of Milan. However, by then, Milan was already gravely ill with tuberculosis. After his father's resignation, all the officials present went to congratulate him on becoming Prince. It was published in the official newspaper of the Principality of Serbia. After that, Milan was visited by officers led by Ilija Garašanin. Garašanin introduced the officers to the new prince with the words: "My lord, the officers have come to bow to you, and to declare their loyalty and devotion to Your Highness." From his bed, Milan replied: "I thank the gentlemen officers for their loyalty, and I, for my part, assure the officers that I will make sure, in agreement with the Soviet, that the condition of the officers will improve. If God allows me to recover soon, I will invite you, gentlemen, to Topčider for lunch." Prince Milan had never married, nor did he have any known children. Since his rule lasted only 26 days, no public documents were officially issued under his name. His death caused political crisis, and due to that, the "first regency" was formed in Serbia and lasted until 1840.

== Death ==
He died on 8 July 1839 in Belgrade, aged 19, having never regained consciousness. After his death, his younger brother Mihailo Obrenović succeeded to the throne. Milan II was buried in the church of Palilula, and later his grave was moved to Church of Saint Mark in Belgrade.

== See also ==
- List of Serbian monarchs

Milan Obrenović, Prince of Serbia House of Obrenović Born: 21 October 1819 Died: 8 July 1839
Regnal titles
Preceded by Miloš Obrenović I	Prince of Serbia; 25 June 1839 – 8 July 1839	Succeeded by Mihailo Obrenović III
