= Jovan Obrenović =

Serbian general and politician

Jovan Obrenović Јован Обреновић
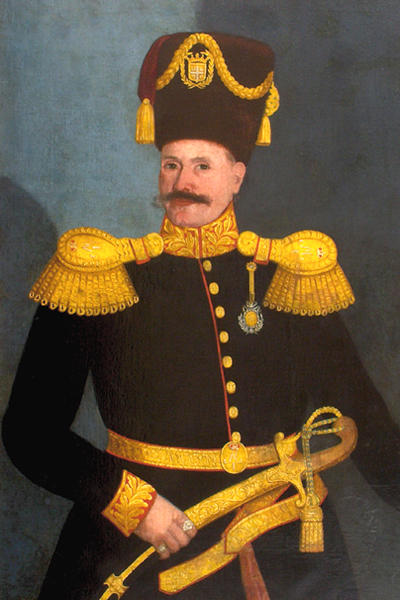
- Portrait of Obrenović by Uroš Knežević, 1836
- Born: c. 1787; Srednja Dobrinja, Sanjak of Smederevo, Ottoman Empire
- Died: 22 January 1850; Sremski Karlovci, Slavonian Military Frontier, Habsburg Empire
- Military career
- Allegiance: Principality of Serbia
- Branch: Army of the Principality of Serbia
- Service years: 1815–1839
- Rank: Divizijar
- Wars: Second Serbian Uprising; Battle of Ljubić
- Awards: Order of Glory

Jovan Teodorović Obrenović (c. 1787 – 22 January 1850), also known as Gospodar Jovan, was a Serbian divisional general, commander of the Morava-Podrinje military area, governor of the Rudnik and Požega districts. He was the brother of Miloš Obrenović and Jevrem Obrenović.

== Biography ==
He was born in Srednja Dobrinja (near Užice) around 1787 to his mother Višnja and father Todor Mihailović Obrenović. He was Miloš Obrenović's youngest brother, after Jevrem Obrenović. Jovan took part in the Meeting in Takovo and the Battle of Ljubić with Lazar Mutap in 1815. He also took part in the suppression of the Đak rebellion in 1825. His clerk in Brusnica was Nićifor Ninković (also Kara-Marko Vasić's clerk at one time) from 1828. He built a church in Brusnica in 1836. The Jovan rebellion from 1839 was named after him. Together with Jevrem Obrenović, he opposed the Miloš Obrenović administration during the political turmoil from 1839 to 1842.

He married Kruna Mihailović in 1814 and had a son Obren (1818-1826) and a daughter Jelisaveta Savka (1828-1834) with her. He entered into a second marriage in 1835 with Ana Joksić (1818-1880) and had two daughters with her - Anastasia Stana (1839-1933) and Ermila (1844-1918). Anastasia was married in 1858 to Teodor Aleksić of Maïna (1825—1891). Ermila was married to Nikola Čupić in 1860, and in 1867 to Tihomilj Tesa Nikolić (1832-1886).

He was a divisional general and military commander of the Morava-Podrinje region during and after the Second Serbian Uprising.

After Toma Vučić Perišić's unsuccessful revolt against Miloš Obrenović in 1842, he moved to Austria.

Jovan Obrenović died on 22 January 1850 in Sremski Karlovci.

In his residence from 1835, there is a permanent exhibition of the National Museum in Čačak. He was credited with the renovation of the Church of the Ascension of the Lord in 1834 in Čačak.
