= Anka Obrenović =

Serbian socialite and writer (1821–1868)

- Princess of Serbia
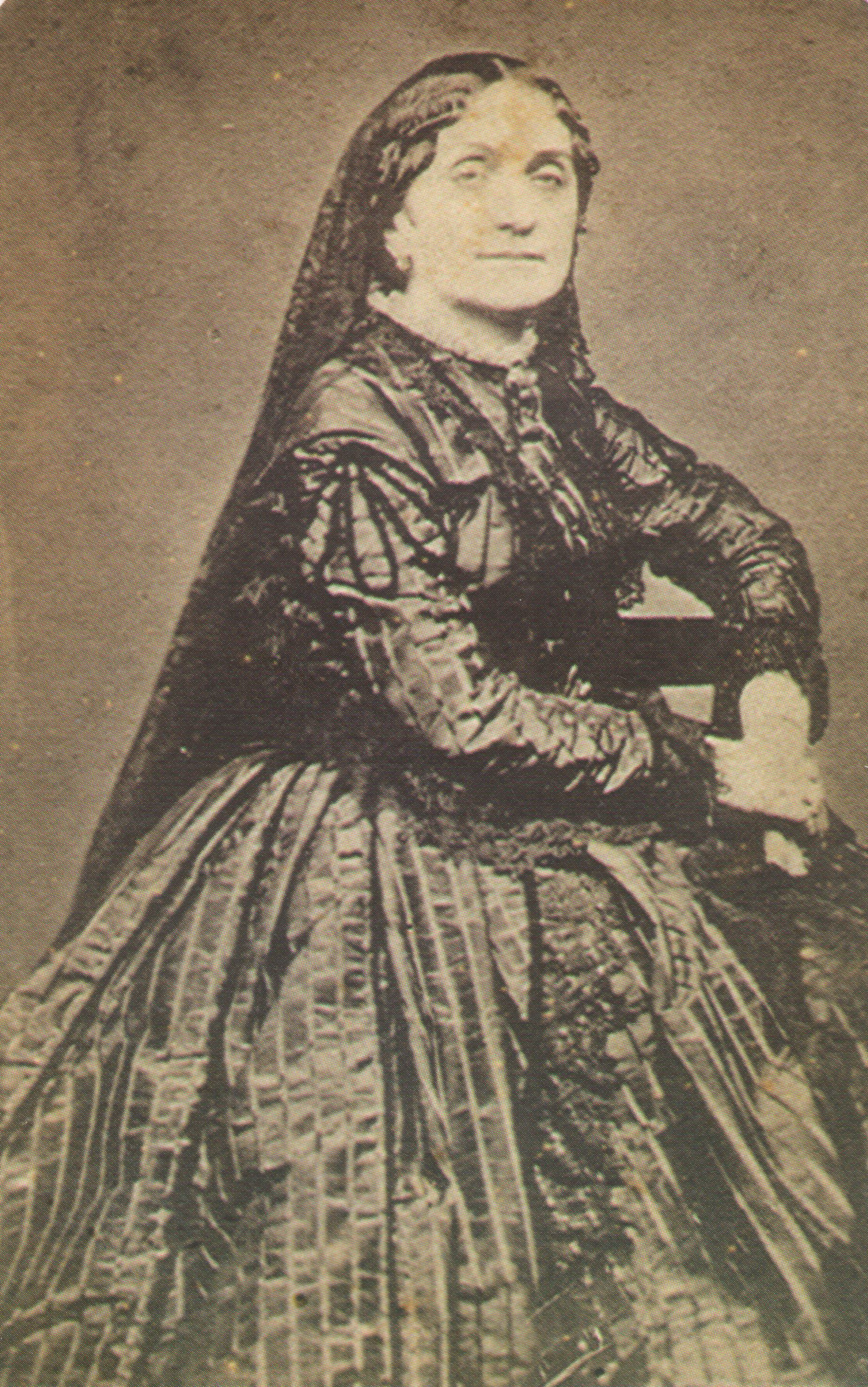
- Born: 1 April 1821; Serbia
- Died: 10 June 1868 (aged 47); Belgrade, Serbia
- Spouse: Alexander Konstantinović
- Issue: Alexander Konstantinović; Katarina Konstantinović; Simeona Lakhovari (illegitimate)
- House: House of Obrenović
- Father: Jevrem Obrenović
- Mother: Thomanija Bogičević
- Religion: Serbian Orthodox
- Occupation: writer, society leader

Princess Anka Obrenović (later Anka Konstantinović, Serbian Cyrillic: Анка Обреновић; 1 April 1821 – 10 June 1868 [29 May o.s.]) was a member of the Serbian royal Obrenović dynasty as the niece of the dynasty's founder Miloš Obrenović I, Prince of Serbia. She was also a society leader and writer whose translations in 1836 were the first literary works compiled by a woman to be published in Serbia. She was the inspiration for a poem by renowned Croatian poet Antun Mihanović, who had wished to marry her when she was 16 and he 41. In 1860, she established one of the first Serbian salons in her home in Belgrade. She was also known as "Anka pomodarka" ("Anka the fashionable").

She was assassinated alongside her first cousin Prince Michael III of Serbia, who was the ruling prince of Serbia at the time.

== Family ==
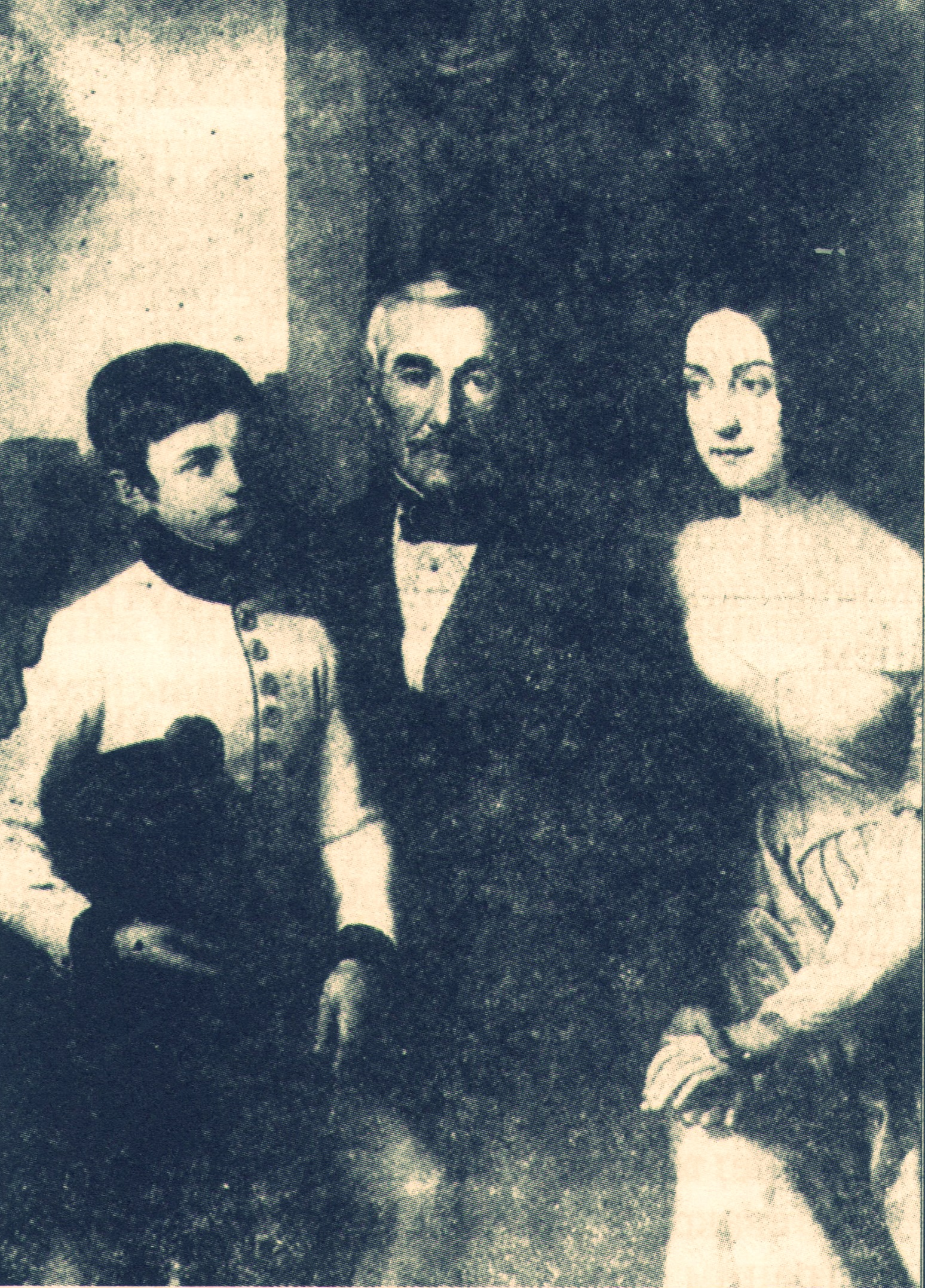
Princess Anka with her father Prince Jevrem and her brother Prince Miloš

Princess Anka was born on 1 April 1821, the third daughter of Prince Jevrem Obrenović and Tomanija Bogićević, daughter of Vojvoda Antonije Bogićević. Her father, who also served as Governor of Belgrade and Regent of Serbia (1839), was a younger brother of Serbian Prince Miloš Obrenović I. Her paternal grandparents were Teodor Mihailovic, who had been an impoverished land-owner originally from Montenegro, and Višnja Gojković. She had four sisters, Jelena, Simeona, Jekaterina, and Anastasia; and one brother, Miloš, whose son would later reign as Prince Milan IV and King Milan I.

== Early literary achievements ==
She was described as having been "very beautiful, very intelligent, and well-educated". She was evidently more modern than Prince Miloš's daughters Petrija and Savka, who still wore traditional Turkish garb. In fact, an extant painting of Anka shows her seated at her piano wearing a fashionable and elegant gown. She was actually one of the few people in Serbia at that time who owned and played the piano. It was Anka's very modernity that later earned her the sobriquet Anka pomodarka ("Anka the fashionable")

A Frenchman who met Anka commented on her good looks, wit, and considerable accomplishments; her ability to speak French was rare among her contemporaries. Her father, Jevrem was the first man in Belgrade to introduce Western European customs and manners into his home; he also owned an extensive library. His love of literature was shared by Anka, who along with her siblings, received an excellent education from one of the best tutors in Serbia. At the age of 13, Anka published a number of parables which she had painstakingly translated from the original German-a language in which she was also fluent. She went on to have her writings published in a variety of periodicals, including the literary journal Danica ilirska, in which she used her pseudonym, "An Illyrian woman from Serbia". Two years later, in 1836, she published a compilation of her translations which was the first literary work ever published by a woman in Serbia.

Anka, still in her teens, attracted and inspired many poets, some of whom dedicated poems as well as entire volumes of poetry to her, enthusiastically comparing her to the Ancient Greek female poet, Sappho as well as the Milesian Aspasia, whose wit and conversation had drawn the greatest writers and philosophers in Athens. Croatian poet Antun Mihanović, who was the Austrian consul in Belgrade and a frequent visitor to her father's home, fell deeply in love with her and sought her hand in marriage. She was 16 years old at the time and he was 41. While the proposal met with her father's approval, Anka's autocratic uncle Prince Miloš adamantly refused to give his consent to the match, possibly because Mihanović was Roman Catholic, while Anka and the royal family were Serbian Orthodox. In 1839, Mihanović departed from Serbia; it's not known whether he and Anka ever met again. In 1840 he wrote a poem about Anka which he entitled "The Stone Maiden" (Croatian: Kamena djeva) and which was published in 1844 in the Danica ilirska.

== Marriage and issue ==
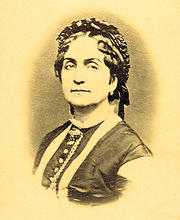
Princess Anka in Serbian national dress

In 1842, she married Alexander Konstantinović, son of Obrad Konstantinović (paternal first cousin of Konstantin Hadija, Prince Jevrem Obrenović's son-in-law) and Danica Gvozdenović, by whom she had two children:

- Colonel Alexander Konstantinović (died 1914), married Milena Opuić, by whom he had one daughter, Natalija (wife of Prince Mirko of Montenegro), and one son, Vladimir.
- Katarina Konstantinovic (1848–1910), married firstly in 1868 General Milivoje Blaznavac (16 May 1824 – 5 April 1873), by whom she had issue; she married secondly, Mihajlo Bogićević (1843–1899).

In 1860, she established one of the first Serbian salons at her home. Anka's "art gathering" as it was called, "greatly influenced the spiritual rebirth of Serbian society in the 1860s". Anka invited the most prominent artistic and intellectual women in Belgrade, as well as the wives of foreign diplomats to her celebrated salon, which featured musical performances along with readings of Serbian, French, German, and Italian poetry. Discussions about politics and current affairs also took place at the meetings.

Sometime after her husband's death, Princess Anka and her daughter, Katarina were invited by her cousin Prince Mihailo to live at the royal court. On an unknown date, Anka gave birth to an illegitimate daughter by her former brother-in-law, Jovan Ghermani, who was the husband of her late sister, Simeona, who had died in 1837 at the age of 19. Anka bestowed her dead sister's name on her daughter. The child, Simeona (died 1915) would later go on to marry an important Romanian minister, Alexander Lahovary (1841–1897), member of the aristocratic Lahovary family, by whom she had issue; and she would serve Queen consort Elisabeth of Romania as one of her ladies-in-waiting.

== Assassination ==
Since the death of Prince Miloš in September 1860, his only surviving son and Anka's first cousin, Prince Mihailo had ruled Serbia for the second time after being deposed in 1842 in favour of Alexander Karadordević. He was described as having been an educated and cultured man, as well as the most enlightened of Serbian rulers. Anka's daughter Katarina was his mistress who nurtured hopes of one day becoming his wife as Mihailo's marriage to Countess Julia Hunyady de Kéthely was childless, and he had begun to consider a divorce, with the aim of making Katarina his consort. On 10 June 1868 Anka, Katarina, and Prince Mihailo were taking a stroll through the park of Košutnjak, near Mihailo's country residence on the outskirts of Belgrade, when they were shot by assassins believed to be in the pay of the Obrenović's rival dynasty, the Karađorđevićs. Mihailo was killed, and Katarina wounded; Anka allegedly fought bravely with her attackers before she was also shot dead.

The Serbian newspapers announced her death with the obituary: "With his Royal Highness, his cousin Mrs. (Note: Note: This is possibly mistranslated by the author from the original Serbian gospođa which could also mean Lady) Anka Konstantinovic was also killed".

== Legacy ==
In 1902, Princess Anka's granddaughter, Natalija Konstantinović married Prince Mirko of Montenegro. The king who sat on the Serbian throne was Anka's great-nephew Alexander I who was married to the much older and unpopular, Draga Mašin. As Princess Natalija was Anka's granddaughter, thus a descendant of the Obrenović dynasty, the Serbian government promised that should Alexander die childless, which seemed likely after Queen Draga's false pregnancies and encroaching age, the crown of Serbia would pass to Prince Mirko. Events, however did not proceed according to the hopes of Prince Mirko and Princess Natalija. Following the brutal assassination of King Alexander and Queen Draga by a group of Army officers led by Captain Dragutin Dimitrijević Apis on the night of 10/11 June 1903 (by the New Style calendar), the crown instead passed to Peter Karađorđević, who was viewed as pro-Russian, while the rival Obrenovićs were known allies of the detested Habsburgs. Peter was the preferred candidate for the throne in the tide of Pan-Slavic nationalism that had engulfed Serbia since the mid-19th century.

Princess Anka's descendants are the only known surviving line of the Obrenović dynasty, which became extinct in the male line upon the regicide of King Alexander. Nicholas, Crown Prince of Montenegro, modern pretender to the defunct Montenegrin throne is her descendant.

== See also ==
- Obrenović family tree
- Ana Marija Marović
- Eustahija Arsić
- Milica Stojadinović-Srpkinja
- Staka Skenderova
- Draga Dejanović
