= Bogićević =

Bogićević (Serbian Cyrillic: Богићевић) and Bogičević (Богичевић) are two related Serbian surnames, patronymics derived from Bogić, a diminutive of Bogoje. It may refer to:

- Bogić Bogićević, Bosnian politician
- Dušan Bogičević (born 1990), Serbian rower
- Jadranko Bogičević (born 1983), Bosnian footballer
- Nina Bogićević (born 1989), Serbian women's basketballer
- Tijana Bogićević (born 1981), Serbian singer
- Vladislav Bogićević (born 1950), Serbian footballer
