= Brusnica, Gornji Milanovac =

Brusnica Брусница
- Village
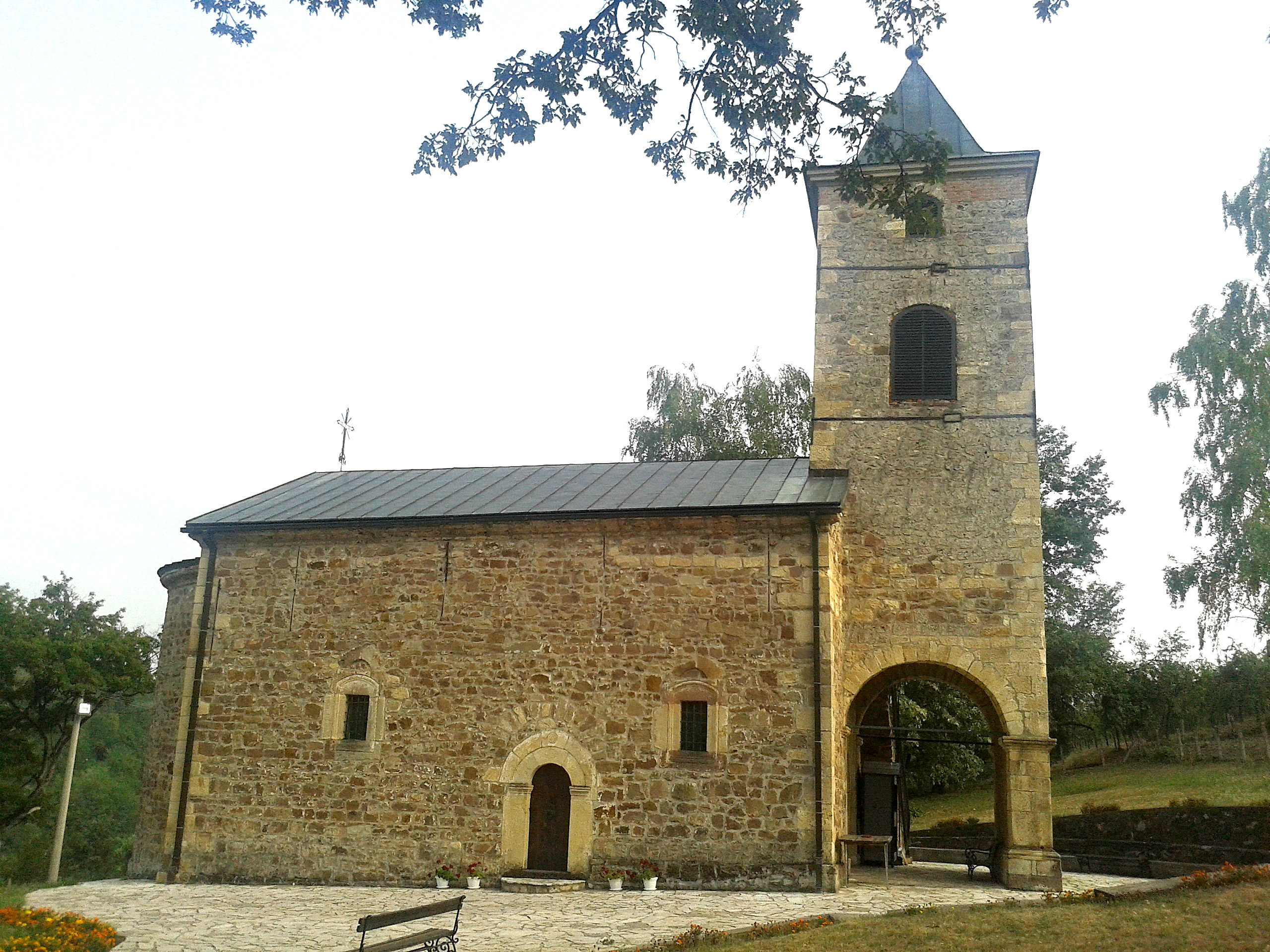
- Brusnica.jpg

- Location within Serbia
- Coordinates: 44°01′N 20°26′E
- Country: Serbia
- District: Moravica District
- Municipality: Gornji Milanovac

Population (2002)
  - Total: 650
- Time zone: UTC+1 (CET)
  - Summer (DST): UTC+2 (CEST)

Brusnica (Serbian Cyrillic: Брусница) is a village in the municipality of Gornji Milanovac, Serbia. According to the 2002 census, the village has a population of 650 people.

The village was active in the Serbian Revolution, being organized into the knežina (administrative unit) of Brusnica (Takovo) during the First Serbian Uprising (1804–13). Among notable local revolutionaries were the Obrenović family (Milan, Jovan, Miloš), buljubaša Milovan Stanojčić, Jovan Ponjavić, Vujadin Oputa, Rale Mijailov Oputić, and merchant Miloje.
