= Srednja Dobrinja =

Srednja Dobrinja Средња Добриња
- Village
- Location within Serbia
- Coordinates: 43°56′32″N 20°03′40″E
- Country: Serbia
- District: Zlatibor District
- Municipality: Požega

Area
  - Total: 8.2 km^{2} (3.2 sq mi)

Population (2022)
  - Total: 322
  - Density: 39/km^{2} (100/sq mi)
- Time zone: UTC+1 (CET)
  - Summer (DST): UTC+2 (CEST)

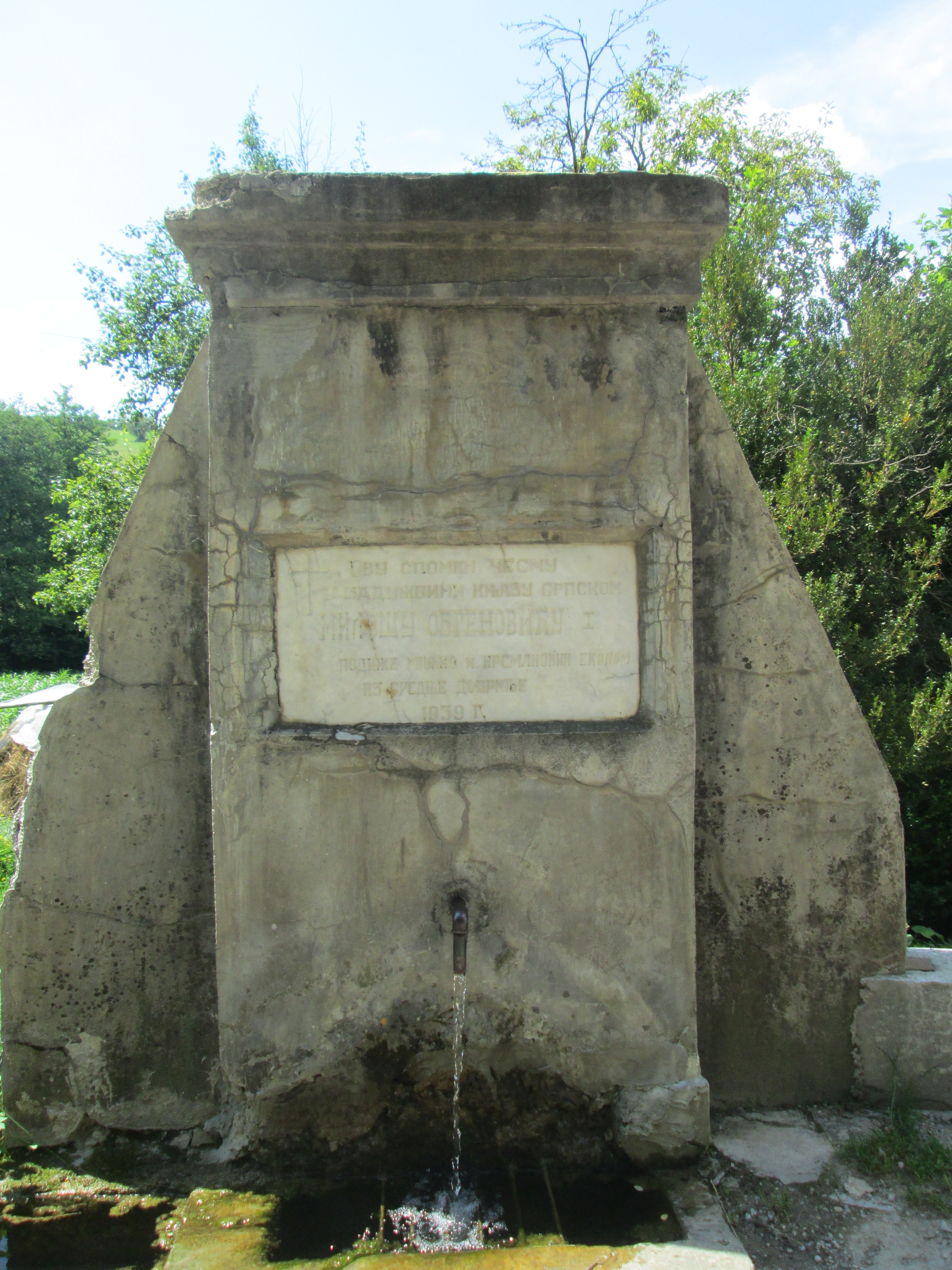
Memorial fountain built by Miljko Krsmanović for prince Miloš Obrenović (1939), Srednja Dobrinja

Srednja Dobrinja is a village in the municipality of Požega, western Serbia. According to the 2022 census, the village has a population of 322 people.
