= Gornja Dobrinja =

Gornja Dobrinja Горња Добриња
- Village
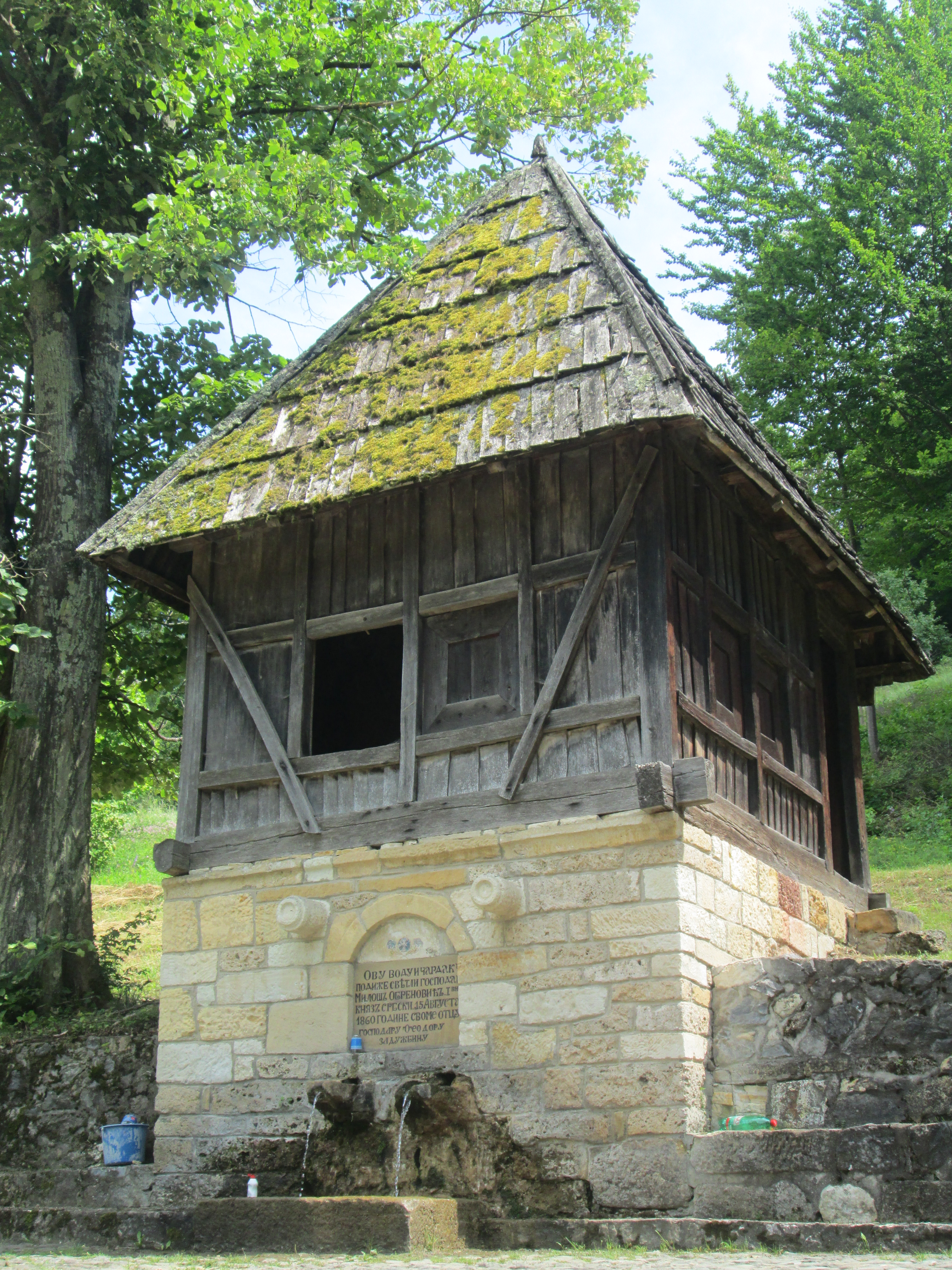

- Location within Serbia
- Coordinates: 43°57′42″N 20°04′41″E
- Country: Serbia
- District: Zlatibor District
- Municipality: Požega

Area
  - Total: 13.3 km^{2} (5.1 sq mi)

Population (2022)
  - Total: 312
  - Density: 23.5/km^{2} (60.8/sq mi)
- Time zone: UTC+1 (CET)
  - Summer (DST): UTC+2 (CEST)
- Postal code: 31214

Gornja Dobrinja (Serbian Cyrillic: Горња Добриња) is a village in the municipality of Požega, western Serbia. According to the 2022 census, the village has a population of 312 people. Prince of Serbia Miloš Obrenović was born in the village.
