= Order of Glory (Ottoman Empire) =

Order of Glory نشانِ افتخار
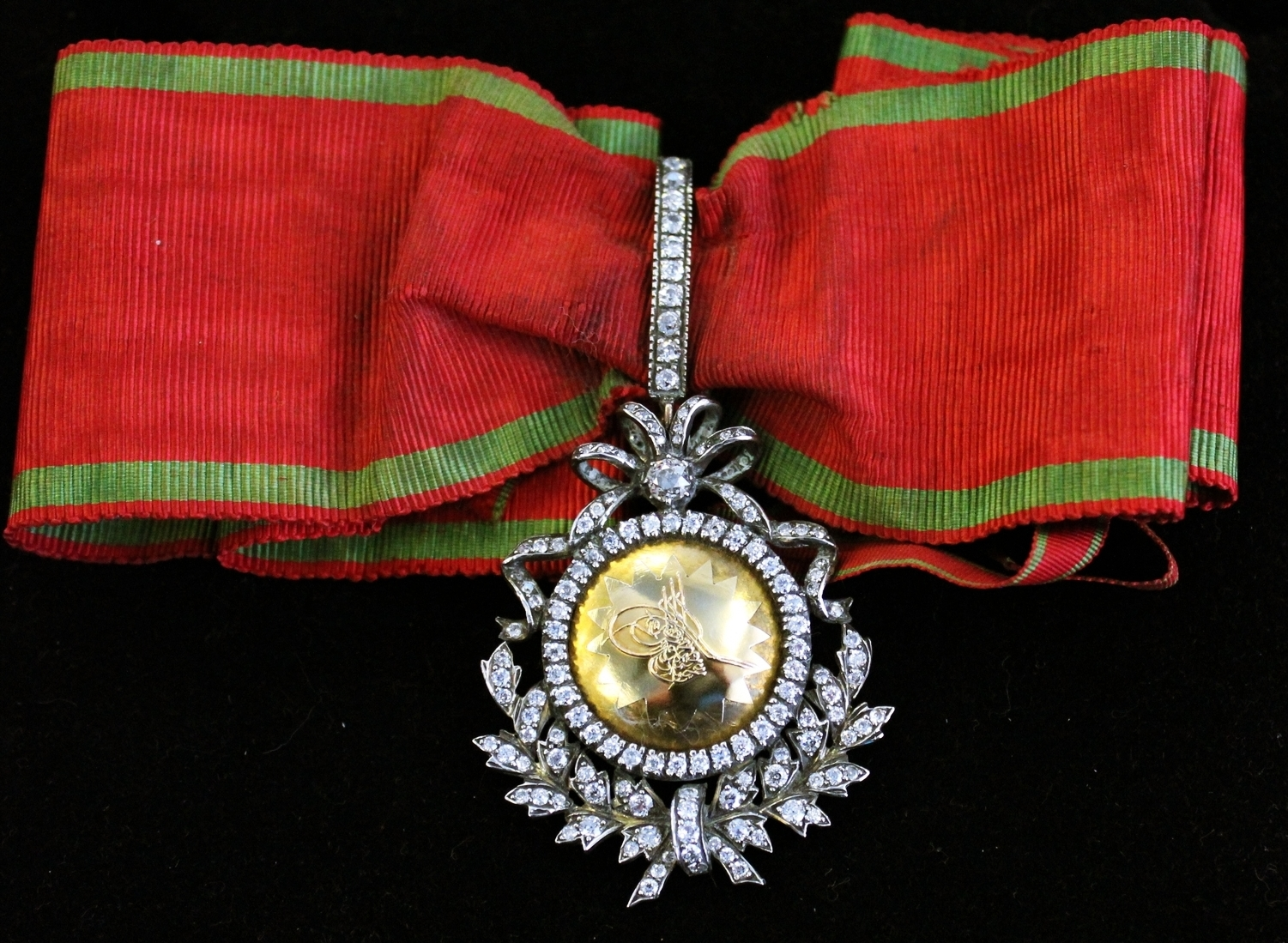
- Order of Glory of the Ottoman Empire
- Type: Order of Merit
- Awarded for: General merit
- Country: Ottoman Empire
- Presented by: Ottoman Sultan
- Status: Extinct
- Established: 19 August 1831
- Final award: 1862 (with exceptions)
- Ribbon bar of the order

Precedence
- Next (higher): Order of Distinction
- Next (lower): Order of Osmanieh

The Order of Glory (Ottoman Turkish: نشانِ افتخار, Nişân-ı iftihâr) was the second highest-ranking chivalric order of the Ottoman Empire, and was founded on 19 August 1831 by Sultan Mahmud II.

The Order of Glory was not made obsolete by the institution of the Order of the Medjidie in 1851, but continued to be awarded during the reign of Abdul Hamid II.

A chapter of the Ottoman Order of Glory was instituted in Tunisia in 1835 as the Order of Glory (Tunisia) by Mustafa ibn Mahmud, the Bey of Tunis.

== Recipients ==
- Grand Cordons
  - Paul von Hindenburg
  - Andrew Cunningham, 1st Viscount Cunningham of Hyndhope
  - Charles-Marie-Esprit Espinasse
  - Prince Georg of Bavaria
  - Shah Jahan Begum
  - Marie-Pierre Kœnig
  - Jagatjit Singh
  - Walter Bedell Smith
  - Jan Syrový
  - Arthur Tedder, 1st Baron Tedder
- Grand Officers
  - Pierre Clostermann
  - Henri Romans-Petit
  - Washington Carroll Tevis
- Commanders
  - Bib Dod Pasha
  - Pierre Billotte
  - Prince Leopold of Bavaria
  - Samuel Morse
  - Kazimierz Porębski
  - Bernard Saint-Hillier
- Knights
  - Prince Adalbert of Prussia
  - Alois Lexa von Aehrenthal
  - Constantin Cantacuzino
  - Prince Eitel Friedrich of Prussia
  - Wilhelm II, German Emperor
  - Colonel Thomas Moody, Kt.
- Unknown Class
  - Lazar Arsenijević Batalaka
  - Willy Coppens
  - Isma'il Pasha
  - Ilija Garašanin
  - Petar Jokić
  - Alexander Karađorđević
  - Stevan Knićanin
  - Matija Nenadović
  - Jovan Obrenović
  - Mihailo Obrenović
  - Dimitrie Ralet
  - Frits Thaulow
