= Miloš Obrenović =

19th-century Serbian revolutionary and dynasty founder

Miloš Obrenović I
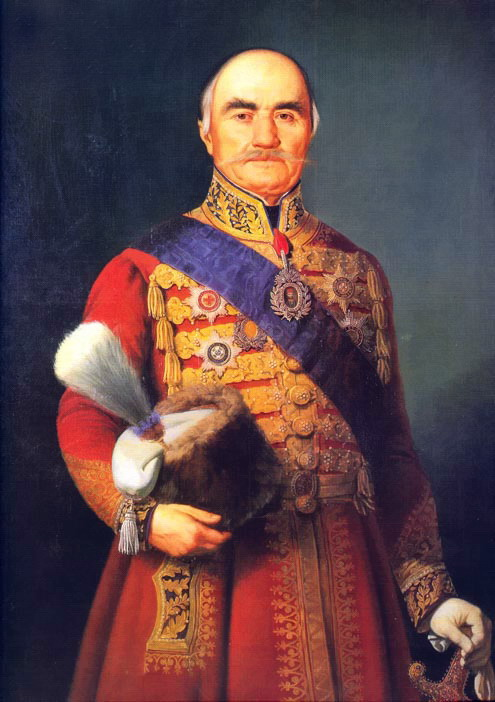
- Miloš Obrenović I, 1847

Prince of Serbia
- Reign: 23 December 1858 – 26 September 1860
- Predecessor: Alexander Karađorđević
- Successor: Mihailo III (Obrenović)
- Reign: 6 November 1817 – 25 June 1839
- Predecessor: Himself (as Grand Vožd of Serbia)
- Successor: Milan II

Grand Vožd of Serbia
- Reign: 23 April 1815 – 6 November 1817
- Predecessor: Karađorđe
- Successor: Himself (as Prince of Serbia)
- Born: 18 March 1780; Gornja Dobrinja near Požega, Ottoman Empire
- Died: 26 September 1860 (aged 80); Belgrade, Principality of Serbia
- Burial: Cathedral of Saint Archangel Michael, Belgrade, Serbia
- Consort: Ljubica Vukomanović (m. 1805; died 1843)
- Issue: Princess Petria; Princess Elisabeth; Prince Milan II; Prince Mihailo III; Princess Maria; Prince Todor; Prince Gabriel
- Serbian: Милош Обреновић I
- House: Obrenović
- Father: Teodor Mihailović
- Mother: Višnja Urošević
- Religion: Serbian Orthodox

Military service
- Branch/service: Serbian Revolutionary Army
- Battles/wars: First Serbian Uprising (1804–1813); Second Serbian Uprising (1815–1817); Battle of Ljubić; Battle of Karanovac; Battle of Požarevac; Battle of Dublje

Miloš Obrenović I (Serbian: Милош Обреновић I; pronounced [mîloʃ obrěːnoʋit͡ɕ]; 18 March 1780 – 26 September 1860), born Miloš Teodorović (Serbian: Милош Теодоровић; pronounced [mîloʃ teodǒːroʋit͡ɕ]), also known as Miloš the Great (Serbian: Милош Велики, romanized: Miloš Veliki), was the Prince of Serbia twice, from 1815 to 1839, and from 1858 to 1860. He was an eminent figure of the First Serbian uprising, the leader of the Second Serbian uprising, and the founder of the house of Obrenović.

Under his rule, Serbia became an autonomous principality within the Ottoman Empire. Prince Miloš was an autocrat, consistently refusing to decentralize power, which gave rise to a strong internal opposition. Despite his humble background, he eventually became the most affluent man in Serbia and one of the wealthiest in the Balkans, possessing estates in Vienna, Serbia and Wallachia. During his rule, Miloš bought a certain number of estates and ships from the Ottomans and was also a prominent trader.

== Early life ==
Miloš Teodorović was the son of Teodor "Teša" Mihailović (died 1802) from Dobrinja, and Višnja (died 18 June 1817). His family descended from the Bratonožići tribe. This was the second marriage of his mother Višnja, from which also sprung Jovan (1787–1850) and Jevrem (1790–1856). From Višnja's first marriage, with Obren Martinović (died 1780) from Brusnica, Miloš had half-brothers Jakov (died 1811) and Milan (died 1810), and half-sister Stana. After the death of Obren, Višnja moved from Brusnica and married Teodor in Dobrinja.

Although many historians put 1780 as the year when Miloš was born, according to foundation plaque in the wall of the Old Church in Kragujevac, his capital, he was 35 when the church was finished in 1818, implying a birth in 1782/3. After the death of his half-brother Milan, a famed revolutionary with great reputation among the people, Miloš adopted the surname Obrenović. In official documents, his name was sometimes written Miloš Teodorović Obrenović (Serbian Cyrillic: Милош Теодоровић Обреновић; pronounced [mîloʃ teodǒːroʋit͡ɕ obrěːnoʋit͡ɕ]).

== First Serbian Uprising ==
Miloš fought in the First Serbian uprising until its very end in 1813. He was wounded in the battle for Užice. His half-brother Milan also took part in the uprising, rising to become the voivode of the Rudnik district, until his death in 1810. After Milan's death, Miloš adopted the surname of his half-brother, Obrenović. This name was the patronymic which his half-brother derived from Obren, the first name of his own father (Miloš's step-father). After the rebellion collapsed, Miloš was among the few of its leaders that remained in Serbia to face the returning Ottomans.

== Interlude ==
After the suppression of the First Serbian Uprising, Grand Vizier Hurshid Pasha sent his commander Serčesma to the still rebellious parts of Serbia with a large army to return the Serbs under Ottoman suzerainty and ensure them of their rights. Serčesma went to the Rudnik and Čačak nahiyas where he knew vojvoda Miloš Obrenović held out and had him surrender his weapons at the Takovo church, with Serčesma returning all but his sabre (to give to Hurshid as a token), as a sign of trust in him and his rule over his people in the area, and other commanders followed suit.

Serčesma appointed Latif Agha from Slišane the mutesellim (mayor) of Čačak, and Ašin-beg the mutesellim of Brusnica. Miloš befriended Ašin-beg. After completing his tasks, Serčesma took Miloš with him to Belgrade before Hurshid Pasha, who recognized him as governor of the Rudnik nahiya. Shortly after this, Hurshid left the Belgrade Pashalik and appointed his kethüda Darendeli Ali Pasha as Vizier. Darendeli promoted Miloš to governor of the Kragujevac and Požega nahiyas, as well. Darendeli was soon replaced with Sulejman Pasha Skopljak, who didn't follow Hurshid's and Darendeli's acceptable holding towards Serbs, but instead disarmed and extorted them and sent the army into Serb areas to be fed, an administration in the likes of the Dahije. The Ottoman army brought plague into Serbia, and this, together with instances of murder, resulted in a rebellion led by Hadži-Prodan.

== Second Serbian Uprising ==
Takovo, proclamation of Uprising.

In April 1815, Prince Miloš organized and led the Second Serbian uprising. After defeating the Turks, and Napoleon's defeat in Russia, the Turks agreed to the terms of the agreement from 1815. After the killing of Karađorđe Petrović, in 1817, Obrenović became the leader of the Serbs. As a result of the agreement, Serbia gained some autonomy, but remained under Ottoman sovereignty. Miloš Obrenović was left in power as its absolute ruler.

Between the end of 1828 and the autumn of 1830, Prince Miloš created a so-called "legislative commission" to translate the Code Napoléon into Serbian and codify the laws and customs of the country. After discussing the commission, Miloš invited two distinguished legal specialists to come from Hungary to prepare a more suitable criminal and civil code of laws for Serbia. They were Vasilije Lazarević, Bürgermeister (mayor) of Zemun, and Jovan Hadžić, lawyer, poet, and member of the municipal senate of Novi Sad.

In January 1831, Prince Miloš informed a great national assembly that he had obtained an imperial edict from the Sultan ending all direct obligations of Serbian peasants to their former Turkish lords, guaranteeing Ottoman recognition of Serbian autonomy in most matters of internal administration, and offering Serbia the prospect of territorial aggrandizement, as well as the express right to institute schools, courts, and a governmental administration of her own. The Sultan's decrees of 1830 and 1833 expanded the same rights to a larger territory, and made Serbia a sovereign principality, with Miloš Obrenović as hereditary prince. A Metropolitanate of Serbia was established in Belgrade as an autonomous unit of the Patriarchate of Constantinople. Russia's status as the guarantor of Serbia's autonomy was also recognized.

== Reign ==
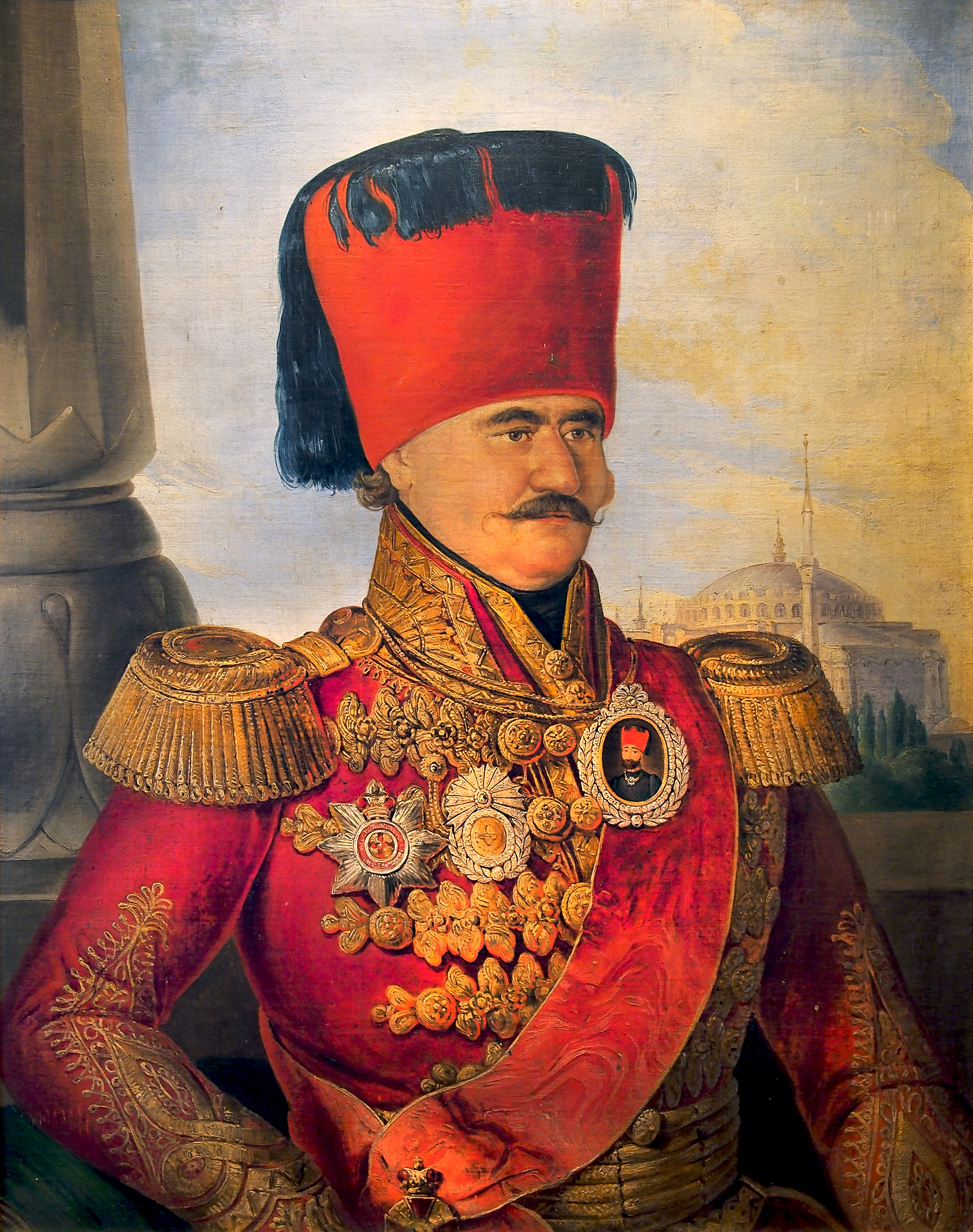
Miloš Obrenović, portrait probably done in Constantinople. Exposition of the Residence of Princess Ljubica (2017)

The supporters of the rule of law often rebelled against Miloš's government. Following one such rebellion, he agreed to adopt a constitution, the Sretenje (or Candlemas) Constitution of 1835. The move was opposed by neighboring Austria, the ruling Ottoman Empire and Russia. It is believed that the three great empires saw the constitution as a danger to their own autocratic systems of government. Metternich's Austria particularly ridiculed the fact that Serbia had its own flag and foreign ministry. Miloš abolished the constitution at the demand of Russia and Turkey, and it was replaced by the "Turkish" Constitution of 1838.

Miloš abdicated in 1839 in favor of his sons—Milan, who died a few weeks later, and Mihailo, who then became prince. Mihailo was deposed in 1842, and the family was out of power until 1858, when it returned with Miloš restored as prince for the last two years of his life.

Thanks to his good contacts during his stay in Vienna, Johann Strauss II composed the Serben-Quadrille intended for Serbian balls.

== Legacy ==
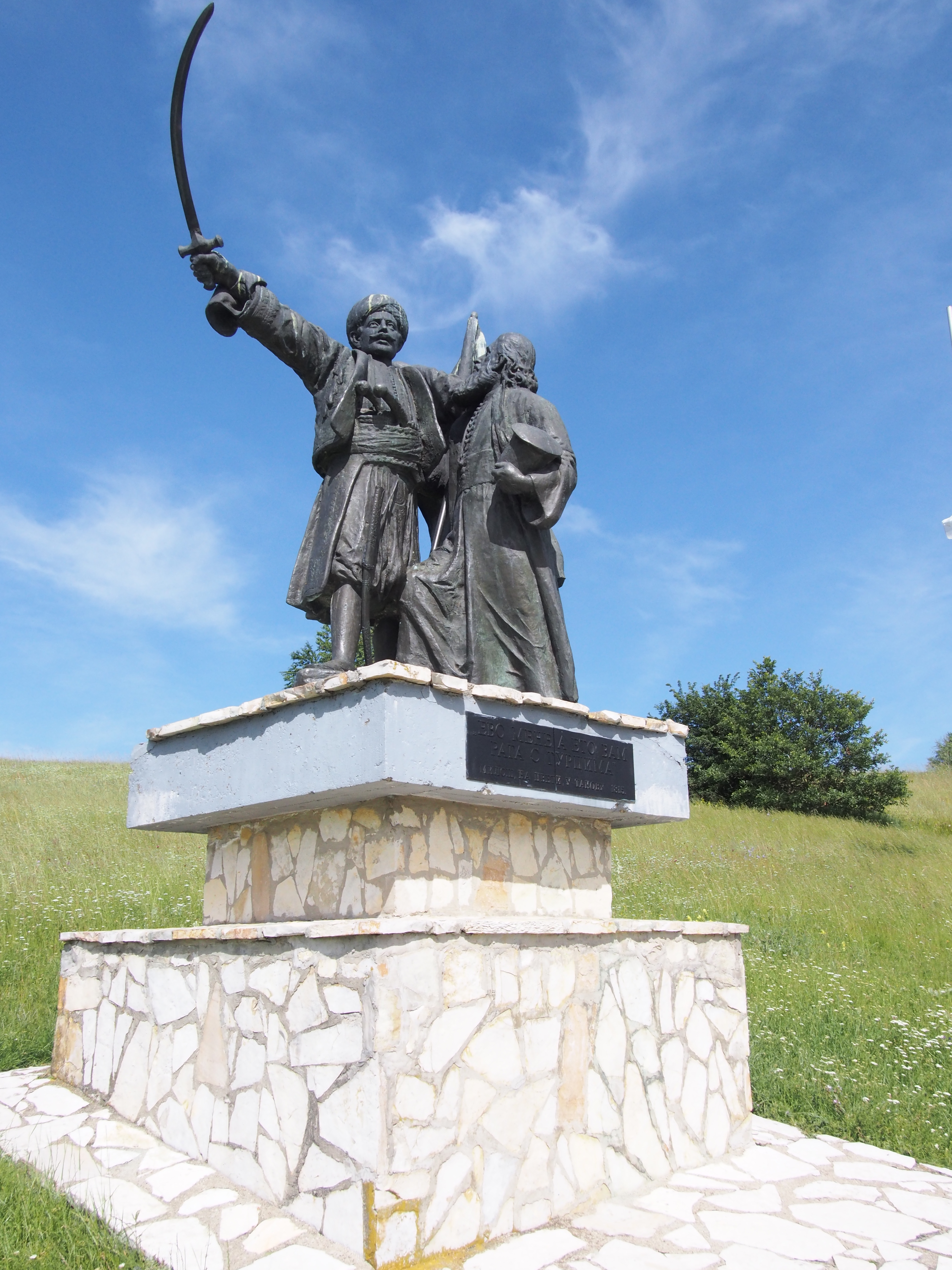
Monument dedicated to Miloš Obrenović and Second Serbian Uprising, Takovo

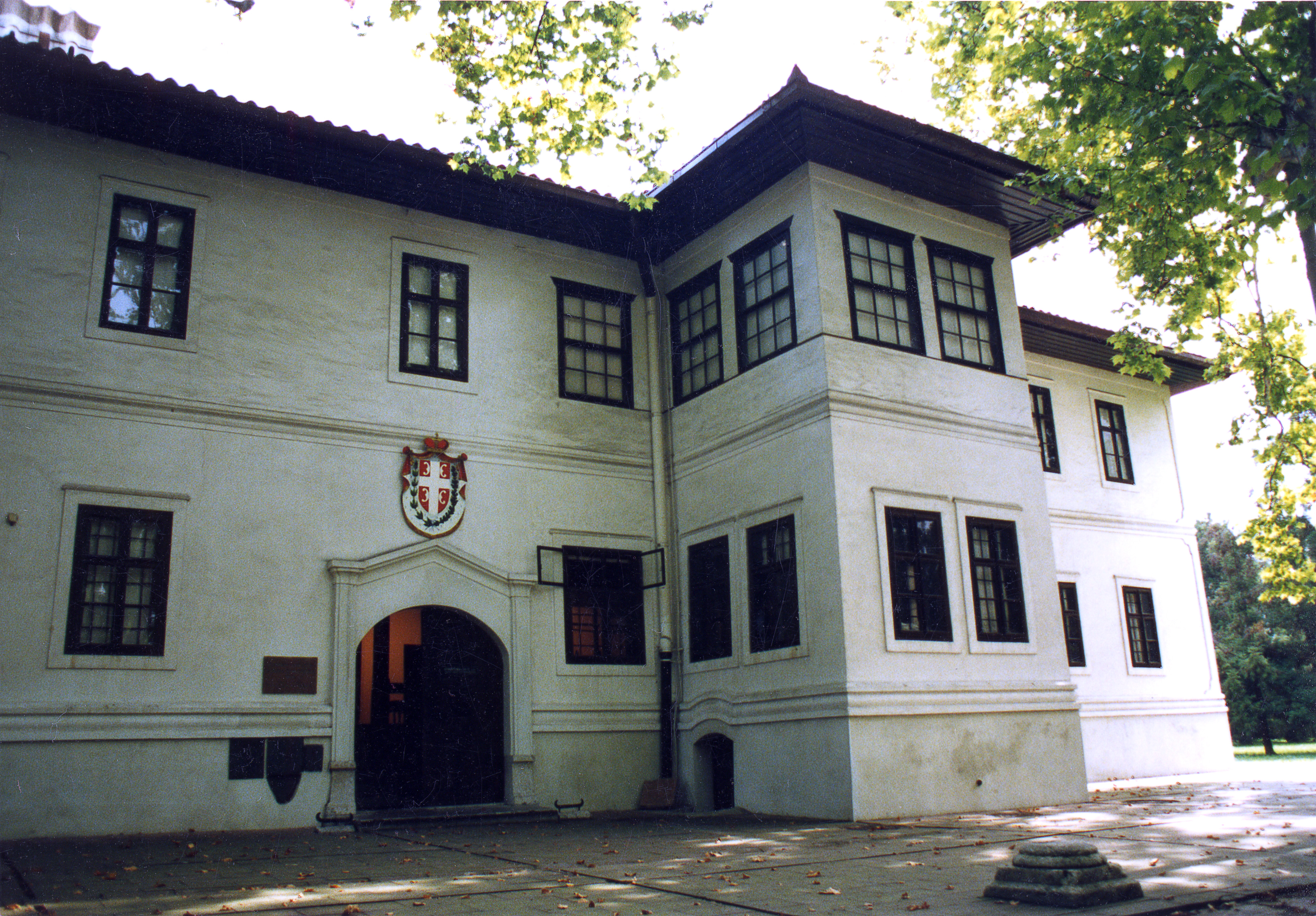
Residence of Prince Miloš, Belgrade

Miloš Obrenović was given the epithet the Great. He was proclaimed Father of the Fatherland by the National Assembly.

=== Things named after Miloš Obrenović ===
==== Biographies and memoirs ====
- Milan Milićević published the book "Prince Miloš and His Story" in 1891. It was written with the basis of a manuscript in which Prince Miloš talked about his life.
- For several years his barber was Nićifor Ninković who left memoirs about it.
- His personal physician during his first reign was Bartolomeo Kunibert, who wrote a two-volume book translated into Serbian entitled "The Serbian Uprising and the First Reign of Milos Obrenovic 1804–1850".
- Part of Knez Miloš' family correspondences has been preserved with his daughter Petrija Bajić near Timișoara. In 1925 the property was bought by Joca Vujić who left the correspondences to the Belgrade University Library "Svetozar Marković", which the book "Family Correspondences of Knez Miloš Obrenović from the Archival Collection of Joca Vujić at the Belgrade University Library "Svetozar Marković"".

==== Enterprises and organizations ====
- Knjaz Miloš a.d. is one of the leading Serbian producers of mineral water.

==== Places ====
- Miloš Obrenović House in Gornja Crnuća, from which Miloš ruled Serbia for two years and in which the decision to start the Second Serbian Uprising was made, was declared a cultural monument of exceptional importance.
- Saint Sava Church in Šarani was founded by him.
- Elementary School "Miloš Obrenović" in Aranđelovac.
- "Knez Miloš Street" in Belgrade is named after him, as well as streets in many other Serbian cities. Along this road, numerous state institutions and embassies are located. The street was called "Miloš the Great" until it was renamed with its present name during communist Yugoslavia.
- "Miloš the Great" Highway, a section of Corridor XI (or A2 motorway; part of the E761 and E763 European routes) from Obrenovac to Preljina, was opened in Serbia on 18 August 2019.

==== Plaques and memorials ====
- Monument to Miloš Obrenović was the work of the sculptor Đorđe Jovanović. The monument was solemnly unveiled by King Aleksandar Obrenović in the presence of state officials and citizens, 24 June 1898.
- The Takovo Uprising monument representing him was set in front of the Government Building in Belgrade.
- The Takovo Uprising monument by Petar Ubavkić in Takovo.

== Awards and honours ==
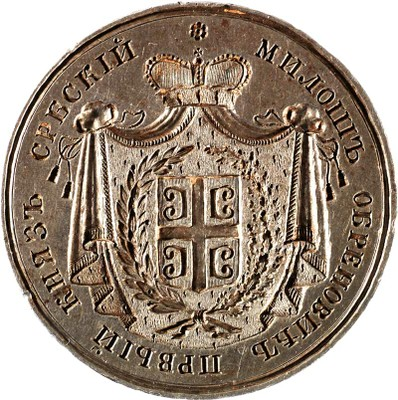
Seal of Miloš Obrenović

- Austria: Order of the Iron Crown, Knight 1st Class
- Greece: Order of the Redeemer, Grand Cross
- Ottoman Empire:
  - Order of Glory
  - Portrait of the Sultan with Jewels (Mahmud II)
  - Portrait of the Sultan with Jewels (Abdülmecid I)
- Russia:
  - Order of St. Anna with Crown, 1st Class
  - Order of St. Anna with brilliants, 2nd Class
  - Order of the White Eagle

== Marriage and children ==
In 1805, Miloš married Ljubica Vukomanović (September 1785 – Vienna, 26 May 1843). The couple had eight children whose names are known. It is speculated that Ljubica had other pregnancies that resulted in miscarriages, stillbirths, or children who died shortly after birth, with some sources giving a number as high as 17 pregnancies.

- Prince Peter
- Princess Petria (5 August 1808 – 1870)
- Princess Elisabeth (28 March 1814 – 5 October 1848)
- Milan Obrenović II, Prince of Serbia (21 October 1819 – 8 July 1839)
- Mihailo Obrenović III, Prince of Serbia (16 September 1823 – 10 June 1868)
- Marija (born and died 9 July 1830)
- Todor (died in childhood)

With mistress Jelenka, he had a son who died in infancy:

- Gavrilo (b. d. 1826)

== See also ==
- List of Serbian Revolutionaries
- Toma Vučić Perišić

== Sources ==
- Ćirković, Sima (2004). The Serbs. Malden: Blackwell Publishing. ISBN 9781405142915.
- Protić, Kosta (1891). "Ратни догађаји из другог српског устанка, год. 1815". Годишњица Николе Чупића. XXXI. Državna štamparija: 1–104 – via Google Books.
- Radosavljević, Nedeljko V. (2010). "The Serbian Revolution and the Creation of the Modern State: The Beginning of Geopolitical Changes in the Balkan Peninsula in the 19th Century". Empires and Peninsulas: Southeastern Europe between Karlowitz and the Peace of Adrianople, 1699–1829. Berlin: LIT Verlag. pp. 171–178. ISBN 9783643106117.
- Rajić, Suzana (2010). "Serbia – the Revival of the Nation-state, 1804–1829: From Turkish Provinces to Autonomous Principality". Empires and Peninsulas: Southeastern Europe between Karlowitz and the Peace of Adrianople, 1699–1829. Berlin: LIT Verlag. pp. 143–148. ISBN 9783643106117.
- Stojančević, Vladimir (1959). "Политички погледи кнеза Милоша Обреновића". Историјски часопис. 9–10. Научно дело: 345–362.
- Cunibert, Barthélemy Sylvestre. Srpski ustanak i prva vladavina Miloša Obrenovića: 1804–1850. Vol. 96. Štamparija D. Dimitrijevića, 1901.
- Krestić, Vasilije, and Nikola Petrović. Protokol kneza Miloša Obrenovića 1824–1825. SANU, 1973.
- Катарина Митровиh "двор кнеза Милоша Обреновиhа" (2008).
- Karadžić, Vuk S. Žizn'i podvigi knjazja Miloša Obrenovića, Verchovnogo Voždja i predvoditelja naroda serbskago. 1825.
- Гавриловић, Михаило. Милош Обреновић. Давидовић, 1908.
- Gavrilović, Mihailo, and Obrenović Miloš. Miloš Obrenović: 1813–1820. Vol. 126. Nova štamparija" Davidović", 1908.
- Miloš Obrenović information (in Serbian)

Miloš Obrenović House of Obrenović Born: 18 March [7 March o.s.] 1780 Died: 26 September 1860
Regnal titles
Preceded by Karađorđe	Grand Vožd of Serbia; 1815–1817	Title abolished proclaimed Prince of Serbia
New title	Prince of Serbia; 1817–1839	Succeeded by Milan Obrenović II
Preceded by Aleksandar Karađorđević	Prince of Serbia; 1858–1860	Succeeded by Mihailo Obrenović III
