= Hadži-Prodan's rebellion =

Serbian rebellion against the Ottoman Empire

- Part of Serbian Revolution
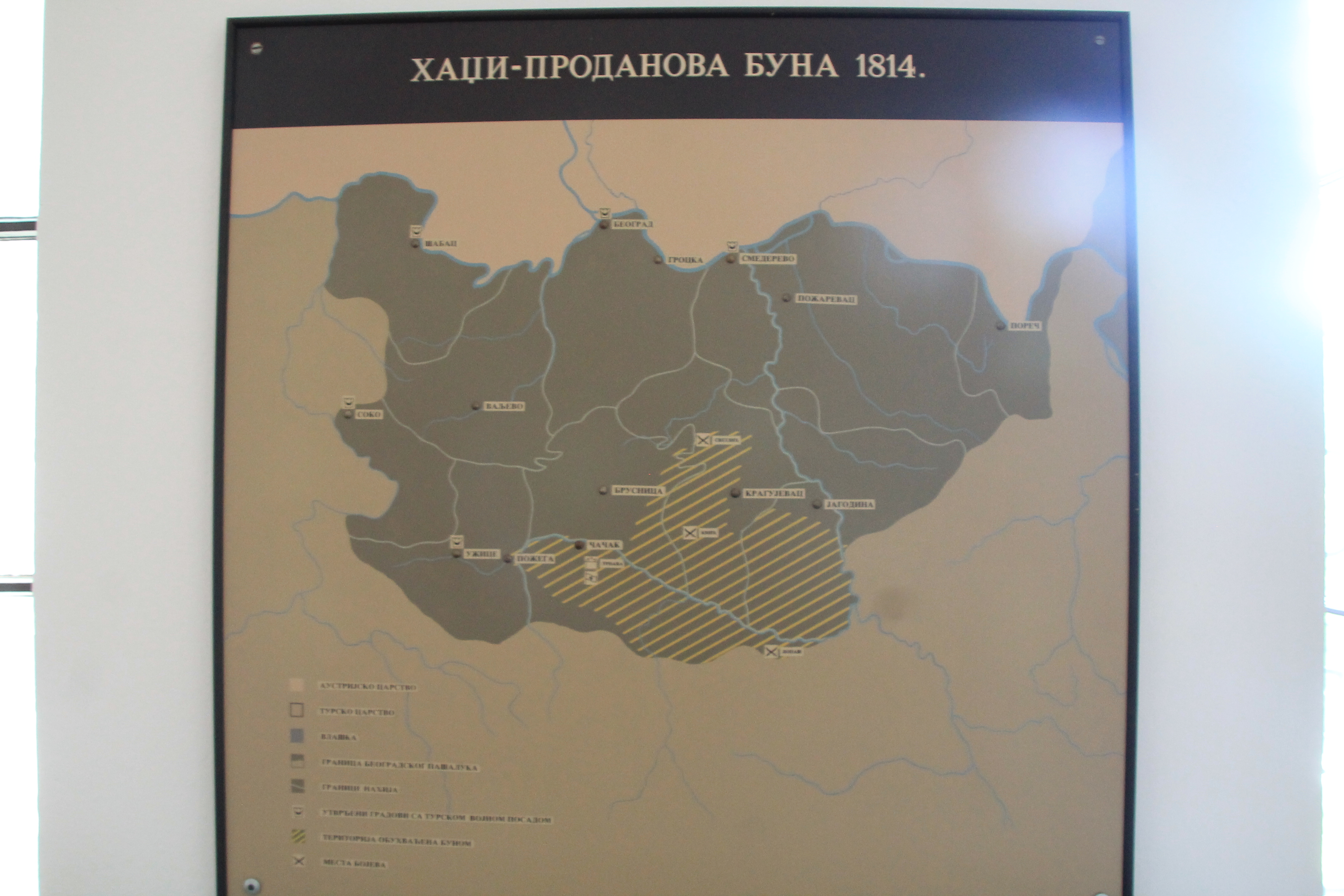
- Map of the area that participated in the rebellion
Date	27 September – 30 December 1814 (3 months and 3 days)
Location	Districts (nahiye) of Požega, Kragujevac and Jagodina in the Sanjak of Smederevo, Ottoman Empire
Result	Ottoman victory: Ottoman reprisal; Outbreak of the Second Serbian Uprising in April 1815

Belligerents
(Revolutionary Serbia) Serbian rebels	Ottoman Empire

Commanders and leaders
Hadži-Prodan; Pajsije Ristić (executed); Nikola Vukićević (executed); Toma Vučić Perišić (surrendered); Petar Tucaković; Stanko Miljčević	Sulejman-paša Skopljak; Latif Agha; Ćor-Zuka; Ćaja-paša; Adem Pasha; Ašin-beg Miloš Obrenović

Strength
1,000	8,000+

Casualties and losses
Hundreds executed during rebellion 300+ prisoners at suppression, many executed slaves taken to Bosnia	Unknown

Hadži-Prodan's rebellion (Serbian: Хаџи-Проданова буна/Hadži-Prodanova buna) was a Serbian rebellion against the Ottoman Empire, which took place from 27 September to 30 December 1814. It occurred between the First (1804–13) and Second (1815) uprisings of the Serbian Revolution. Despite the collapse of the First Uprising in 1813, tensions in the Sanjak of Smederevo ("Belgrade Pashalik") nevertheless persisted. In September 1814 a rebellion was launched by veteran Hadži-Prodan in the Požega nahija. Miloš Obrenović, another veteran, felt the time was not right for an uprising and did not provide assistance, instead aiding in the capture of the rebels. The rebellion soon failed and Hadži-Prodan fled to Austria. After the failure of the revolt, the Ottomans inflicted more persecution against the Serbs, including higher taxation and forced labor. In March 1815, Serbs had several meetings and decided upon a new rebellion, the Second Serbian Uprising.

== Background ==
After the suppression of the First Serbian Uprising, Grand Vizier Hurshid Pasha sent his commander Serčesma to the still rebellious parts of Serbia to return the Serbs under Ottoman suzerainty and ensure them of their rights and that the Sultan had forgiven them. Serčesma went to the Rudnik and Čačak nahiyas where he knew vojvoda Miloš Obrenović held out. Miloš Obrenović surrendered his weapons at the Takovo church to Serčesma, who returned all but his sabre (to give to Hurshid as a token), as a sign of trust in him and his rule over his people in the area, upon which commanders Lazar Mutap, Arsenije Loma, Milić Drinčić and Hadži-Prodan followed suit.

Serčesma appointed Latif Agha from Slišane the mutesellim (mayor) of Čačak, and Ašin-beg the mutesellim of Brusnica. Miloš befriended Ašin-beg. After completing his tasks, Serčesma took Miloš with him to Belgrade before Hurshid Pasha, who recognized him as governor of the Rudnik nahiya. Shortly after this, Hurshid left the Belgrade Pashalik and appointed his kethüda Darendeli Ali Pasha as Vizier. Darendeli Ali Pasha was appointed the Vizier of Bosnia on 13 March 1813. Darendeli promoted Miloš to governor of the Kragujevac and Požega nahiyas, as well. Sulejman Pasha Skopljak, the serasker of the Ottoman Bosnian cavalry, was appointed the Vizier of Belgrade at the end of October 1813, and he didn't follow Hurshid's and Darendeli's acceptable holding towards Serbs, but instead disarmed and extorted them and sent the army into Serb areas to be fed, an administration in the likes of the Dahije. A letter dated 8 August 1814 signed by Miloš Obrenović and other commanders that stayed in the Pashalik following the end of the uprising was sent to Matija Nenadović and Petar Moler demanding the revolutionary exiles to ask Russia for help regarding atrocities in Serbia. The Ottoman army brought plague into Serbia, and this, together with instances of murder, resulted in the eventual rebellion led by Hadži-Prodan.

The Hofkriegsrat was informed by general Siegenthal on 18 September about Ottoman reinforcements in Belgrade and Serb–Turk distrust, and the Belgrade Pasha's intention to imprison Serb knezes in order to weaken them.

== History ==
Two of Latif Agha's men were robbed on Latif's possessions about to be transferred to the Trnava monastery below the Jelica, where Latif sought to stay clear from the plague. Hadži-Prodan's brother Mihajlo and the monk Pajsije had a fight with the two, and took them tied up into the mountains. Borislav Palalić from Atenica informed Hadži-Prodan on what had happened. Upon this Hadži-Prodan went around the Trnava area and gathered men. Radoslav Jelečanin was sent by Latif to Trnava and he asked Hadži-Prodan what had happened, and Hadži-Prodan told him that he was unaware of the robbery and that he had freed and returned the goods to the two. Hearing of this, Latif went to Karanovac (now Kraljevo) and sent letters to Vizier Sulejman Pasha, neighbouring Ottoman leaders and pashas to send troops, as the "Serbs had risen again". Latif feared and contemplated whether to leave for Leskovac, having gathered all Karanovac and Trstenik troops, but he decided to send those troops there and return to Čačak. For two days, hajduks fought with Kara-Fejza from Čačak, until both sides retreated.

The surrounding Serb areas heard of Dragačevo rising up and the flight of Karanovac and Trstenik. The rebellion broke out in the Čačak nahiya and echoed most strongly in the Gruža region of the Kragujevac nahiya and to a smaller extent in the Jagodina nahiya. In Gruža, the leaders Toma Vučić, Petar Tucaković and Stanko Miljčević quickly gathered men and pursued the Karanovac-Trstenik column and raided them at Rataji and Lopaš, taking all their weapons, leaving many dead and wounded, but only having one loss. The column was allowed to proceed to Leskovac. Latif mustered Čačak troops and clashed with Vučić and Tucaković for two days, but was forced to retreat to Čačak. Another organizer in the Kragujevac nahiya was merchant Nikola Vukićević from Svetlić. In the meantime, Miloš had been informed by hegumen Pajsije Ristić on the robbery and was asked to join the rebellion, but he strongly refused. Among the organizers of the rebellion were the Trnava clergy of hegumen Pajsije, hieromonk Genadije, deacon Avakum and priest Radovan Vujović. Miloš feared for atrocities and also believed that the Belgrade Turks and Sulejman were out to get him; he had wounded the latter and fought with him at Ravnje in 1813. He understood the rebellion was disorganized and too early, and that the Ottoman army was powerful and the Serbs were weak, dispersed and unorganized. Miloš told priest Radovan Vujović that it was the wrong time in harsh winter and without necessities and that the rebels should go home, and Vujović forwarded this to Hadži-Prodan at the Ilijak hill. Hearing of the rebels, mutesellim Ašin-beg of Brusnica (Rudnik nahiya) sent for Miloš; in order to save the people, Miloš joined him in suppressing the rebellion.

In 2–3 October the Hofkriegsrat was informed by general Siegenthal about the outbreak of rebellion in the Čačak nahiya led by Hadži-Prodan and the Ottoman dispatch of 2,000 Arnauts (Muslim Albanians) under Ćaja-paša on 29 September, and about the potential that the rebellion spreads over Šumadija to the Danube. On 7 October he informed the Habsburg emperor of 3,000 rebels, the plague in Serbia and decision to not let Serb refugees into Austria. An undated Hofkriegsrat document tells of 500 refugees in Banat and failure of Ćaja-paša's campaign and his retreat, as well as the pause of transportation to Serbia and Bosnia. On 9 October minister Metternich stressed the need for good Austrian–Ottoman relations and allowance for Ottoman troops to enter Austrian territory if needed, and the prohibition of Serbs to do so, and the need to prevent communications between Serbs and refugees and to forbid the latter to return to Serbia.

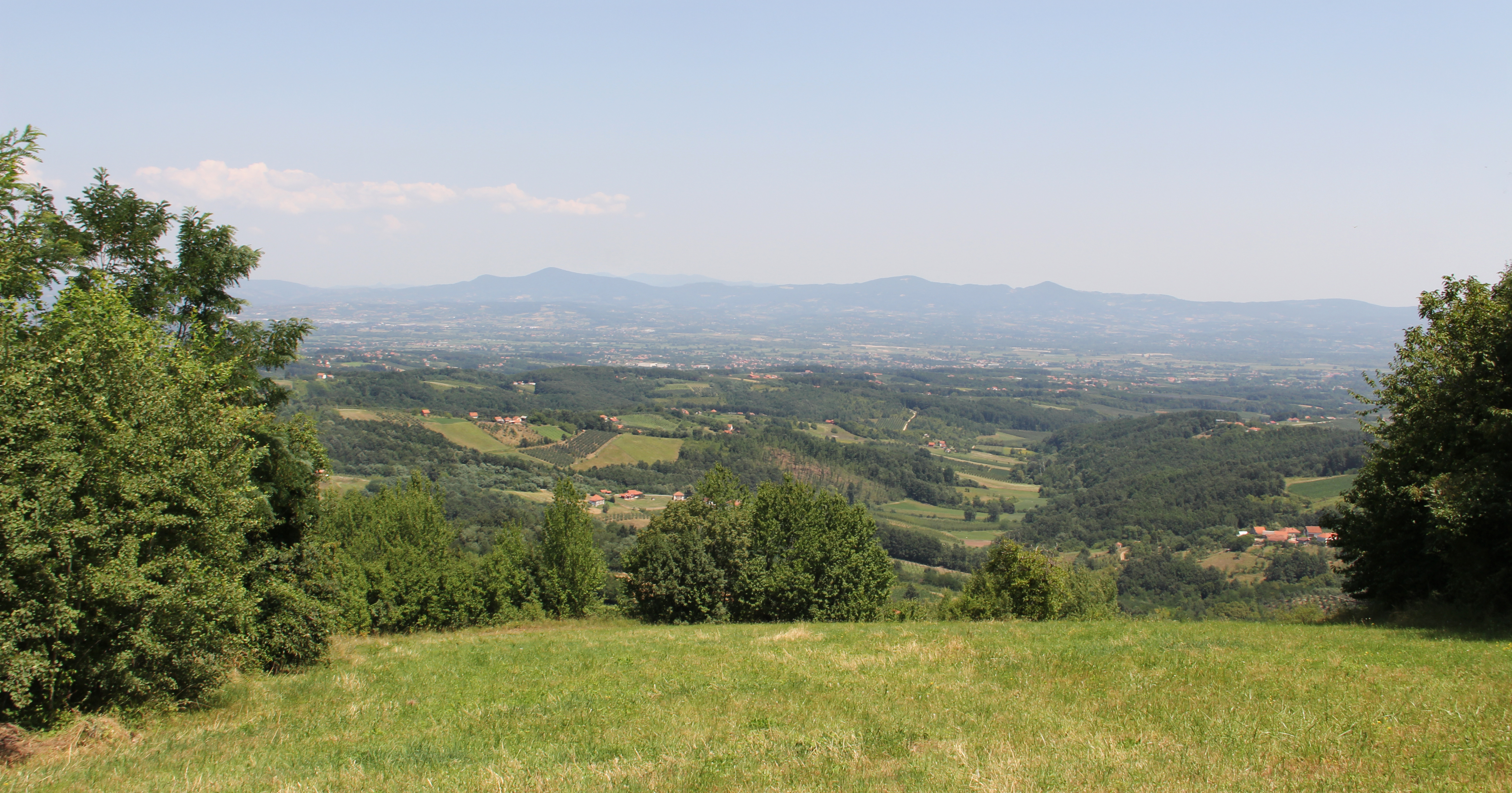
View of the Čačak valley from the Jelica mountain.

Miloš gathered men in his nahiyas and with bölükbaşı (captain) Ćor-Zuka went to Neboš-Gora (a peak of Jelica) to find Hadži-Prodan. Hadži-Prodan lost followers when Miloš appeared, and thus went to Ježevica from where he and Nikola Vukićević rose the Rudnik nahiya and then the Gruža and Lepenica areas, upon which also the Jagodina nahiya joined. At Gruža, Vukićević drafted a proclamation dated 6 October, which said:

Let it be known to all knezovi (village mayors), kmetovi (serfs), bimbaše and buljubaše (commanders) in the Užice, Stari Vlah, Novi Pazar and Požega nahiyas that we, in the name of God and by command of the Russian emperor and master Karađorđe, with all our might, have rose against the Turks, who we have expelled from several nahiyas. Therefore, we recommend to all of you in the above-mentioned nahiyas, that you rise up like us and chase the Turks. I am sending you Petar Dugonja, who has just arrived from the emperor, and Hadži-Prodan and Milić Radonjić, who will appoint as your elders those whom you wish.

— Nikola Vukićević, Proclamation, 6 October 1814

In Dragačevo, Miloš and Ćor-Zuka killed 60 rebels and sent captives to Ašin-beg in Čačak. In the meantime, a large Ottoman army mustered at Čačak, part gathered by Sulejman's deputy Ćaja-paša from Belgrade, and part gathered by Vizier Adem Pasha of Novi Pazar. Ćaja-paša commanded a force of 800 deli cavalry. Ćaja-paša imprisoned many notable Serbs in the Čačak nahiya, including Pajsije, wanting to deter the Serbs from future rebellion. 78 Serbian captives from Požega nahiya were executed in Čačak by Ćaja-paša.

At Knić (in Gruža), the Serbian rebel trench with 200 or 1,000 men was approached by Turk troops numbering 1,000 infantry and 150 cavalry with Miloš calling them to surrender by warning them of bad consequences in further resistance and they surrendered to him "on the face and on the soul" in the same day. At Knić, Toma Vučić Perišić and Sima Paštrmac surrendered to Miloš, while Petar Tucaković refused and went into the hills. Hadži-Prodan and Vukićević refused, and led a victorious skirmish the next day, but seeing that they could not resist, and that Miloš did not want to join them, they disbanded the army. Hadži-Prodan and his young brothers crossed the Sava over to Austrian territory, and Vukićević returned to his village, thereby ending the rebellion. According to the Memoirs of Aleksa Simić, the Gruža leaders took to the Rudnik mountain and were safe thanks to Miloš. From Knić, Miloš and Ašin-beg were sent by Ćaja-paša to Kragujevac where they captured some and deterred the people from rebellion, then went to Jagodina, while Latif was sent to Karanovac to hold the hillfort. Ćaja-paša then arrived at Kragujevac where he killed 50 and put 86 in chains.

Miloš easily managed to stop the people in Kragujevac and Jagodina from joining the rebellion. Ćaja-paša captured Serbs in Čačak, Knić, Kragujevac and Jagodina, and brought all captives, including women and children, to Sulejman in Belgrade as token of victory. Vukićević surrendered to Ćaja-paša and was at first free, but then captured with his younger brother. Adem Pasha left his army with Latif in Čačak and accompanied Ćaja-paša to Belgrade. Miloš saw what was happening and went to Rudnik.

At the end of November 1814, Bosnian Vizier Darendeli Ali Pasha mobilized 40,000, and sent 6,000 into Serbia, to loot and take slaves. Contemporary Ibrahim Mensur Efendi wrote how Bosnian roads were filled with "herds and Serb slaves driven into Bosnia".

== Belgrade executions ==
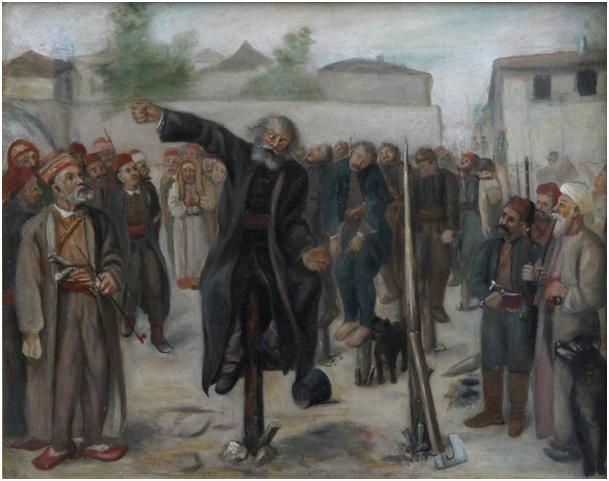
Impalement of Pajsije

Ćaja-paša had a convoy of captives numbering over 300 with him to Belgrade. Some 100 were women; he made many slaves who he dispersed into harems. The hegumen Pajsije was tortured by Sulejman for days and then brought to the Stambol Gate (now Republic Square) where he was impaled alive. Pajsije's brother Dimitrije was also impaled alive next to him the following day, despite not being involved. Some captives were given the choice of converting to Islam or death; Genadije and his son Stojan chose conversion while Avakum refused and was impaled. Most captives were held for three months in the Fortress dungeons and then executed by beheading. The bulk of executions took place on the Serbian feast day of St. Sava, on 29–30 January [O.S. 14–15 January] 1815, according to Sarajlija. People were executed at Kalemegdan, at all entrances to the city. Among notables executed were: Nikola Vukićević and his younger brother, brothers Stevan and Jovan Jakovljević from Belušić, and, falsely accused of participating in the rebellion, subsequently assassinated veteran leaders komandant Milija Zdravković and hajduk Stanoje Glavaš. Some were saved, such as Boško, the first-born of deceased vojvoda Petar Đukić, who was exchanged with his sister by Ćaja-paša, and Milić Radović, who was freed and hid by sipahi Hasan-beg Prajić from Užice.

== Aftermath and legacy ==
The rebellion was quickly suppressed, also with the help of former rebel leader Miloš Obrenović who rightly believed that it was not the right time for revolt. The atrocities that followed the rebellion sparked the Second Serbian Uprising under the leadership of Miloš Obrenović. It succeeded, and among participants, also active in Hadži-Prodan's rebellion, were Gruža leaders Toma Vučić, Sima Paštrmac and Petar Tucaković who were all included in the government of Miloš Obrenović in the Principality of Serbia. Hadži-Prodan did not participate in the second uprising and was in exile in the Russian protectorate of Wallachia, where he joined the Filiki Eteria, and Greek Revolution in 1821.

The National Museum in Čačak has a permanent exhibition of the rebellion. Pajsije and Avakum were proclaimed New-Martyrs of the Serbian Orthodox Church with commemoration on 17 December.

== See also ==
- Timeline of the Serbian Revolution
- Serbian Army (revolutionary)
- List of Serbian Revolutionaries

== Sources ==
- Milićević, Milan Đ. (1888). Поменик знаменитих људи у српског народа новијега доба [Memory Book]. Издање Чупићеве задужбине – via Archive.org.
- Nenadović, Konstantin N. (1884). Живот и дела великог Ђорђа Петровића Кара-Ђорђа [Life and Deeds of Great Đorđe Petrović Kara-Đorđe]. Vol. II (1 ed.). Vienna: У Штампарији Јована Н. Вернаја – via Google Books.
- Nenadović, Konstantin N. (1903) [1883]. Живот и дела великог Ђорђа Петровића Кара-Ђорђа [Life and Deeds of Great Đorđe Petrović Kara-Đorđe]. Vol. I (2 ed.). Belgrade: Штампа Савића и Комп. – via Archive.org.
- Popović, Radomir (2020), Гружа у Хаџи-Продановој буни [Gruža in Hadži-Prodan's rebellion] (PDF), Српски научни центар – центар за етнолошко-антрополошка и мултидисциплинарна истраживања Срба
- Popov, Nil (1870). Србија и Русија од Кочине Крајине до Св. Андрејевске Скунштине. (Време од 1804 па до 1858 г.). Vol. 1. Translated by Srećković, P.; Žujović, Ž.; Vasiljević, A.; Marjanović, A. Државна штампарија – via Google Books.
- Protić, Kosta (1891). "Ратни догађаји из другог српског устанка, год. 1815". Годишњица Николе Чупића. XXXI. Državna štamparija: 1–104 – via Google Books.
- Radosavljević, Nedeljko (2007). Православна црква у Београдском пашалуку 1766-1831. Istorijski institut. ISBN 978-86-7743-065-8.
- Sarajlija, Sima Milutinović (1888). "БУНА". Istorija Srbije od 1813-1815. god [History of Serbia 1813-1815]. Pečatano u štampariji Kraljevine Srbije. pp. 66–.
- Šćekić, Radenko; Leković, Žarko; Premović, Marijan (2015). "Political Developments and Unrests in Stara Raška (Old Rascia) and Old Herzegovina during Ottoman Rule". Balcanica. 46 (46): 79–106. doi:10.2298/BALC1546079S.
- Teinović, Bratislav (2020). "Преглед српско-турског ратовања на Дрини (1804-1815)" (PDF). Војноисторијски гласник. 2. Институт за стратегијска истраживања: 9–35.
