= Nikola Vukićević =

Serbian revolutionary

- Born: mid-18th century Svetlić, Sanjak of Smederevo, Ottoman Empire
- Died: December 1814; Kalemegdan, Ottoman Empire
- Cause of death: execution
- Other names: Vukičić, Sukičić
- Military career
- Allegiance: Revolutionary Serbia
- Service years: 1804–1814
- Unit: Kragujevac nahija army
- Commands: Kragujevac area
- Known for: organizer in Hadži-Prodan's rebellion
- Conflicts: First Serbian Uprising; Hadži-Prodan's rebellion (executed)

Nikola Vukićević (Serbian: Никола Вукићевић; d. December 1814) was a Serb merchant from Svetlić in Šumadija that participated in Hadži-Prodan's rebellion (1814) against the Ottoman Empire in what is today Serbia. Nikola was the main merchant in Svetlić and he rose the Kragujevac nahiya in rebellion.

The Vukićević family (also misspelt Vukičić and Sukičić) lived in Svetlić in the Kragujevac nahiya. Nikola, born in the mid-18th century, became an affluent merchant in the prelude of the First Serbian Uprising. His younger brother was Aleksandar (Александар Вукићевић).

When rebellion broke out in late September 1814 in the Čačak nahiya, Vukićević was among the planners in Šumadija. He himself gathered men and held meetings regarding rebellion. Ćaja-paša deterred the people from revolting in the Jagodina nahiya and took captives with him to Belgrade. Hadži-Prodan went from Jagodina to the Rudnik nahiya and met with Jovan Žujević in Ješevac, who set up a meeting with Nikola Vukićević who raised the Kragujevac nahiya in rebellion according to earlier agreements. Hadži-Prodan lost followers when Miloš and Ćor-Zuka appeared in Dragačevo, and thus went to Ježevica from where he and Nikola Vukićević rose the Rudnik nahiya and then the Gruža and Lepenica areas, upon which also the Jagodina nahiya joined. Although Hadži-Prodan believed that the rebellion wouldn't succeed, Vukićević sought to continue and suggested that the rebellion be moved to the Užice nahiya and Stari Vlah. In a proclamation dated 7 October 1814, signed by Nikola Vukićević, the people of southwestern Serbia were called to rise, on the order of the Russian emperor and Karađorđe. When the rebellion failed with Hadži-Prodan's flight to Austria, Nikola and Aleksandar eventually surrendered to Ćaja-paša at Kragujevac, or at their house, and they were treated fairly for 5–6 days, allowed to carry arms, until put in chains in the dungeon and then taken to Belgrade with the rest of the captives. The brothers were executed in Belgrade. Their date of execution is uncertain, described as "late 1814", beginning of December, or perhaps during the bulk of executions on 29–30 January [O.S. 14–15 January] 1815, according to Sarajlija. The Austrian government got a hold of the 1814 proclamation following the suppression of the rebellion.

== See also ==
- List of Serbian Revolutionaries
- Timeline of the Serbian Revolution
- Serbian Army (revolutionary)

== Sources ==
- Milićević, Milan Đ. (1888). Поменик знаменитих људи у српског народа новијега доба [Memory Book]. Издање Чупићеве задужбине – via Archive.org.
- Nenadović, Konstantin N. (1884). Живот и дела великог Ђорђа Петровића Кара-Ђорђа [Life and Deeds of Great Đorđe Petrović Kara-Đorđe]. Vol. II (1 ed.). Vienna: У Штампарији Јована Н. Вернаја – via Google Books.
- Nenadović, Konstantin N. (1903) [1883]. Живот и дела великог Ђорђа Петровића Кара-Ђорђа [Life and Deeds of Great Đorđe Petrović Kara-Đorđe]. Vol. I (2 ed.). Belgrade: Штампа Савића и Комп. – via Archive.org.
- Popović, Radomir J., ed. (2013). "ВУКИЋЕВИЋ, Никола". II тома Српске енциклопедије.
- Protić, Kosta (1891). "Ратни догађаји из другог српског устанка, год. 1815". Годишњица Николе Чупића. XXXI. Državna štamparija: 1–104 – via Google Books.
- Sarajlija, Sima Milutinović (1888). Istorija Srbije od 1813-1815. god [History of Serbia 1813-1815]. Pečatano u štampariji Kraljevine Srbije. pp. 337–.
