= Serčesma =

Ottoman commander

Harap Ali Agha
- Born: Ali; 17XX; Kahramanmaraş, Ottoman Empire (now Turkey)
- Died: 18XX
- Military career
- Allegiance: Ottoman Empire
- Rank: delibaşı, kethüda
- Nicknames: Harap, Serčesma

Harap Ali Agha (fl. 1813–15), known as Serčesma, was an Ottoman cavalry commander and bodyguard (delibaşı) and kethüda (deputy) of Grand Vizier Hurshid Pasha. He was active in the Sanjak of Smederevo (known as the "Belgrade Pashalik") in the period of the end of the First Serbian Uprising (1804–13), Hadži-Prodan's rebellion (1814) and Second Serbian Uprising (1815), fighting the Serbian rebels.

== Life ==
According to contemporary Sarajlija (1791–1847), Ali was an Arab. He was an Ottoman cavalry commander and bodyguard (delibaşı) and kethüda (deputy) of Grand Vizier Hurshid Pasha.

After the suppression of the First Serbian Uprising, Grand Vizier Hurshid Pasha sent his commander Serčesma to the still rebellious parts of Serbia with a large army to meet up with knez Aksentije Miladinović and knez Avram Lukić, and together return the Serbs under Ottoman suzerainty and ensure them of their rights. Serčesma went to the Rudnik and Čačak nahiyas where he knew vojvoda Miloš Obrenović held out. On his way, he held speeches to Serbs promising that the sultan had forgiven them, and he was guested nicely wherever he went. Miloš Obrenović surrendered his weapons at the Takovo church to Serčesma, who returned all but his sabre (to give to Hurshid as a token), as a sign of trust in him and his rule over his people in the area. Upon Miloš's surrender, Lazar Mutap, Arsenije Loma, Milić Drinčić and Hadži-Prodan followed suit.

Serčesma appointed Latif Agha from Slišane the mutesellim (mayor) of Čačak, and Ašin-beg the mutesellim of Brusnica. Miloš befriended Ašin-beg. After completing his tasks, Serčesma took Miloš with him to Belgrade before Hurshid Pasha, who recognized him as governor of the Rudnik nahiya. Shortly after this, Hurshid left the Belgrade Pashalik and appointed his kethüda Darendeli Ali Pasha as Vizier. Darendeli promoted Miloš to governor of the Kragujevac and Požega nahiyas, as well. Darendeli was soon replaced with Sulejman Pasha Skopljak, who didn't follow Hurshid's and Darendeli's acceptable holding towards Serbs, but instead disarmed and extorted them and sent the army into Serb areas to be fed, an administration in the likes of the Dahije. The Ottoman army brought plague into Serbia, and this, together with instances of murder, resulted in Hadži Prodan's rebellion.

== Annotations ==
1. His given name was Ali, and as such was called Ali Agha (Serbian: Али-ага/Ali-aga). He was known by the nicknames Serčesma (Серчесма), and Harap (Харап). Serčesma was a surname or descriptive nickname, serçeşme being a Turkish colloquial word for "commander", itself derived from Persian sar cheshmeh, meaning "head spring". K. Nenadović wrote his full name as Harap-Ali-Aga Serčesma (Харап-Али-Ага Серчесма). Ali-aga Serčesma (Али-ага Серчесма) was used by K. Protić.

== Sources ==
- Milićević, Milan Đ. (1888). Поменик знаменитих људи у српског народа новијега доба [Memory Book]. Издање Чупићеве задужбине – via Archive.org.
- Nenadović, Konstantin N. (1884). Живот и дела великог Ђорђа Петровића Кара-Ђорђа [Life and Deeds of Great Đorđe Petrović Kara-Đorđe]. Vol. II (1 ed.). Vienna: У Штампарији Јована Н. Вернаја – via Google Books.
- Nenadović, Konstantin N. (1903) [1883]. Живот и дела великог Ђорђа Петровића Кара-Ђорђа [Life and Deeds of Great Đorđe Petrović Kara-Đorđe]. Vol. I (2 ed.). Belgrade: Штампа Савића и Комп. – via Archive.org.
- Popović, Đorđe (1884). "Турске и друге источанске речи". Гласник. 59. Српско учено друштво.
- Protić, Kosta (1891). "Ратни догађаји из другог српског устанка, год. 1815". Годишњица Николе Чупића. XXXI. Državna štamparija – via Google Books.
- Sarajlija, Sima Milutinović (1888). Istorija Srbije od 1813-1815. god [History of Serbia 1813-1815]. Pečatano u štampariji Kraljevine Srbije. pp. 337–.
