= Osman Mazhar Pasha =

Osman Sulejmanpašić Skopljak (1789–1861), known as Osman Mazhar Pasha, was an Ottoman Bosnian military commander that rose to the rank of Vizier (governor) of the Sanjak of Scutari (1843–1854), Vali of the Salonica Eyalet (1854–1855) and Vali of the Bosnia Eyalet in 1859–1861.

== Early life ==
Skopljak was the son of Sulejman Pasha Skopljak, a kaymakam and distinguished commander who led troops against the revolting Serbs in the Belgrade Pashalik. Sulejman hailed from Uskoplje, a town near Bugojno in central Bosnia, and was, according to family tradition, a descendant of Qara Yuluk Uthman Beg. Another story says they're of distant Christian origin. Osman had an older brother, Muhamed Bey. Sulejman Pasha succeeded in quelling the first uprising by October 1813, and was thus appointed the Vizier of Belgrade. Atrocities against the Serb population sparked Hadži Prodan's Revolt (1814), which was violently suppressed by Suleiman. Another uprising broke out in 1815.

Osman and Muhamed both accompanied their father's campaign in the Second Serbian Uprising (1815). Following the Serb success in Rtari by the combined bands of Avram Lukić, Miloš Obrenović, Milić Drinčić, Jovan Dobrača, and the capitulation of 500 Turks at Batočina to Miloš, Sulejman Pasha with a detachment made up of Smederevo Turks quickly dispersed the Serbs that held Jabučje. In the attack, Osman was wounded in the hand or leg and Sulejman thus decided to send him with a boat on the Danube to Belgrade, while following by land to ensure his safety. After Sulejman was unable to suppress the uprising, his forces having suffered heavy defeats in the battles of Palež (Obrenovac), Čačak and Požarevac, and generally failing in restoring order in the Belgrade Pashalik, he was replaced as Vizier of Belgrade by Marashli Ali Pasha and transferred back to Bosnia. It is believed that one of his brothers was killed by Raka Levajac after the Battle of Ljubić (8 May 1815).

After the death of their father in 1818, the family adopted the patronymic Sulejmanpašić. Osman married the daughter of Smail Agha Čengić, the ayan of Gacko. They had no children.

Osman served as a muhafiz (fortress commander) in Livno. He supported the Ottoman army against the rebellious Bosnian beys at Travnik. He then served as a muhafiz in Zvornik, and later in Ada Kale.

Čengić was ambushed and killed in September 1840 by the Drobnjaci, in accordance with Montenegrin bishop Petar Njegoš. Čengić was a known tyrant, who had killed Joko, Njegoš's brother.

== Career ==
Osman Pasha was appointed the Vizier of Scutari in 1843. Osman Pasha was by now an exceptional politician and military leader. He held a deep hatred for Montenegro and Njegoš, blaming the Montenegrins for his father-in-law's death, and also wished to follow in the footsteps of his father, Sulejman Pasha. Osman Pasha invaded southern Montenegro in 1843 and seized the strategically important islands of Vranjina and Lesendro on Lake Skadar, which rendered trading between Podgorica and Scutari nearly impossible. The Porte used the opportunity to offer to recognize Njegoš as secular ruler of Montenegro in turn for the recognition of Ottoman sovereignty, which Njegoš refused, and instead attempted to retake the islands, which failed, and Njegoš had no foreign support.

Osman Pasha took advantage of Montenegro's drought and famine in 1846–47 and promised Montenegrin chieftains large amounts of wheat if they rose up against the Petrović, and managed to win over Crmnica captain and Njegoš's confidant Markiša Plamenac and Piperi senator Todor Božović. On 26 March [O.S. 14 March] 1847, Plamenac led a band of rebels in an assault against lower Crmnica alongside the Turks. Fortunately for Njegoš, some Plamenac members remained loyal. About two weeks later, a force of about 2,000 Petrović followers, Katuni and Plamenac tribesmen forced the Turks out of Crmnica. Plamenac fled and sought refuge with Osman Pasha, persuading him to erect an Ottoman fortification on the island of Grmožur to keep Njegoš's forces at bay. Njegoš countered by building a defensive tower overlooking Lake Skadar. Njegoš tricked Božović that he was to forgive him and had him and his brother executed. In early November 1847, Plamenac was killed by a fellow Montenegrin in Ottoman-held territory. Osman Pasha soon incited a second revolt; it was also suppressed and Njegoš had all the rebels shot. Njegoš then sent an assassin to Scutari in a failed attempt to have Osman Pasha killed. Osman Pasha subsequently sent a number of his own assassins to kill Njegoš, who survived several attempted poisonings and an attempted bombing of his headquarters. By 1848, the situation on Montenegro's southern border had stabilized. In 1849, Osman Pasha warned the Porte about Russian agents in Montenegro.

Omar Pasha crushed a Muslim-led revolt in central Bosnia and western Herzegovina in 1850 and had its leaders executed on the Sultan's behalf, and abolished the Herzegovina Eyalet before setting his sights on Montenegro.

In July 1854–September 1855 he served as the Vali of the Salonica Eyalet. He served as the Vizier of the Bosnia Eyalet from mid-1859 to 1861. During his tenure, he was mentioned by the French consulate as the richest man in Bosnia.

| Preceded by ? | Vizier of Scutari; 1843–1854 | Succeeded by ? |
| Preceded by Bosnakzade Mehmed Reshid Pasha | Vali of Salonica; July 1854–September 1855 | Succeeded by Sirkatibi Mustafa Nuri Pasha |
| Preceded by Mehmed Kani Pasha | Vali of Bosnia; 1859–1861 | Succeeded by Sherif Osman Pasha |

== Annotations ==
1. In Serbo-Croatian historiography he is referred to as Osman-paša Skopljak (Serbian: Осман-паша Скопљак) and Osman-paša Sulejmanpašić. Skopljak is the demonym used as the family name. After 1818, the family adopted the patronymic Sulejmanpašić. He is also known as Osman Mazhar.

== Sources ==
- Aubin, Michel (1989). Његош и историја у песниковом делу. Књижевне новине. ISBN 978-86-391-0148-0.
- Djilas, Milovan (1966). Njegoš: Poet, Prince, Bishop. Translated by Michael B. Petrovich. New York: Harcourt, Brace & World. OCLC 263622545.
- Jelavich, Barbara (1983). History of the Balkans: Eighteenth and Nineteenth Centuries. Vol. 1. Cambridge University Press. ISBN 9780521252492.ž
- Kamberović, Husnija (2003). Begovski zemljišni posjedi u Bosni i Hercegovini od 1878. do 1918. godine [The bey land properties in Bosnia and Herzegovina from 1878 to 1918] (in Croatian). Zagreb: 9789536324361. ISBN 9789536324361.
- Milićević, Milan Đ. (1888). Поменик знаменитих људи у српског народа новијега доба. Издање Чупићеве задужбине – via Archive.org.
- Nenadović, Konstantin N. (1903) [1883]. Живот и дела великог Ђорђа Петровића Кара-Ђорђа. Vol. I (2 ed.). Belgrade: Штампа Савића и Комп.
- Nenadović, Konstantin N. (1884). Живот и дела великог Ђорђа Петровића Кара-Ђорђа. Vol. II (1 ed.). Vienna: У Штампарији Јована Н. Вернаја – via Google Books.
- Raković, Aleksandar, ed. (2002). "Omer-beg Sulejmanpašić Skopljak: Pjesme". Rastko.
- Rudić, Srđan; Pavlović, Lela (2016). Srpska revolucija i obnova državnosti Srbije: Dvesta godina od Drugog srpskog ustanka [Serbian Revolution and Renewal of Serbian Statehood: Two Hundred Years since the Second Serbian Uprising]. Istorijski institut, Beograd; Međuopštinski istorijski arhiv, Čačak. pp. 57–. ISBN 978-86-7743-116-7.
- Roberts, Elizabeth (2007). Realm of the Black Mountain: A History of Montenegro. Ithaca, New York: Cornell University Press. ISBN 978-0-80144-601-6.
- Zečević, Alen, ed. (15 July 2025). "Intervju: Prof. dr. Dževad Drino: Sulejmanpašić – najznačajnija vezirska porodica u Bosni". Radio Sarajevo.
