= Aksentije Miladinović =

Aksentije Miladinović (c. 1760, Čibutkovica -- 23 January 1820) was one of the four knezes who played a crucial role at the beginning of the First Serbian Uprising in 1804 and the first knez and voivode to surrender to Hurshid Pasha after the insurrection was crushed in 1813. He also participated in the Second Serbian Uprising and played an equally important role in negotiating a peace treaty with the Turks in 1817.

Knez Aksentije Miladinović died on 23 January 1820 and was buried in the old cemetery in Čibutkovica. The high memorial and the massive stone tablet still mark the place where the knez and vojvode Aksentije Miladinović was buried almost two centuries ago. By the form and design, the memorial is a typical tombstone from greater Belgrade at the end of the eighteenth and early nineteenth centuries. It was cut in harder, greenish sandstone mined in the surroundings for the past two centuries. With its monumental appearance, it dominates the whole area. In the valorization of memorial legacy in Serbia, and particularly in greater Belgrade, the monuments from the Karađorđe era represent a first-class historic and social legacies and their value match the importance of the period. The first to surrender to the Turks was Aksentije Miladinović whom Hurshid Pasha allowed to remain knez of the Belgrade district. Other elders like Avram Lukić of Dragačevo, Voivode Miloš Obrenović and Lazar Mutap followed suit.

His memorial is now more precious in view that apart from written records and the vernacular legends still preserved in this region, there are no other documents about this leader from the Kolubara region, except the songs about his heroic deeds in Vuk Karadžić's collection of ballads.

During the Second Serbian Uprising, the Jagodina and Ćuprija regions, or nahiye as they were then called, were of important strategic and tactical locations for military defence of the Belgrade Pashaluk`s southern borders. An important number of the Serbian troops, led by the regional commanders, were concentrated on these territories, where negotiations were organized for the future relations between Serbs and Turks.

The Jagodina and Ćuprija regions were included in the Uprising from the beginning. In purpose for defending against the Turkish military campaigns, the Serbian military positions on Juhor, Lipar, Taborište and in the village of Miliva, were formed and fortified. Serbian uprisings won in several clashes against the troops led by Suleiman Pasha and Marashli Ali Pasha. For willingness of both sides to achieve a peaceful solution, the peace negotiations were started in Jošanica monastery, and concluded in Ćuprija, by agreement between Prince Miloš Obrenović and Marašli Ali-pasha.
