= Ćaja-paša =

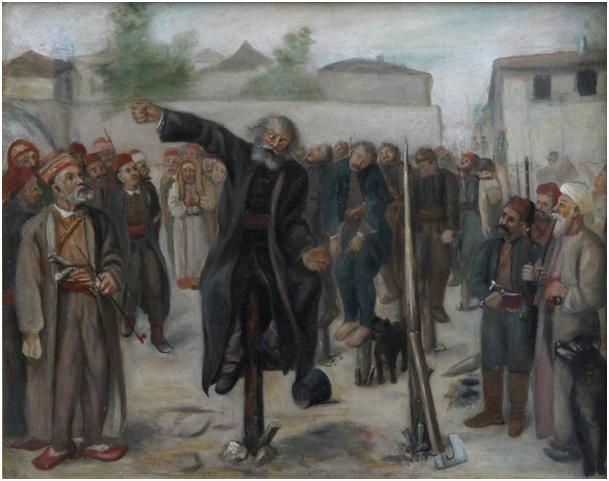
- Ćaja-paša captured hundreds of Serbs which he brought to Belgrade to be executed or sold as slaves. The impalement of Pajsije depicted here.
- Born: Imşir; 17XX; Sanjak of Herzegovina
- Died: 1815; Sanjak of Smederevo
- Other name: Ibšir
- Military career
- Allegiance: Ottoman Empire
- Rank: kethüda, mirmiran
- Nickname: Ćaja-paša
- Conflicts: First Serbian Uprising; Hadži-Prodan's rebellion; Second Serbian Uprising

Imşir Pasha (Serbian: Imšir-paša/Имшир-паша), commonly known as Ćaja-paša (Ћаја-паша, German: Chiaja Pascha), was an assistant (kethüda or kehya in common speech, sr. ćaja) of Sulejman Pasha Skopljak, the Vizier of Belgrade, to whom he was a brother-in-law. He was active in the Belgrade Pashalik during the end of the First Serbian Uprising (1804–1813), Hadži-Prodan's rebellion (1814) and Second Serbian Uprising (1815).

Ćaja-paša was born in the Sanjak of Herzegovina. His sister married Sulejman.

Sulejman and Ćaja-paša suppressed the Hadži-Prodan's rebellion and also took help of vojvoda Miloš Obrenović in making rebels surrender. Ćaja-paša had commanded a force of 800 deli cavalry. Ćaja-paša pursued and captured many whom he had killed at Belgrade in December and January 1815. He had a convoy of captives numbering over 300 of the most notable Serbs that he brought to Belgrade. He made many slaves who he dispersed into harems. People were executed at Kalemegdan. With the outbreak of the second uprising, Ćaja-paša set out from Belgrade for Čačak, but he was defeated and killed in a skirmish by the Morava river.

He was described by a commanding comrade as a better person than his brother-in-law Sulejman and at the time of the Serbian uprisings, he was an old man with a grey beard, of tall stature, and heroic.

== Sources ==
- Bojović, Radivoje D. (1974). "Битка на Чачку 1815.године" (PDF). Зборник радова народног музеја. V. Чачак: Народни музеј: 87–112.
- Gavrilović, Slavko (1987). "Грађа о Хаџи-Продановој буни 1814. године" [Material about Hadži-Prodan's rebellion]. Мешовита грађа [Miscellanea]. 16. Историјски институт, Просвета, Београд: 127–168.
- Nenadović, Konstantin N. (1884). Живот и дела великог Ђорђа Петровића Кара-Ђорђа. Vol. II (1 ed.). Vienna: У Штампарији Јована Н. Вернаја. pp. 120–122, 175, 214, 252, 256, 277, 288, 465, 644–645, 695, 705–708, 714, 726 – via Google Books.
- Novaković, Stojan, ed. (1893). "Iz memoara Ibrahim-manzur-efendije: O nekim događajima u Bosni i Srbiji iz 1813 i 1814 godine". Spomenik. XXII. Srpska kraljevska akademija.
- Protić, Kosta (1891). "Ратни догађаји из другог српског устанка, год. 1815". Годишњица Николе Чупића. XXXI. Državna štamparija: 1–104 – via Google Books.
