= Hurshid Pasha =

Grand Vizier of the Ottoman Empire from 1812 to 1815

Hurshid Ahmed Pasha
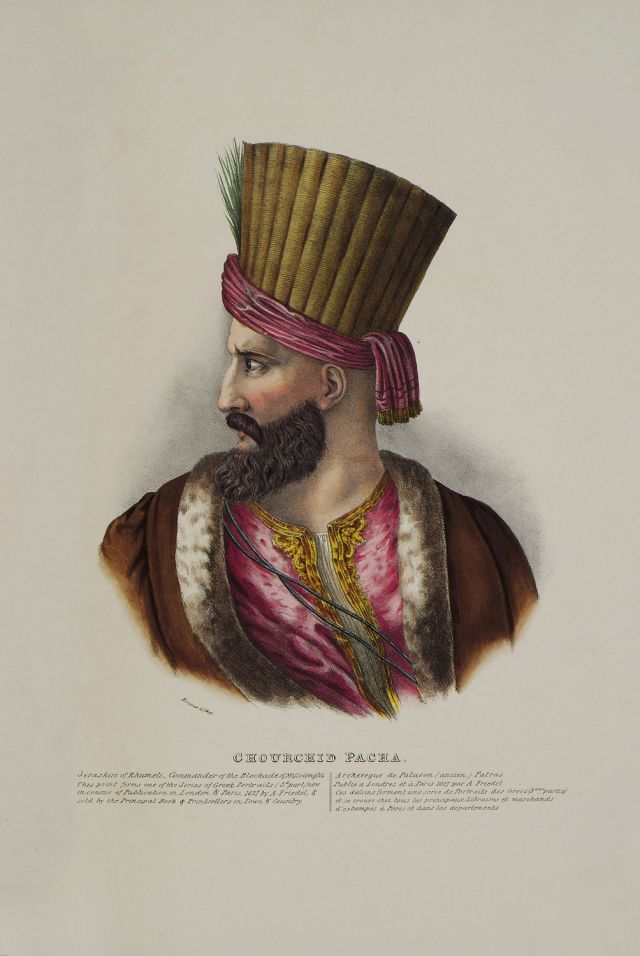
- Friedel, 1832

Grand Vizier of the Ottoman Empire
- In office 5 September 1812 – 1 April 1815
- Monarch: Mahmud II
- Preceded by: Laz Aziz Ahmed Pasha
- Succeeded by: Mehmed Emin Rauf Pasha

Beylerbey of Egypt
- In office 1804–1805
- Monarch: Selim III
- Preceded by: Koca Hüsrev Mehmed Pasha
- Succeeded by: Muhammad Ali Pasha (Wāli)

Personal details
- Died: 20 November 1822 Larissa, Ottoman Empire

Military service
- Allegiance: Ottoman Empire
- Battles/wars: First Serbian Uprising; Battle of Banje (Note: Hurshid Pasha had won Serbian army of Karageorge); Battle of Čegar; Siege of Deligrad (1809) (Note: Hurshid Pasha captured city after siege); Battle of Jasik (Note: Hurshid Pasha lost to Russo-Serbian army at Jasika); Battle of Varvarin; Siege of Negotin (1813); Serbian campaign of 1813; Capture of Belgrade (1813); Second Serbian Uprising; Ali Pasha revolt; Siege of Ioannina (1821) (Note: Hurshid Pasha decisively defeated Ali Pasha of Yanina); Greek War of Independence

Hurshid Ahmed Pasha (Note: Turkish: Hurşid Ahmed Paşa, Ottoman Turkish: خورشيد احمد پاشا, sometimes spelt Khurshid. In Serbian, he was also known as Rušid-paša.) (died 20 November 1822) was an Ottoman general and Grand Vizier during the early 19th century. Of Georgian descent, he was kidnapped and taken to Constantinople as a youth, where he was enrolled in the Janissaries and eventually appointed to several high positions. He successfully suppressed an uprising in Serbia in October 1813 and held the position of Grand Vizier between 1813 and 1815. In late 1820, he was charged with the suppression of Ali Pasha of Yanina's revolt. Soon after this, a Greek uprising began in the Morea. Hurshid Pasha defeated Ali Pasha and had him killed in early 1822, but his subordinates failed to put down the Greek uprising. The circumstances of his death remain disputed; however, modern scholarship records that he died at Yenişehir (Larissa) on 20 November 1822.

== Early life ==
He was born in the Caucasus and was of Georgian descent. He was kidnapped and taken to Constantinople as a youth, converted to Islam and enrolled in the Janissaries. There he acquired the favour of Sultan Mahmud II and occupied several high positions.

== Egypt (1801–1805) ==
Appointed mayor of Alexandria after the French evacuated Egypt in 1801, he was named governor of Egypt in 1804 at Muhammad Ali's behest. Allied with Britain's diplomatic representative, Hurshid tried to get Muhammad Ali and his Albanians removed from Egypt, bringing in the deli (lit. "madmen") light cavalry from Ottoman Syria to counterbalance them. Muhammad Ali won the Delis to his side and, backed by a demonstration of ulema and guild leaders in Cairo, had himself named governor of Egypt in May 1805. Hurshid, abandoned by his troops, was besieged in the Cairo Citadel, which he left only after he saw the Ottoman firman investing Muhammad Ali as Egypt's governor.

== Rumelia ==
In 1808, Hurshid Pasha served as the governor of Rumelia.

=== Serbian Revolution and Bosnia ===
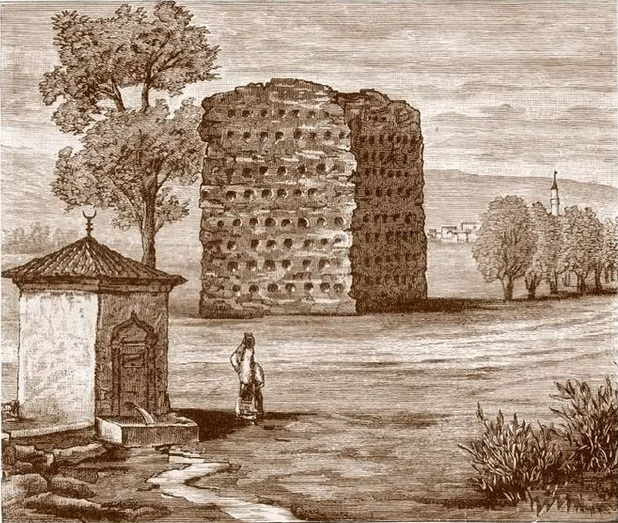
1863 sketch of the Skull Tower, ordered by Hurshid to be built of fallen Serbs.

In March 1809, he was sent to the Sanjak of Smederevo to suppress the First Serbian Uprising led by Karađorđe Petrović. He defeated Karađorđe at Banja, destroyed Serbian rebel units at Čegar, captured Deligrad, lost at Jasika in 1809, lost at Varvarin in 1810, and successfully suppressed the uprising in 1813 through taking Negotin and Belgrade. On 5 September 1812 he was named Grand Vizier (Prime Minister), a post he held until 1 April 1815. He remained on campaign in Serbia as commander-in-chief (serasker) and Vali of Bosnia, and brought the uprising to an end after recapturing Belgrade in October 1813.

After the suppression of the First Serbian Uprising, Grand Vizier Hurshid Pasha sent his commander Serčesma to the still rebellious parts of Serbia with a large army to return the Serbs under Ottoman suzerainty and ensure them of their rights. The vojvoda Miloš Obrenović surrendered at the Takovo church and other commanders followed suit. Serčesma appointed mayors (mutesellim) and took Miloš with him to Belgrade before Hurshid Pasha, who recognized him as governor of the Rudnik nahiya. Shortly after this, Hurshid left the Belgrade Pashalik and appointed his kethüda Darendeli Ali Pasha as Vizier. Darendeli promoted Miloš to governor of the Kragujevac and Požega nahiyas, as well. Darendeli was soon replaced with Sulejman Pasha Skopljak, who didn't follow Hurshid's and Darendeli's acceptable holding towards Serbs, but instead upheld an administration in the likes of the Dahije, which together with the army bringing in plague and instances of murder resulted in Hadži Prodan's rebellion.

Hurshid served as the Vali of Bosnia in 30 March–28 October 1815. He was replaced by Sulejman Pasha Skopljak. He then served as mutasarrıf of Salonica since 28 October 1815.

=== Suppression of Ali Pasha's revolt and Greek Revolution ===
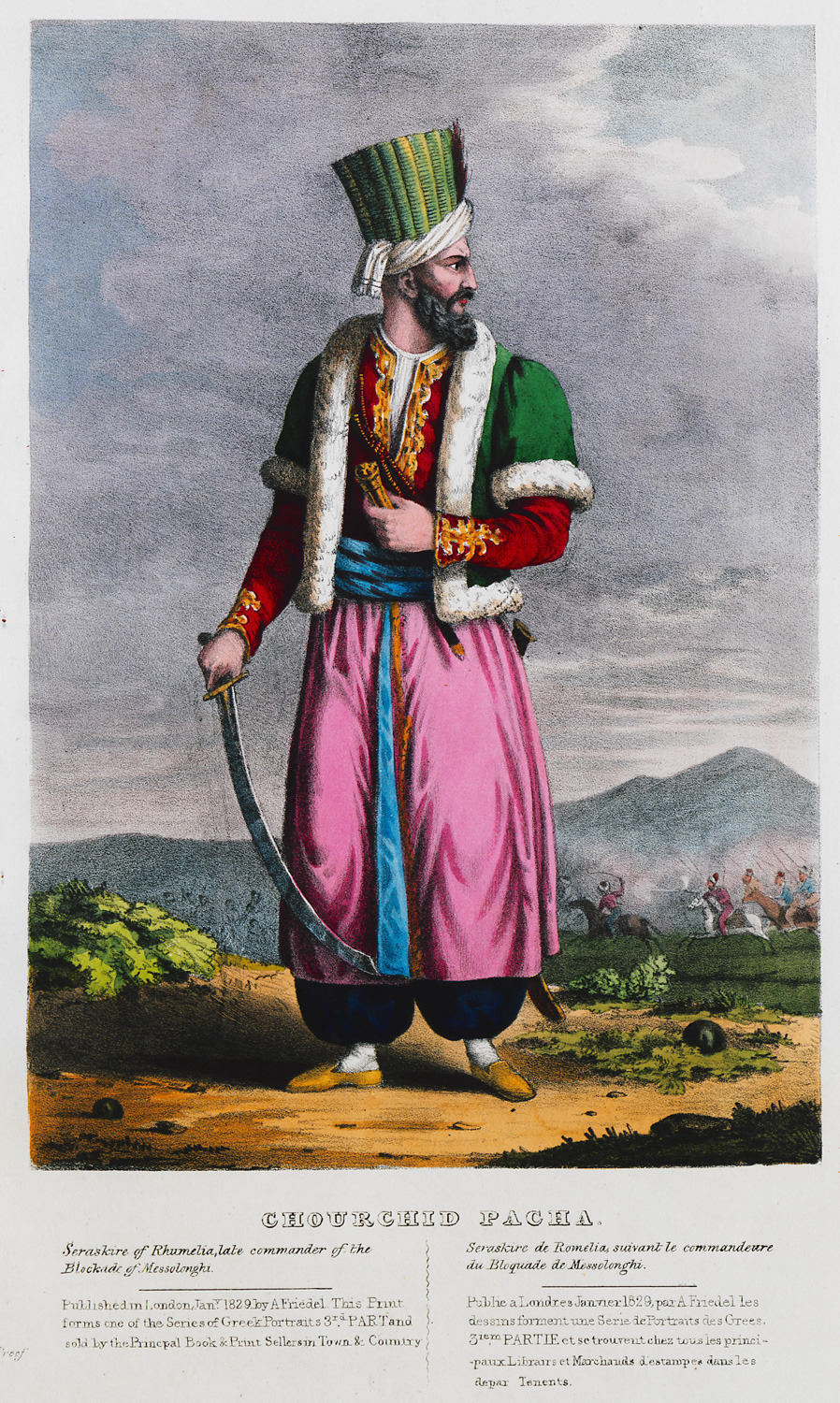
Adam de Friedel. The Greeks, Twenty-four Portraits of the principal Leaders and Personages who have made themselves most conspicuous in the Greek Revolution, from the Commencement of the Struggle, London, Adam de Friedel, 1830.

In November 1820, he was named governor of the Morea Eyalet (the Peloponnese), with a seat at Tripoli and serasker of the expedition against the rebellious Ali Pasha of Yanina. Before he left for Yanina, however, he was disturbed by rumours of a possible revolt among the Greeks of the Morea. His fears were allayed, however, when an assembly of Greek notables visited him on 8 November 1820 in Tripoli. Thus, on 6 January 1821, he left Tripoli for the north, leaving behind his treasury and his harem, while his deputy (kaimakam) Mehmed Salih with a force of 1,000 Albanians remained to maintain order. However, only a few months later, while the Ottoman armies were besieging Yanina, the first uprisings of the Greek War of Independence took place. Hurshid Pasha decisively defeated Ali Pasha of Yanina at Ioannina.

Hurshid immediately informed the Sultan of the events, and without waiting for instructions, reacted by sending Omer Vryonis and Köse Mehmed Pasha to suppress the revolt first in Central Greece and then to cross over to the Peloponnese and quell the uprising in its heartland. At the same time, he dispatched his chief of staff Mustafa Bey with 3,000 men to reinforce the garrison of Tripoli. Hurshid himself remained in Yanina to supervise the last stages of the siege. Despite his rapid reaction, his plans ultimately failed: Vryonis and Köse Mehmed failed to suppress the revolt in Central Greece, while the reinforcements of Mustafa Bey were insufficient to save Tripoli, which fell to the Greeks under Theodoros Kolokotronis after a prolonged siege, on 23 September 1821. Despite the general massacre of the Muslim inhabitants, Hurshid's harem and a part of his treasure were saved. Finally, in January 1822, he killed Ali Pasha through treason, and sent his severed head to the Sultan, and his star seemed on the rise again. He assembled an army of 80,000 men (a huge number by Balkan standards) and was about to march in order to finally crush the Greek uprising, when disaster struck. His political enemies in Constantinople, alarmed at the fame and power he had achieved and the prestige that the successful ending of both Ali Pasha's and the Greek revolts would bring him, accused him of misappropriating a large part of Ali's treasure. Hurshid had sent 40,000,000 piasters, with a statement that they had been found in Ali's vaults, while the Sultan's ministers calculated Ali's fortune at over 500,000,000 piasters. When they asked him to send a detailed account, the offended Hurshid did not reply. Shortly after that, he was denounced for abuse of public treasure and fell in disgrace. He was removed from his positions, and replaced as serasker and governor of Morea by Mahmud Dramali Pasha. Hurshid was ordered to remain in Larissa to attend to the provisioning of Dramali's army.

When news began arriving in Constantinople of the failure of Dramali's expedition at Dervenakia, the Sultan ordered Hurshid to take matters into his own hands and salvage what he could of the situation. However, his opponents continued to plot against him, and reports reached him that efforts were being made to secure his downfall. The circumstances surrounding his final days remain disputed. While some accounts describe his death as a suicide by poison, modern scholarship records that Hurshid Ahmed Pasha died in Yenişehir (Larissa) on 20 November 1822.

== Offices ==
- Mayor of Alexandria (1802)
- Beylerbey of Egypt (16 March 1804–17 May 1805)
- Vali of Rumelia (1808)
- Grand Vizier (5 September 1812–1 April 1815)
- Vali of Bosnia (30 March–28 October 1815)
- Vali of Morea (November 1820–30 November 1822)

== See also ==
- Muhammad Ali's seizure of power
- List of Ottoman governors of Egypt

== Sources ==
- Goldschmidt, A. (2000). Biographical Dictionary of Modern Egypt. American University in Cairo Press. p. 106. ISBN 978-977-424-579-4. OCLC 45089356.
- Protić, Kosta (1891). "Ратни догађаји из другог српског устанка, год. 1815". Годишњица Николе Чупића. XXXI. Državna štamparija: 1–104 – via Google Books.

Political offices
Preceded by Muhammad Al Shurbagi Al Gheryani	Mayor of Alexandria; 1802–1803	Succeeded by Trabluslu Ali Pasha
Preceded by Trabluslu Ali Pasha	Mayor of Alexandria; 1804	Succeeded by Taher Bey
Preceded by Koca Hüsrev Mehmed Pasha	Ottoman Governor of Egypt; 16 March 1804 – 17 May 1805	Succeeded by Muhammad Ali Pasha as Monarch of Egypt
Preceded by ?	Governor of Rumelia Eyalet; 1808–12	Succeeded by ?
Preceded by Darendeli Ali Pasha	Vali of the Bosnia Eyalet; 30 March–28 October 1815	Succeeded by Sulejman Pasha Skopljak
Preceded by Laz Ahmed Pasha	Grand Vizier of the Ottoman Empire; July 1812 – 30 March 1815	Succeeded by Mehmed Emin Rauf Pasha
