= Avakum the Deacon =

Serbian Orthodox monk

Saint Avakum the Deacon
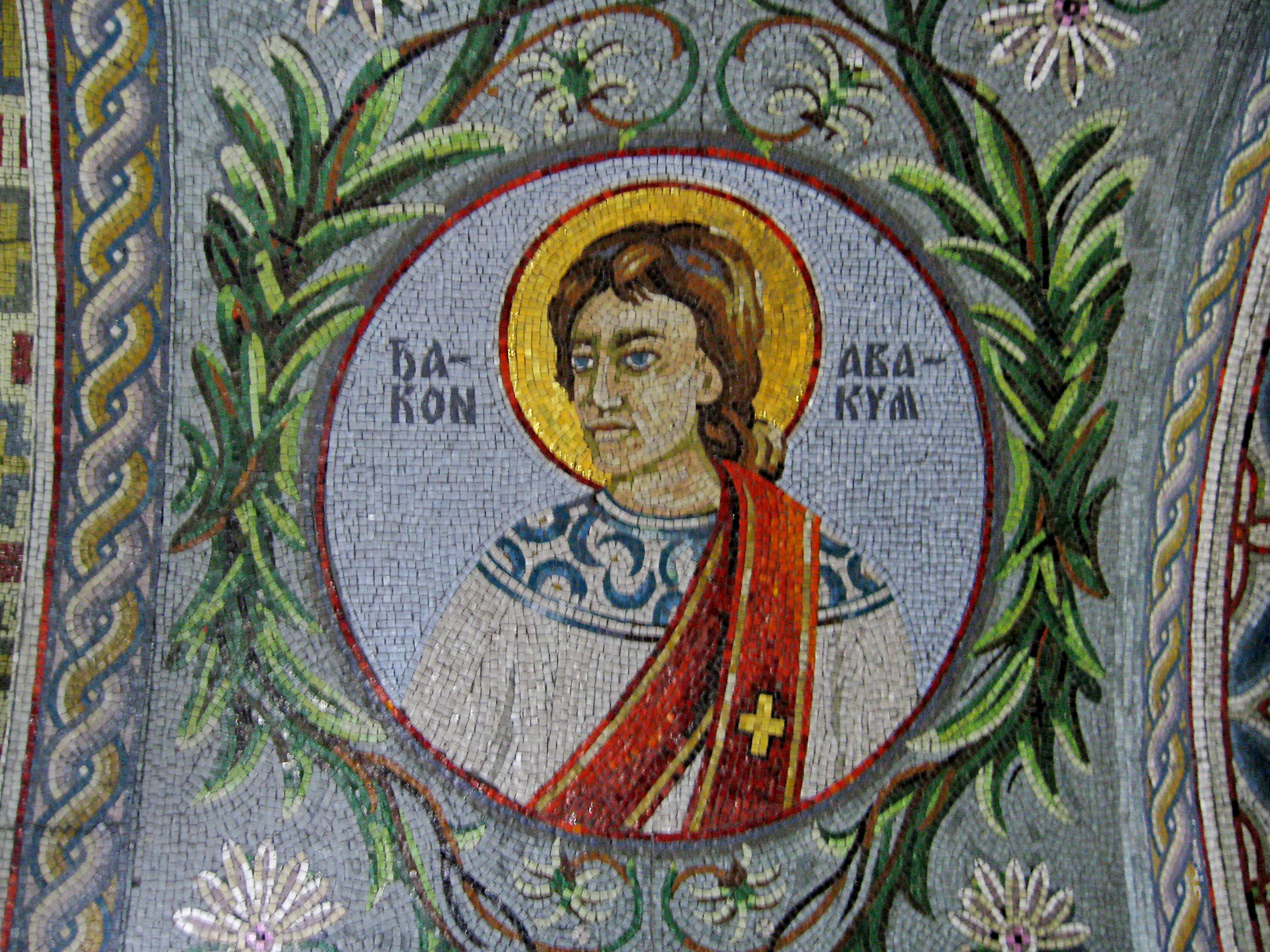
- A mosaic icon bearing his likeness in the Church of Saint Petka in Belgrade

Holy hieromartyr
- Born: Lepoje Prodanović; 1794; Knešpolje, Ottoman Empire
- Died: 30 December 1814 (aged 19–20); Belgrade, Ottoman Empire
- Venerated in: Eastern Orthodox Church
- Feast: 30 December (O.S. 17 December)

Deacon Avakum (Serbian: Ђакон Авакум; 1794–30 December 1814) was a Serbian Orthodox monk of the Moštanica Monastery who joined Hadži-Prodan's rebellion. Suffering a martyr's death through refusing to convert, he and his associate Pajsije were proclaimed New-Martyrs (novomučenici) with commemoration on 17 December. The commemoration is especially venerated in Trnava village.

Avakum is the Serbian version of the Greek name Avvakoum (Αββακούμ, from Biblical Habakkuk).

Lepoje or Ljepotan Prodanović was born in c. 1794 in a village of Knešpolje near the Moštanica Monastery in the Bosnia Eyalet. He was educated and became a deacon under Ðenadije (or Genadije) Šuvak. After pressure by Turks to pay globa (fines), Ðenadije took his son Stojan and Avakum and Avakum's mother with him to find a more peaceful place. They walked across Bosnia and settled at the Trnava Monastery near Čačak, where the hegumen was Pajsije Ristović, living up until then alone. They helped Pajsije with work. Avakum was described as young and beautiful.

After the failed First Serbian Uprising in 1813, the Ottomans began a reign of terror against the Serbs. The people decided to attempt yet another revolt, this time under Hadži-Prodan Gligorijević. Among the organizers of the rebellion were the Trnava clergy of hegumen Pajsije, hieromonk Genadije, deacon Avakum and priest Radovan Vujović. The rebellion was quickly suppressed, also with the help of former rebel leader Miloš Obrenović who rightly believed that it was not the right time for revolt. Pajsije was impaled upon capture. Some captured rebels were given the choice of converting to Islam or impalement; Genadije and his son chose conversion while Avakum refused. The Turks tried to convince him, and while walking the Belgrade streets with the pole his mother stopped him and told him to save his life. He was imprisoned at the Nebojša Tower. The Turks tried again to convince him at the final site but Avakum refused, and seeing his fearlessness and faith they decided to pierce his heart with a knife and not impale him alive, but dead.

The local school of Trnava is named after him.

== See also ==
- List of Serbian Revolutionaries

== Sources ==
- Protić, Milisav D. (1968). Knjiga o đakonu Avakumu. Pravoslavlje.
- Erak, Nikola (2017). "Прослављени Свети новомученици Пајсије и Авакум у манастиру Трнави". Православна Епархија жичка.
- Kragulj, Dejan (2022). "Ђакон Авакум – симбол отпора". SPC.
- Milićević, Milan Đ. (1888). Поменик знаменитих људи у српског народа новијега доба. Издање Чупићеве задужбине.
- Radosavljević, Nedeljko (2007). Православна црква у Београдском пашалуку 1766-1831. Istorijski institut. ISBN 978-86-7743-065-8.
