= Pajsije Ristović =

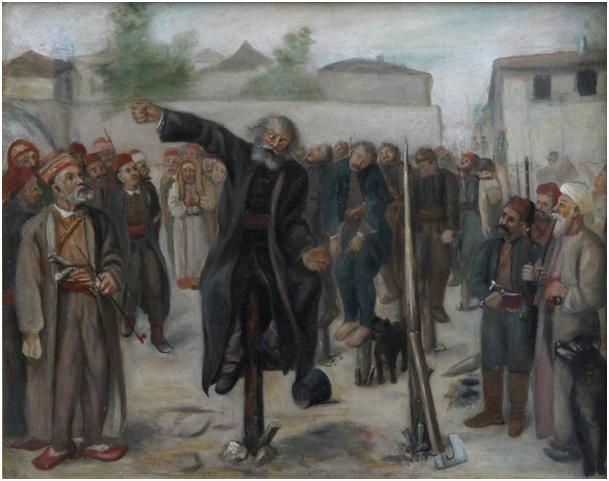
Impalement of Pajsije

Pajsije Ristović (1790–1814) was an abbot of the Serbian Orthodox Church who participated in the first Serbian war of independence led by Karađorđe in 1804. In 1814, he was martyred along with monk Avakum. The following year, Miloš Obrenović led the second Serbian war of independence.

In 1809, the monks of the Mošatanica Monastery who took part in an unsuccessful revolt against the Turks had to flee to another monastery in Trnava, a village near Čačak, where the Hegumen was Pajsije.

After the failed Karađorđe’s revolt in 1813, the Turks began a reign of terror against the Serbs. The people decided to attempt yet another revolt, this time under Hadži-Prodan Gligorijević, and the monks of the Trnava village became actively involved, among them were hegumen Pajsije, deacon Avakum, hieromonk Genadije, and priest Radovan Vujović. The rebellion took place on the Feast of the Cross (September 14), but it was crushed by the Turks. Many people were captured, and some were executed on the spot as a warning to others while the rest were sent to Belgrade to face charges. Among the prisoners were Avakum and Pajsije. The Turks offered to free anyone who would convert to Islam. Some of the prisoners agreed to this, but the majority refused to deny Christ, and so they were put to death, including Pajsije and Avakum. Pajsije Ristović's mother was one of the onlookers during the horrific, deadly torture of impalement at the Belgrade's Stambol Gate.

Saint Pajsije is commemorated on 17 December along with Saint Avakum.
