= Šumadija mountains =

Highland in central Serbia

The Šumadija Mountain Range (Шумадијске планине) is a highland in central Serbia, between rivers Sava and Danube in the north, river Great Morava in the east, river West Morava in the south, and Kolubara, Ljig and Dičina in the west.

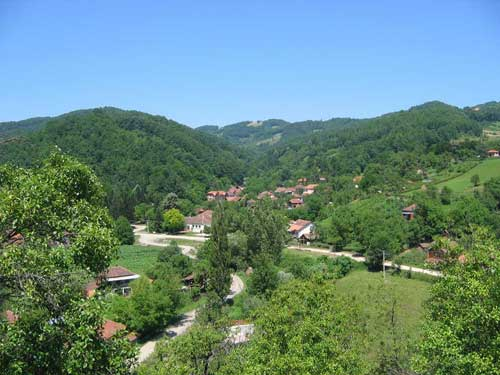
Kalenić, a village in Šumadija

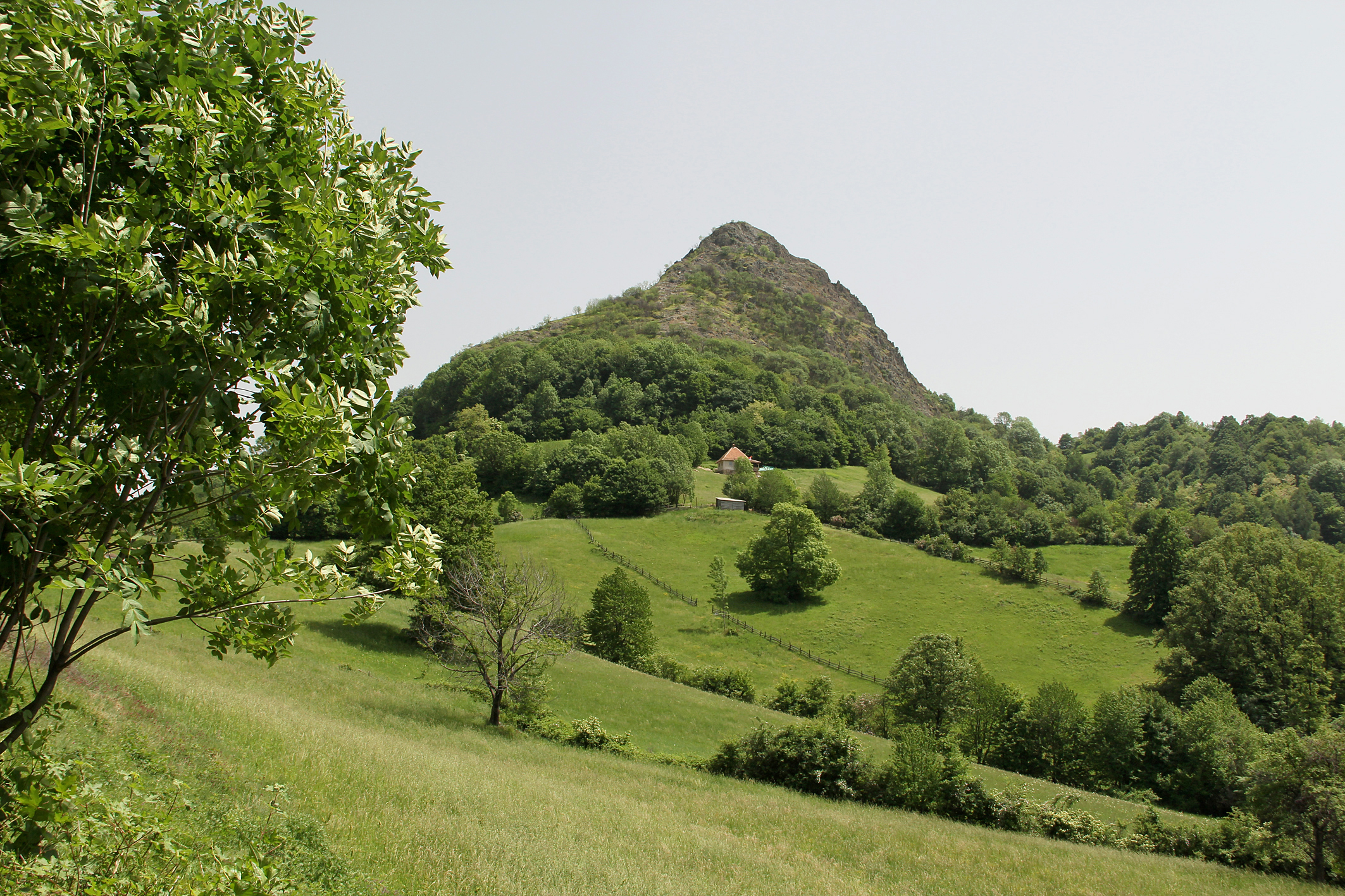
Ostrovica

Its major mountains include Avala (511 m), Kosmaj (626 m), Venčac (659 m), Bukulja (696 m), Rudnik (1,132 m), Ješevac (902 m), Vujan (856 m), Kablar (889 m), Gledić mountains (922 m), Juhor (774 m), Crni Vrh (Jagodina) (707 m), Kotlenik (749 m), the latter including Gruža mountain and Ljubić mountain.

== See also ==
- Mountains of Serbia
