= Gruža (region) =

Geographical subregion of Šumadija, Serbia

Gruža Гружа
- Geographic region of Serbia
- Interactive map of Gruža
- Country: Serbia
- Seat: Knić

The Gruža (Serbian Cyrillic: Гружа, pronounced [ɡrûʒa]) is a geographical subregion of Šumadija in central Serbia, poetically referred to as the "Heart of Šumadija".

== History ==
In the late Ottoman period, Lower Gruža and Upper Gruža were knežina (Christian self-governing village groups) belonging to the Kragujevac nahiya.

During the First Serbian Uprising (1804–13), the Gruža area was organized into a knežina (administrative unit) of Revolutionary Serbia, belonging to the Kragujevac nahija. The Kragujevac nahiya had included three or four knežina (Christian self-governing village groups) prior to 1804, the Lower Gruža, the Upper Gruža, Lepenica, and Jasenica; with the uprising, the Gruža knežina was organized as one.

During Koča's Frontier (1788–91) and First Uprising, Gruža was settled by Serbs from neighbouring pashaliks. During the uprising, the Gruža men (Gružani) were known as brave and reliable fighters, and a Gruža detachment acted as bodyguards to supreme commander Karađorđe. Gruža joined Hadži-Prodan's rebellion and the Second Uprising.

Among the most notable participants in the Serbian Revolution that hailed from Gruža are Stanko Miljčević and Toma Vučić Perišić.

== Geography ==
Landscape in Gruža

The region is located in the valley of the Gruža river, with developed agriculture and numerous settlements. The watershed itself covers 622 km^{2} (240 sq mi), but the region covers 764.5 km^{2} (295.2 sq mi) as it includes the valley of the Velika Reka. The Gruža is a micro-region and makes the southern part of the Šumadija region (also called High Šumadija). It stretches in the northwest–southeast direction, and is bounded by the West Morava Valley to the south, the Gledić Mountains and the Levač region to the east, Rudnik and Ješevac mountains, and Takovo and Lepenica regions to the north, and the Kotlenik mountain to the west. The central part of the region is the Gruža Depression. Due to its geographical location, in the center of Serbia, it is nicknamed the Heart of Serbia or the Heart of Šumadija.

The region consists of two areas, Upper Gruža (with 363.5 km^{2} (140.3 sq mi)) and Lower Gruža (401 km^{2} (155 sq mi)). They are divided by the narrowing known as Tucački Naper. The location was dammed and the artificial Gruža Lake was formed. The reservoir contains 65,000,000 m^{3} (2.3×10^{9} cu ft) of water and covers an area of 9.34 km^{2} (3.61 sq mi), thus permanently flooding a part of the Knić Field. The water is used for the waterworks of Kragujevac.

Other rivers in the region, tributaries to the Gruža river, are mostly short: Kamenička Reka (13 km (8.1 mi)), Boračka Reka (16 km (9.9 mi)), and Ribež (19 km (12 mi)). The southern section of the region, in direction of West Morava, is a composite valley, cut between the mountains of Kotlenik and Gledičke. This section is called the Guberevac Trench.

== Demography ==
The region is very fertile and thus almost exclusively an agricultural area. Even though populated by many villages (58 or 61 settlements), they all have small population and are increasingly depopulating, despite the land's fertility. In the Knić section, population fell from 28,380 in 1948 (69 inhabitants per km^{2}) to 11,729 in 2022 (28 inhabitants per km^{2}), as previously well developed industries in the nearby towns of Gornji Milanovac, Kraljevo and Kragujevac constantly attracted the manpower from the Gruža region (for example, the density of population in the neighboring Lepenica region, where the city of Kragujevac is located, peaked at 215 inhabitants per km^{2} in 2011.

The settlements are mostly dispersed, and the center of the region is the municipal seat of Knić, located 4 km (2.5 mi) west from the Gruža river. The Gruža river valley in the center of the region is the route for the regional Kragujevac-Kraljevo road and railway, which, with the additional road connection to Gornji Milanovac, makes the region generally well connected to the other parts of Serbia.

== Culture ==
Lepe li su nano Gružanke devojke (Oh, mom, girls from Gruža are beautiful) is a popular folk song, written by Dragiša Nedović.

== See also ==
- List of regions of Serbia

== Sources ==
- Đorđević, Tihomir R. (1921). "Кнежине у Србији за време прве владе Кнеза Милоша". Српски књижевни гласник, нова серија. 4: 508–518, 600–611.
- Popović, Radomir (2020), Гружа у Хаџи-Продановој буни [Gruža in Hadži-Prodan's rebellion] (PDF), Српски научни центар – центар за етнолошко-антрополошка и мултидисциплинарна истраживања Срба
