= Ježevica =

Ježevica may refer to:

- Ježevica, Čačak, a village in Serbia
- Ježevica monastery, a Serbian Orthodox shrine
- Mala Ježevica, a village near Požega, Serbia
- Velika Ježevica, a village near Požega, Serbia
