= Jabučje, Kragujevac =

Jabučje Јабучје (Serbian)
- Village
- Location within Serbia
- Coordinates: 43°59′56″N 20°59′29″E
- Country: Serbia
- Region: Šumadija and Western Serbia
- District: Šumadija
- Municipality: Kragujevac
- Elevation: 1,150 ft (350 m)

Population (2011)
  - Total: 165
- Time zone: UTC+1 (CET)
  - Summer (DST): UTC+2 (CEST)

Jabučje is a village in the municipality of Kragujevac, Serbia. According to the 2011 census, the village has a population of 165 inhabitants.

== Population ==
Population of Jabučje
1948	1953	1961	1971	1981	1991	2002	2011
370	370	355	268	240	195	154	165
