= Nil Popov =

Russian historian (1844-1892)

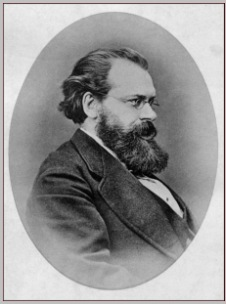
- Born: Nil Alexandrovich Popov; Нил Александрович Попов; April 9, 1833; Bezhetsk, Tver Governorate, Imperial Russia
- Died: January 3, 1892 (aged 58); Moscow, Imperial Russia
- Occupations: historian, philologist

Nil Alexandrovich Popov (Russian: Нил Александрович Попов, 9 April 1844 – 3 January 1892) was a Russian historian, slavist, philologist and archivist, a major authority on the history of West Slavs. A professor at Moscow University (where he was the head of the History and Philology faculty in 1873-1885 and was awarded the title of the Meritorious professor in 1882), and a corresponding member of the Saint Petersburg Academy of Sciences (1883, onwards), Popov published numerous acclaimed works on the history of Serbia, Bulgaria, and Poland. His doctorate study, "Russia and Serbia. 1806-1856" earned him the Uvarov Prize. In 1864 Popov became the head of the Moscow Slavic Committee (which later changed its name to the Slavic Charity Organization). He was also the head of the Archive Committee of the Ministry of Justice and the chairman of the ethnography department at the Society of Devotees of Natural Science, Anthropology, and Ethnography. Professor Vasily Klyuchevsky described Popov as "one of the last major figures from the Golden age of Moscow University."
