= Atenica =

- Small town
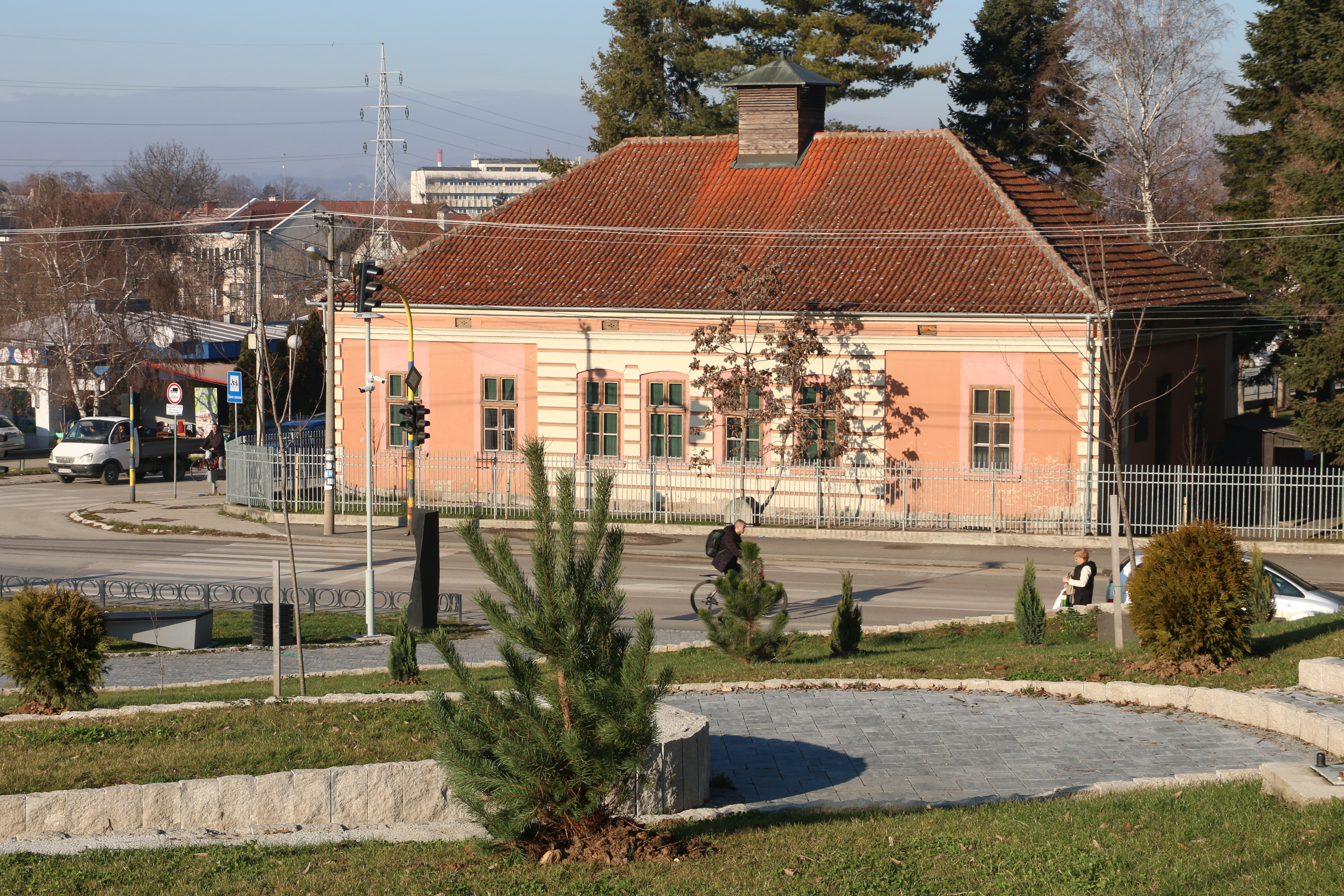
- atenica cacak

- Location within Serbia
- Coordinates: 43°51′30″N 20°21′28″E
- Country: Serbia
- District: Moravica District
- Municipality: Čačak

Area
  - Total: 7.41 km^{2} (2.86 sq mi)
- Elevation: 278 m (912 ft)

Population (2011)
  - Total: 558
  - Density: 75.3/km^{2} (195/sq mi)
- Time zone: UTC+1 (CET)
  - Summer (DST): UTC+2 (CEST)
- Climate: Cfb

Atenica (Serbian Cyrillic: Атеница) is a suburb within the municipality of Čačak, Serbia. According to the 2011 census, Atenica has a population of 558 people.
