= Marashli Ali Pasha =

Ottoman governor

- Born: 17XX; Kahramanmaraş, Ottoman Empire (now Turkey)
- Died: 18XX
- Military career
- Allegiance: Ottoman Empire
- Rank: pasha, vizier

Marashli Ali Pasha (fl. 1815–1821) was an Ottoman governor and general, serving as the vali of Rumelia, serasker of the Ottoman Army in Europe, and the Vizier of Belgrade in c. 1815.

== Origin ==
Ali was from the city of Maraş (now Kahramanmaraş), hence the demonym Marashli.

== Career ==
Marashli Ali Pasha was the vali of Rumelia and serasker of the Ottoman Army in Europe.

=== Serbia ===
The Second Serbian Uprising broke out in 1815, and after Sulejman-paša Skopljak was unable to suppress it, his forces having suffered heavy defeats in the battles of Palež, Čačak and Požarevac, and generally failing in restoring order in the Belgrade Pashalik, he was eventually replaced by Marashli Ali Pasha and transferred to Bosnia. In the summer of 1815, Marashli received order to enter negotiations with the Serbians and ensuring them of improvement of status and end of injustice (zulum). In the end of the summer a Serbian delegation sent to Constantinople failed to reach agreement, and another delegation led by Melentije Nikšić was sent that requested national autonomy and that Marashli be appointed the Vizier of Belgrade. Marashli and Miloš made a draft in November 1815, including the following points:

- The Serbs in the Belgrade Pashalik collect taxes without Turk interference.
- The nahiya seats include also a Serb representative for Serbian affairs.
- The sipahi receive payment according to berat.
- The establishment of the National Chancellery (narodna kancelarija) in Belgrade, made up of 12 knezes, as the highest judicial and administrative organ on Serbian affairs.

Marashli accepted Miloš's title as the main knez, and the end of chiftlik. The National Chancellery proclaimed on 9 November 1815 a peaceful state in the Pashalik and Serbian-Turkish relations. The Porte issued eight fermans to Marashli for the status of Serbs in the Pashalik in the beginning of 1816. The Serbs were not entirely satisfied as not all requests were met. Marashli was in the meantime appointed the Vizier of Belgrade some time in 1815.

Marashli served as Vizier of Belgrade until 1821, being succeeded by Abdurrahman Pasha.

== Annotations ==
1. He was generally known as Marashli Ali Pasha (Turkish: Maraşlı Ali Paşa, Serbian: Marašli Ali-paša). In Serbian, the version Marašlija is also used.

== Sources ==
- Svirčević, Miroslav (2011-01-01). Локална управа и развој модерне српске државе: од кнежинске до општинске самоуправе [Тhе Origins of Local Government and the Development of the Modern Serbian State]. Balkanološki institut SANU. ISBN 978-86-7179-072-7.
- Rudić, Srđan; Pavlović, Lela (2016). Srpska revolucija i obnova državnosti Srbije: Dvesta godina od Drugog srpskog ustanka [Serbian Revolution and Renewal of Serbian Statehood: Two Hundred Years since the Second Serbian Uprising]. Istorijski institut, Beograd; Međuopštinski istorijski arhiv, Čačak. pp. 57–. ISBN 978-86-7743-116-7.

Preceded by ?	Vali of Rumelia fl. 1815	Succeeded by ?
Vacant Title last held by Sulejman Pasha Skopljak	Vizier of Belgrade; 1815–1821	Succeeded by Abdurrahman Pasha
