= Second Serbian Uprising =

1815–17 rebellion within Serbia following its re-annexation by the Ottoman Empire

- Part of Serbian Revolution
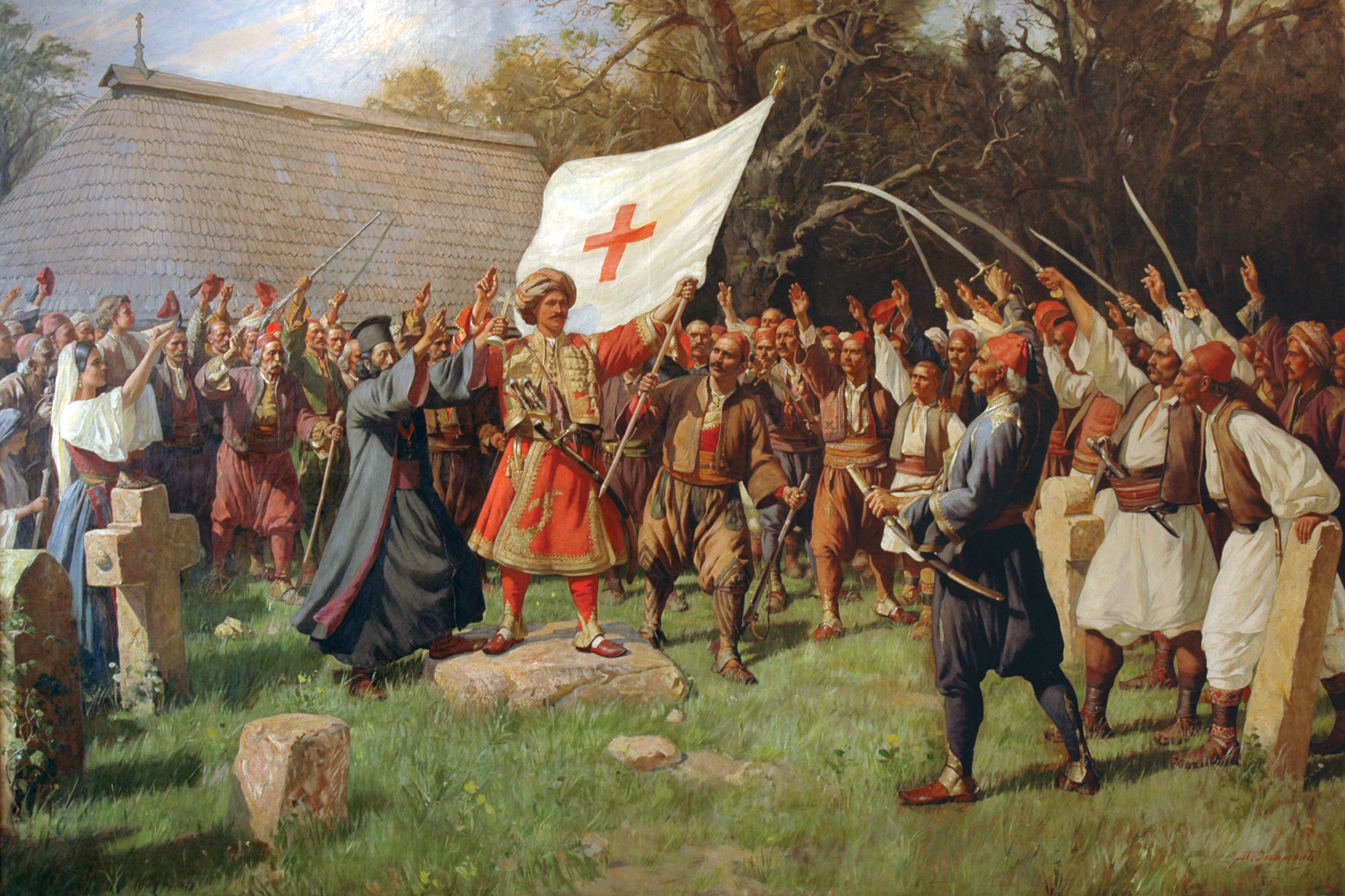
- The Takovo Uprising, by Paja Jovanović, 1889
| Date | 23 April 1815 – 26 July 1817 (2 years, 3 months and 2 days) |
| Location | Sanjak of Smederevo |
| Result | Serbian victory: Establishment of the autonomous Principality of Serbia |
| Territorial changes | Ottoman Empire loses control of the Sanjak of Smederevo |

Belligerents
| Revolutionary Serbia | Ottoman Empire |

Commanders and leaders
| Miloš Obrenović; Jovan Obrenović; Milić Drinčić †; Jovan Dobrača; Petar Moler; Stojan Čupić †; Sima Nenadović †; Sima Katić; Toma Vučić Perišić; Tanasko Rajić † | Marashli Ali Pasha; Sulejman Pasha Skopljak; Hurshid Pasha; Ibrahim Ali (POW); Ali Pasha of Zvornik; Osman-beg †; Serčesma; Ćaja-paša †; Kara-Mustafa † |

Strength
| 1,700 (April); 15,000 and 3 cannons (late July) | 17,000 (April); 30,000+ (July) |

Casualties and losses
| 2,500+ killed | 10,000+ killed 1,000 (POW) (later released) |

The Second Serbian Uprising was the second phase of the Serbian Revolution against the Ottoman Empire, which erupted shortly after the re-annexation of the country to the Ottoman Empire in 1813. The occupation was enforced following the defeat of the First Serbian Uprising (1804–1813), during which Serbia existed as a de facto independent state for over a decade. The second revolution ultimately resulted in Serbian semi-independence from the Ottoman Empire. The Principality of Serbia was established, governed by its own parliament, constitution and royal dynasty. De jure independence, however, was attained in 1878, following the decisions of the Congress of Berlin.

== Background ==
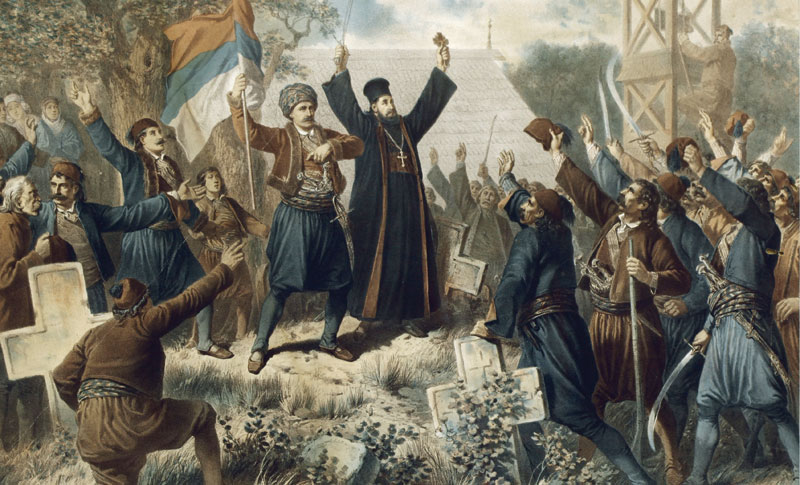
The Uprising at Takovo, by Vinzenz Katzler, 1882

The First Serbian Uprising liberated the country for a significant time (1804–1813) from the Ottoman Empire; for the first time in three centuries, Serbs governed themselves without the supremacy of the Ottoman Empire or Habsburg Austria. After the failure of the First Serbian Uprising 1813, most commanders escaped to the Habsburg Monarchy, including Karađorđe Petrović, leader of the First Serbian Uprising.

Only a few commanders such as Miloš Obrenović and Stanoje Glavaš remained in Serbia. Obrenović for the most part used diplomatic way to protect and share the destiny of the local people.

Obrenović surrendered to the Ottoman Turks and received the title of "obor-knez" ("senior leader") of his home district of Rudnik. Stanoje Glavaš also surrendered to the Turks and was made a supervisor of a road, but the Turks killed him after they became suspicious of him. In mid–September 1814, a rebellion was launched by veteran Hadži-Prodan (1760–1825) in the Požega nahija. He was rebel who had previously surrendered to the Ottomans and was rewarded with a pardon and then became a collaborator of the müsellim of Čačak in the Požega nahija. Following the capture and robbing of some Ottomans by his cousin in the village of Trnava, the Ottomans ended up blaming him as local Serbs rallied around him. Miloš Obrenović, another veteran, felt the time was not right for an uprising and did not provide assistance, instead aiding in the capture of the rebels.

Hadži Prodan's Uprising soon failed and he fled to Austria. After the failure of this revolt, the Turks inflicted more persecution against the Serbs, such as high taxation, forced labor, and rape. In March 1815, Serbs had several meetings and decided upon a new revolt.

== Uprising ==
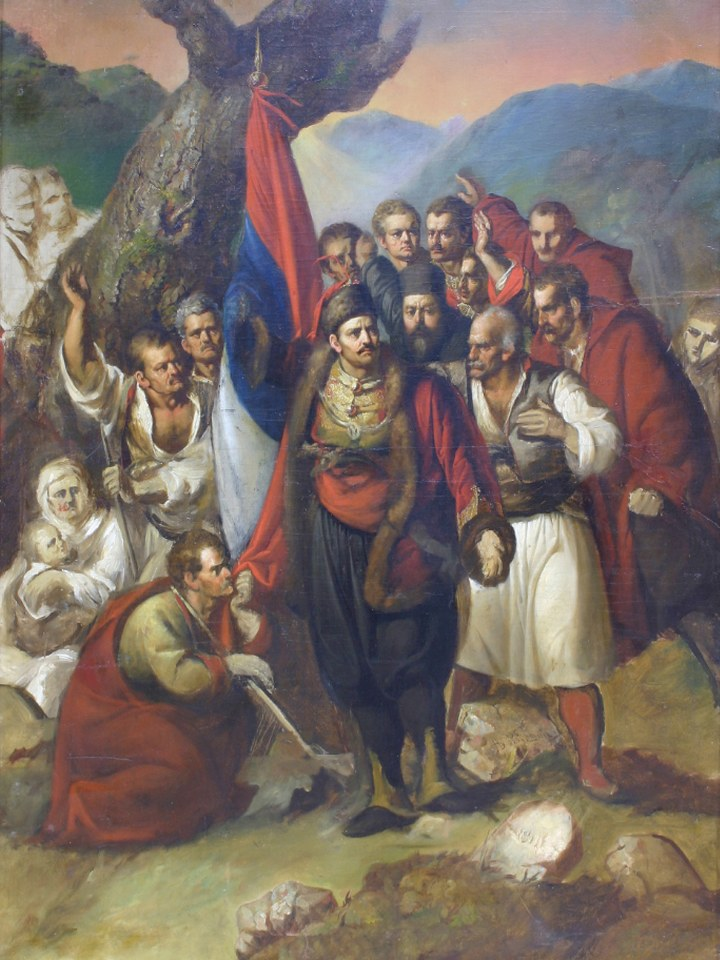
The Uprising at Takovo, by Đura Jakšić, 1876–78

The meeting in Takovo proclaimed open revolt against the Ottoman Empire on 23 April 1815. Miloš Obrenović was chosen as the leader and famously spoke, "Evo mene, evo vas. Rat Turcima!" ("Here I am, here you are. War to the Turks!"). When the Ottomans discovered the new revolt they sentenced all of its leaders to death. The Serbs fought in battles at Rudnik, Ljubić, Palež, Valjevo, Čačak, Karanovac, Požarevac, Kragujevac, Jagodina, and Dublje and drove the Ottomans out of the Pashalik of Belgrade.

In mid-1815, the first negotiations began between Miloš Obrenović and Marashli Ali Pasha, the Ottoman governor. Miloš Obrenović got a form of partial autonomy for Serbs, and, in 1816, the Turkish Porte signed several documents for the normalization of relations between Serbs and Turks. The result was the acknowledgment of the Principality of Serbia by the Ottoman Empire. Miloš Obrenović received the title of Prince of Serbia. Although the principality paid a yearly tax to the Porte and had a garrison of Ottoman troops in Belgrade until 1867, it was, in most other matters, an independent state. Under the grandson of Miloš's brother, Milan, Serbia gained formal independence in 1878 under the Treaty of Berlin.

In 1817, Miloš Obrenović succeeded in forcing Marashli Ali Pasha to negotiate an unwritten agreement, an act which effectively ended the Second Serbian uprising. The same year, Karađorđe, the leader of the First Uprising, returned to Serbia and was assassinated on the orders of Obrenović.

== Aftermath ==
Serbia's semi-independence was reaffirmed by a Ferman from the Porte in 1830, and in 1835, one of the first constitutions in the Balkans was written in the Principality of Serbia. It introduced the Serbian Parliament on the regular basis and established the Obrenović dynasty as the legal heir to the throne of Serbia. It also described Serbia as an independent parliamentary Principality, which outraged the Ottoman Empire and the Habsburg monarchy.

== See also ==
- History of the Serbian-Turkish wars

== Sources ==
- Ćirković, Sima (2004). The Serbs. Malden: Blackwell Publishing. ISBN 9781405142915.
- Pavlowitch, Stevan K. (2002). Serbia: The History behind the Name. London: Hurst & Company. ISBN 9781850654773.
- Radosavljević, Nedeljko V. (2010). "The Serbian Revolution and the Creation of the Modern State: The Beginning of Geopolitical Changes in the Balkan Peninsula in the 19th Century". Empires and Peninsulas: Southeastern Europe between Karlowitz and the Peace of Adrianople, 1699–1829. Berlin: LIT Verlag. pp. 171–178. ISBN 9783643106117.
- Rajić, Suzana (2010). "Serbia – the Revival of the Nation-state, 1804–1829: From Turkish Provinces to Autonomous Principality". Empires and Peninsulas: Southeastern Europe between Karlowitz and the Peace of Adrianople, 1699–1829. Berlin: LIT Verlag. pp. 143–148. ISBN 9783643106117.
- Protić, K. S. "Ратни догађаји из другог српског устанка 1815. год".
- Batalaka, Lazar (1899). "Историја српског устанка II" (in Serbian). Belgrade: Kingdom of Serbia.
