= Slišane =

Slišane Слишане (Serbian)
- Village
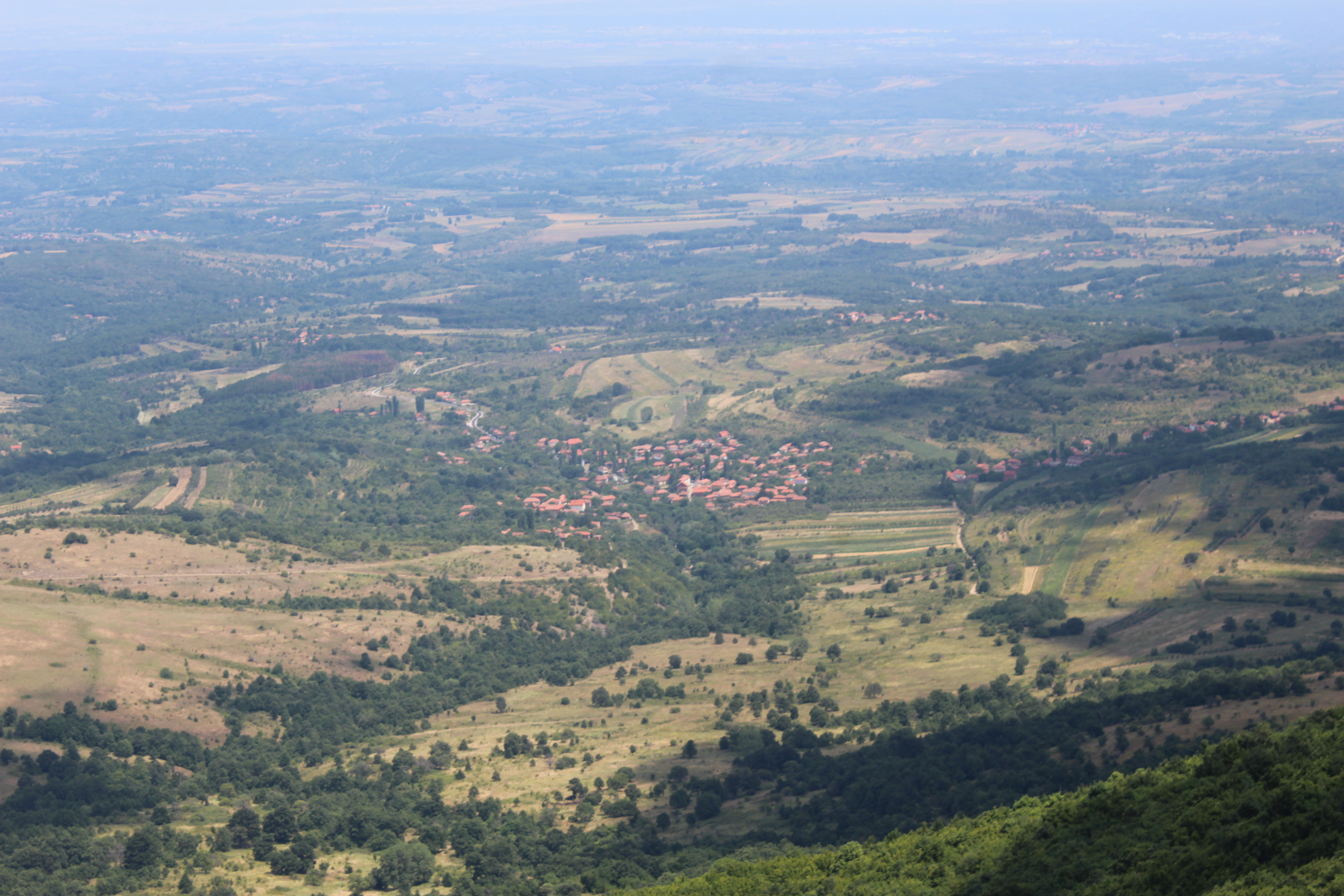
- Slisane village seen from a Kamen viewpoint

- Location within Serbia
- Coordinates: 42°57′26″N 21°35′36″E
- Country: Serbia
- District: Jablanica District
- Municipality: Lebane

Population (2002)
  - Total: 245
- Time zone: UTC+1 (CET)
  - Summer (DST): UTC+2 (CEST)

Slišane is a village in the municipality of Lebane, Serbia. According to the 2002 census, the village has a population of 245 people.
