= Ježevica, Čačak =

Coordinates: 43.8156°N 20.4092°E

Ježevica
- Village
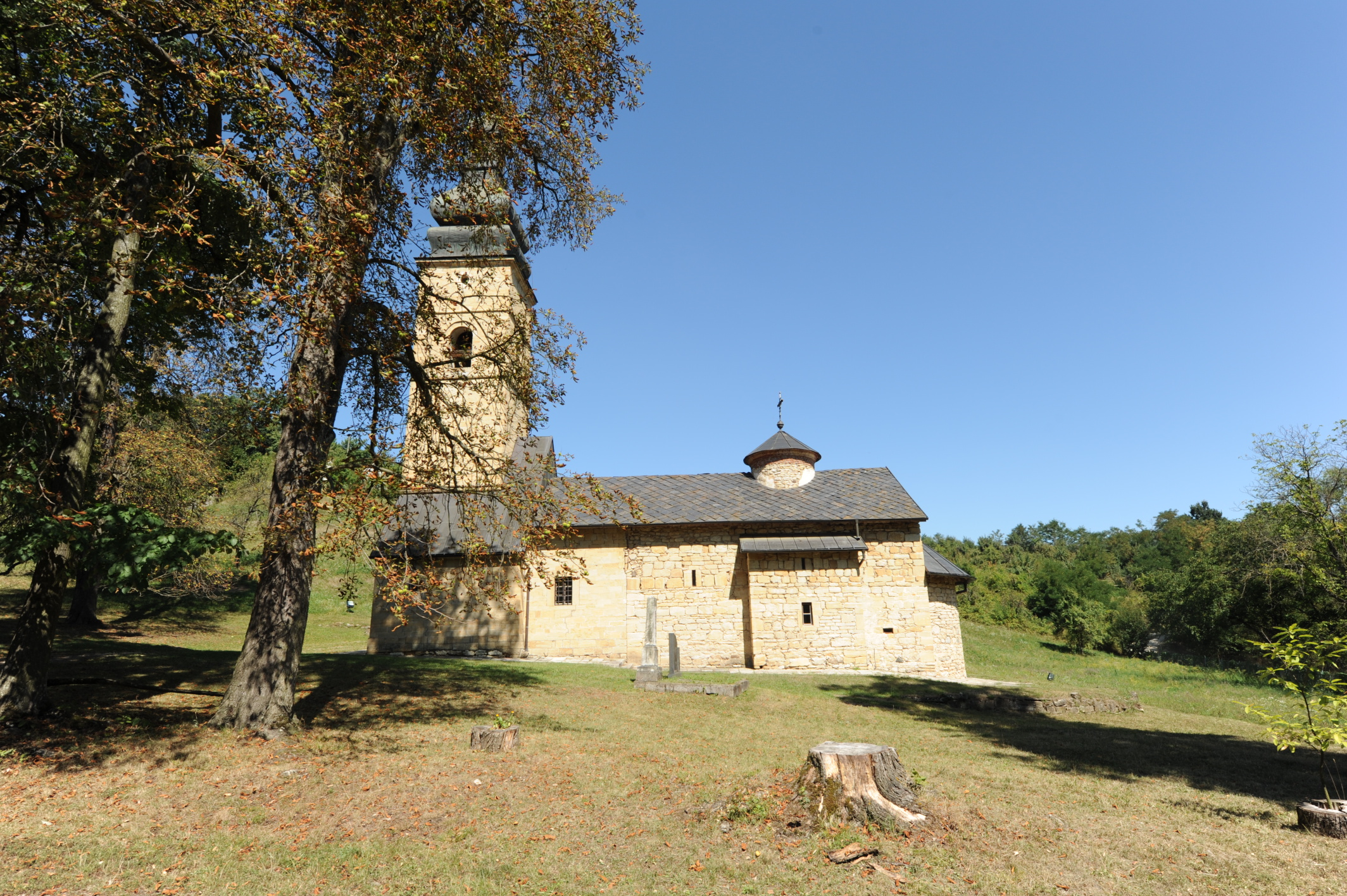
- Ježevica monastery
- Interactive map of Ježevica
- Country: Serbia
- District: Moravica District
- Municipality: Čačak

Area
  - Total: 13.08 km^{2} (5.05 sq mi)
- Elevation: 519 m (1,703 ft)

Population (2011)
  - Total: 1,278
  - Density: 97.71/km^{2} (253.1/sq mi)
- Time zone: UTC+1 (CET)
  - Summer (DST): UTC+2 (CEST)

Ježevica (Serbian Cyrillic: Јежевица) is a village in the municipality of Čačak, Serbia. According to the 2011 census, the village has a population of 1,278 people.
