= Sulejman Pasha Skopljak =

Ottoman Bosnian military commander and governor

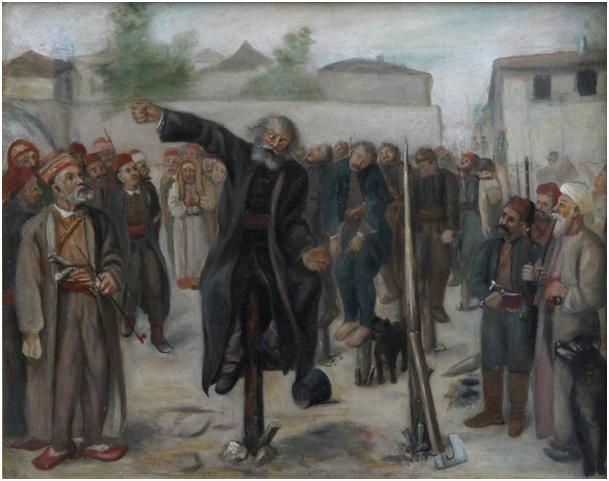
- Ćaja-paša brought hundreds of Serbs to Belgrade that were executed by Sulejman Pasha. The impalement of Pajsije depicted here.
- Born: Sulejman; 17XX; Uskoplje, Bosnia Eyalet
- Died: 1818
- Children: Osman (1789–1861)
- Military career
- Allegiance: Ottoman Empire
- Rank: kaymakam, pasha, vizier
- Nickname: Skopljak
- Conflicts: First Serbian Uprising; Second Serbian Uprising

Suleiman Pasha Skopljak (Ottoman Turkish: سلیمان پاشا, romanized: Süleyman Paşa, Serbo-Croatian: Sulejman-paša Skopljak; fl. 1804–d. 1818) was an Ottoman Bosnian military commander and governor active in Rumelia (the Balkans), who became known for his role in fighting Serb rebels in the 1800s and 1810s. He served as the first Vizier of Belgrade (the Sanjak of Smederevo) after crushing the First Serbian Uprising (1804–1813).

== Origin ==
Sulejman hailed from Uskoplje, a town near Bugojno in central Bosnia. The family tradition holds that they originate from a branch of the family of Qara Yuluk Uthman Beg that came to Bosnia in the 16th century. According to Sulejman's great-grandson, the poet Omer Bey Sulejmanpašić (1870–1918), the family originated from Mihailo, a Bosnian nobleman who held the fort of Vesela Straža, then after the Ottoman conquest converted into Islam, becoming Ali Pasha (Ali-paša).

== Career ==
The First Serbian Uprising broke out in the Sanjak of Smederevo (today central Serbia) in 1804, and echoed in other Serb-inhabited lands in the Ottoman Empire. After the Drobnjak Rebellion broke out in March 1805, and expanded in the eastern Sanjak of Herzegovina (now in Montenegro), the Ottoman government sent Sulejman Pasha in the beginning of October to suppress it. Suleiman Pasha was one of the most courageous and resolute Ottoman commanders at that time. By January 1806, the Drobnjak rebellion was suppressed, and Sulejman Pasha had the rebel leaders punished, and forced the population of Drobnjak and Morača to pay tribute. In March 1806, Sulejman Pasha defeated the Serbian rebel band of Radič Petrović near the Studenica Monastery. He commanded the Ottoman army sent from Bosnia that was decisively defeated at Mišar by the Serbian rebels in August 1806. After the defeat, he retreated to Šabac, but was forced to hand over the town to Karađorđe, the leader of the Serbian Uprising, in February 1807. In the Ottoman campaign in Serbia in 1813, Sulejman commanded part of the forces that took Loznica, and also participated in the battle of Ravnje, in which he was wounded, at the end of August. After the Ottoman suppression of the First Serbian Uprising (by October 1813), Suleiman was appointed the Vizier of Belgrade (the Sanjak of Smederevo). The Ottoman atrocities against the Serb population sparked Hadži-Prodan's rebellion (1814), which was violently suppressed by Sulejman. The Second Serbian Uprising broke out in 1815, and after Sulejman was unable to suppress it, his forces having suffered heavy defeats in the battles of Palež, Čačak and Požarevac, and generally failing in restoring order in the Belgrade Pashalik, he was replaced by Marashli Ali Pasha and transferred to Bosnia. It is believed that one of his sons were killed by Raka Levajac after the Battle of Ljubić (8 May 1815).

After his death in 1818, his sons adopted the patronymic Sulejmanpašić. His son Osman (1789–1861) rose to the rank of Vizier and Vali.

== Sources ==
- Kamberović, Husnija (2003). Begovski zemljišni posjedi u Bosni i Hercegovini od 1878. do 1918. godine [The bey land properties in Bosnia and Herzegovina from 1878 to 1918] (in Croatian). Zagreb: 9789536324361. ISBN 9789536324361.
- Milićević, Milan Đ. (1888). Pomenik znamenitih ljudi u srpskog naroda novijega doba [The memorial of notable people in the Serbian nation of modern times] (in Serbian). Srpska Kraljevska Štamparija (Serbian Royal Printing House).
- Raković, Aleksandar, ed. (2002). "Omer-beg Sulejmanpašić Skopljak: Pjesme". Rastko.
- Rudić, Srđan; Pavlović, Lela (2016). Srpska revolucija i obnova državnosti Srbije: Dvesta godina od Drugog srpskog ustanka [Serbian Revolution and Renewal of Serbian Statehood: Two Hundred Years since the Second Serbian Uprising]. Istorijski institut, Beograd; Međuopštinski istorijski arhiv, Čačak. pp. 57–. ISBN 978-86-7743-116-7.
- Zečević, Alen, ed. (15 July 2025). "Intervju: Prof. dr. Dževad Drino: Sulejmanpašić – najznačajnija vezirska porodica u Bosni". Radio Sarajevo.

Preceded by Darendeli Ali Pasha	Vizier of Belgrade; 1813–1815	Succeeded by Marashli Ali Pasha
