= Ješevac =

Mountain in Serbia

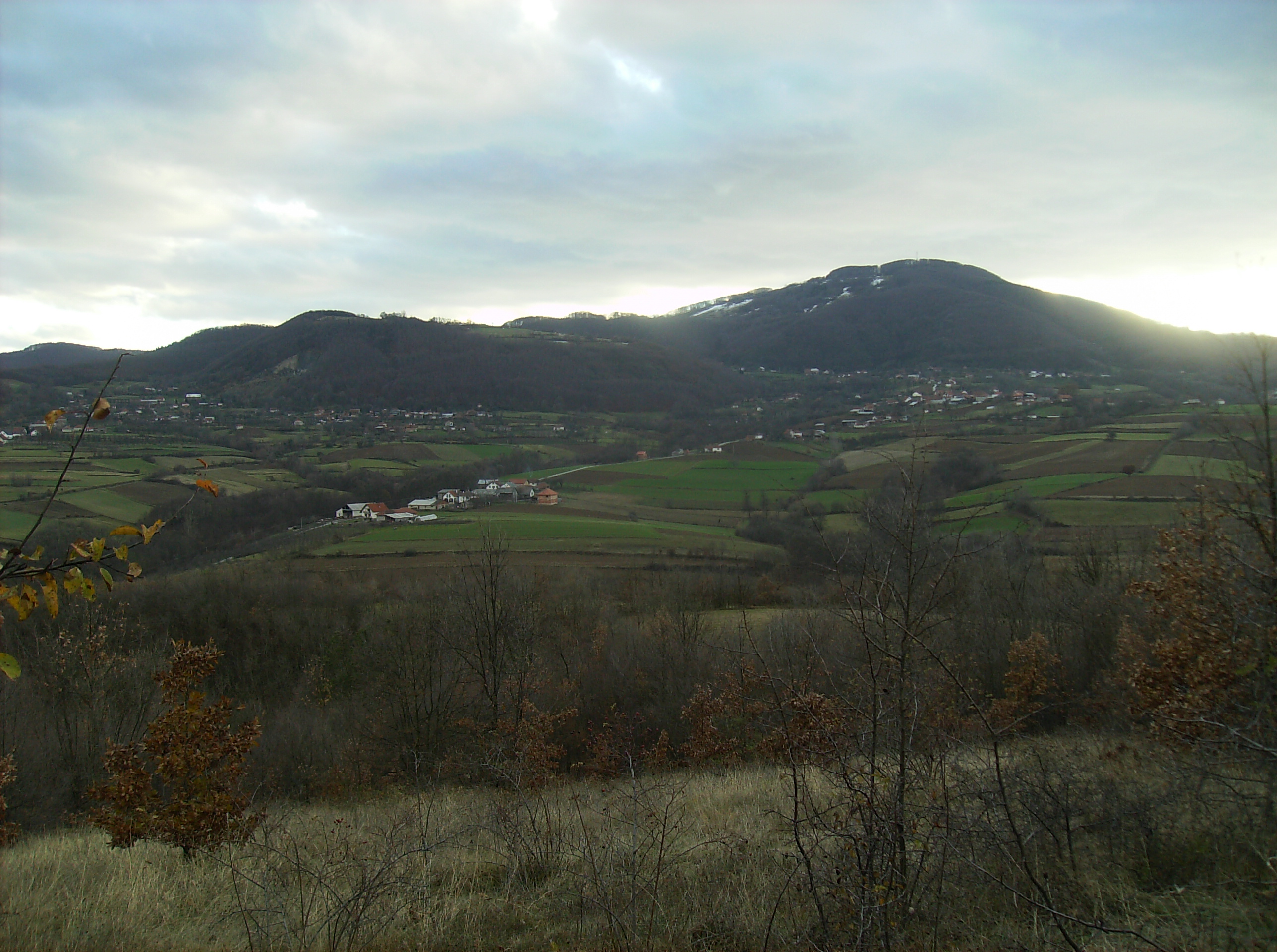

Highest point
- Elevation: 902 m (2,959 ft)
- Coordinates: 44°00′17″N 20°33′12″E

Geography
- Location within Serbia
- Location: Central Serbia
- Parent range: Dinaric Alps

Ješevac (Serbian Cyrillic: Јешевац) is a mountain in central Serbia, near the town of Gornji Milanovac. Its highest peak, Crni vrh, has an elevation of 902 meters above sea level.

== See also ==
- List of mountains in Serbia
