= Hadži Prodan =

Serbian military commander (c. 1760 – 1825)

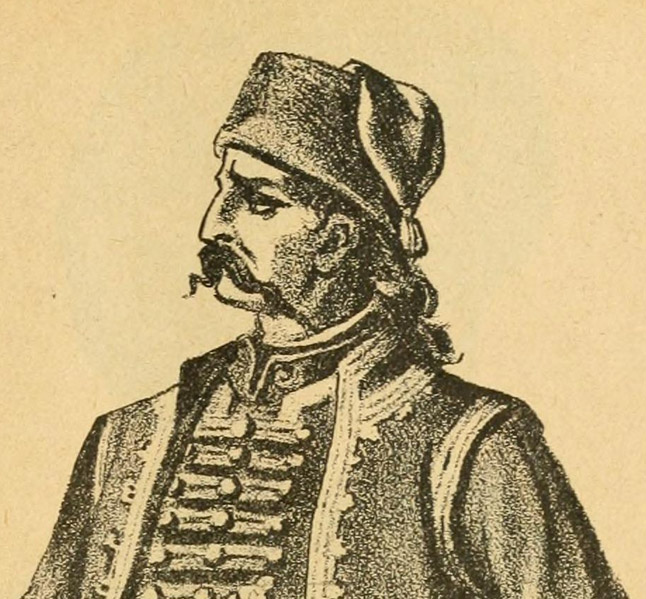
- Born: Prodan Gligorijević c. 1760; Sjenica, Serbia
- Died: 1825 (aged 64–65)
- Military career
- Allegiance: (Serbia) Serbian revolutionaries (1806–1815); Greek revolutionaries (1821–1825)
- Service years: 1806–1825
- Nickname: Hadži-Prodan
- Conflicts: First Serbian Uprising (1804–1813); Hadži Prodan's Revolt (1814); Greek War of Independence (1821–1825)

Prodan Gligorijević (Serbian: Продан Глигоријевић; c. 1760–1825), known as Hadži-Prodan (Хаџи-Продан), was a Serbian revolutionary commander (vojvoda) in the First Serbian Uprising of the Serbian Revolution, then the Greek War of Independence, against the Ottoman Empire. He led an unsuccessful rebellion in 1814, dubbed Hadži-Prodan's rebellion.

== Life ==
Prodan Gligorijević was born around 1760, and he hailed from Sjenica. His epithet, hajji, is a honorific title given to Christians that completed the pilgrimage to the Holy Land (Jerusalem).

He joined the fighting in 1806. Prodan participated in the battles of Sjenica, Nova Varoš, Prijepolje, Bijelo Polje, and Suvodol (1809). After the fall of the uprising (Hursid Pasha captured Belgrade in October 1813), his unit stayed in Mučnja for some months. He gave himself up to the Ottomans and settled in the Trnava monastery in Čačak.

As the Ottoman tyranny continued, he was put to lead the rebellion in the Požega area. His badly organized rebellion against the Ottomans in the Čačak region in 1814, known as Hadži-Prodan's rebellion, was quickly beaten. He fled, first to Austria in 1815; then to Wallachia, where he joined the Greek War of Independence in 1821. He died in 1825.

== See also ==
- Giorgakis Olympios (1772–1821), fellow Greek revolutionary in the First Serbian Uprising and Greek War
- Vasos Mavrovouniotis (1797–1847), fellow Montenegrin Serb revolutionary in the Greek War
- Hadži-Prodan's Cave
- List of Serbian Revolutionaries
