= Deli (Ottoman) =

Military unit in the Ottoman Empire

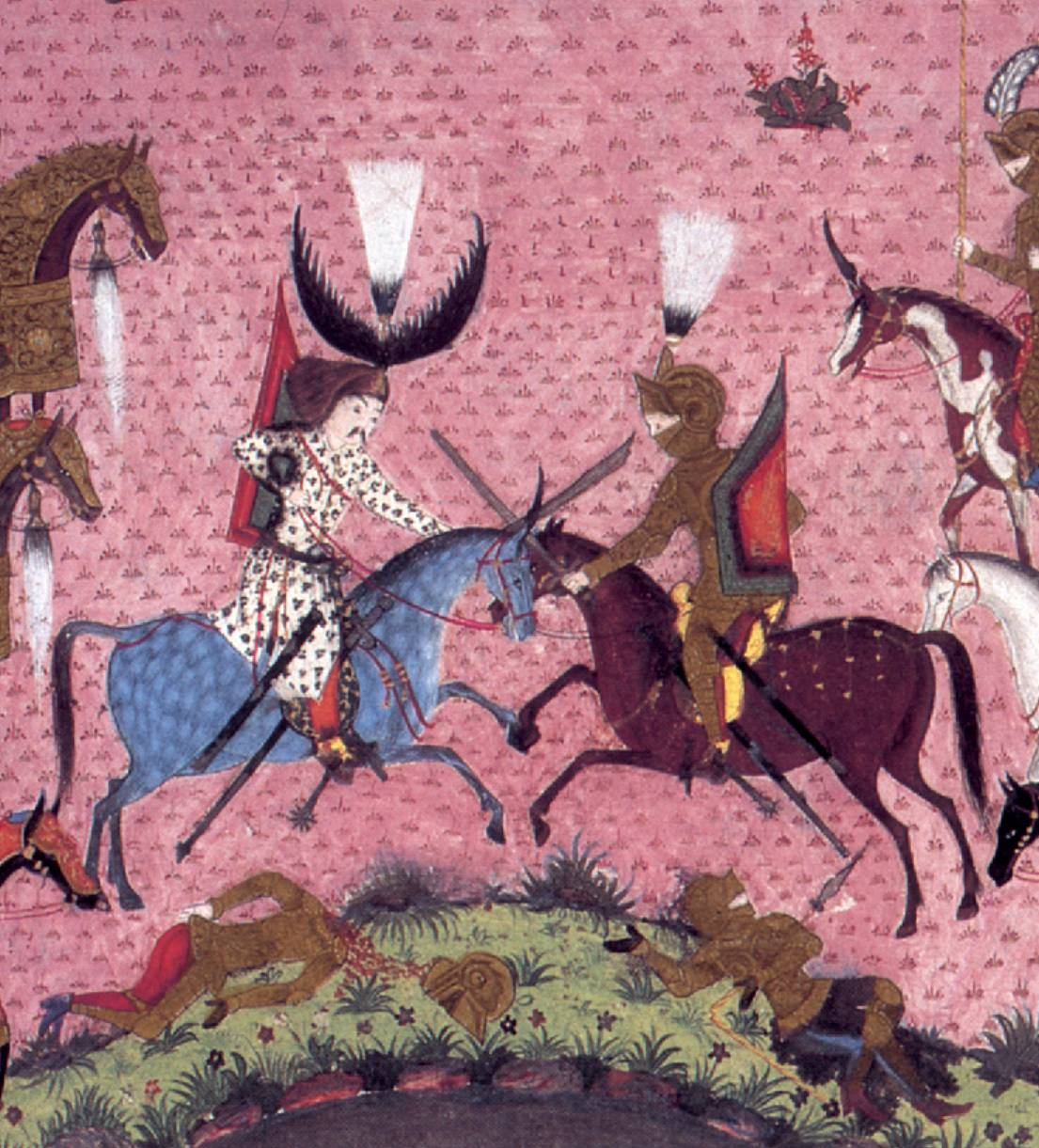
- A Deli (left) in a battle with a Hungarian soldier
- Active: mid-15th century–1829
- Disbanded: 1829 reforms
- Allegiance: Ottoman Empire
- Type: Light cavalry
- Role: Shock troops, skirmisher, frontier security, bodyguarding
- Garrison/HQ: Rumelia; Anatolia
- Nickname: "mad men"

Deli (from Turkish: deli, meaning "mad, wild, daring") was an Ottoman light cavalry unit which acted as frontline shock troops, skirmishers, and personal guards for high-level Ottoman officials in Rumelia during peacetime. The unit is usually confused in earlier historical records with the Akinji, both being light cavalry units and being part of Eyalet soldiers, although they were not related. The sipahi constituted the main and traditional cavalry force of the Ottoman Empire.

The unit was first established in the Rumelia Eyalet (Ottoman-held Balkans) in the mid-15th century as frontier troops and border protection. It came to full potential in the 16th century, as organized by the Sanjak-beys of Bosnia and Smederevo (central Serbia). Gazi Husrev Bey is most associated with these troops, as he employed about 10,000 of them; due to their efficiency, other governors in Rumelia adopted them as well. The majority were Turkic or chosen from among the native Islamized Balkan peoples.

By the late 18th century the Deli volunteers were the most numerous cavalry force and were found in most Ottoman provinces.

Sultan Mahmud II abolished the unit in 1829, along with the disbandment of the Janissaries, in attempts to reform the army and establish one on the Western model.

== Syria ==
In the 19th century, Ottoman Syria's best units were the Deli and the Maghariba (North African mercenaries), as they were mobile, as opposed to the stationary Janissaries.

== In popular culture ==
In the Turkish movie, Deliler Fatih'in Fermanı: directed by Osman Kaya, a small group of Delis is sent to Wallachia in order to kill the Romanian Prince Vlad the Impaler.

== Gallery ==
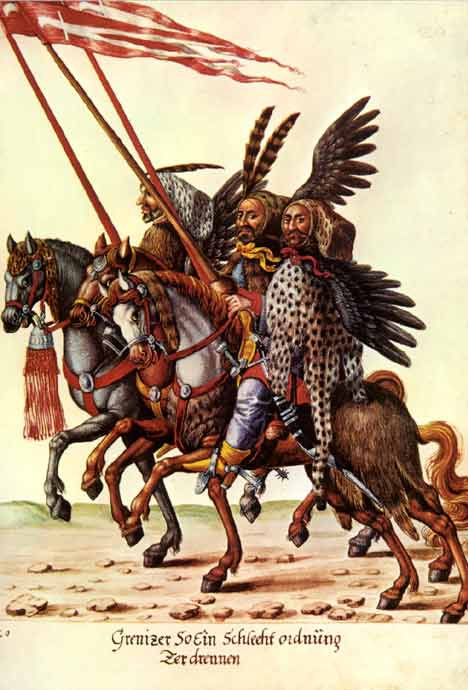
Delis (1590)

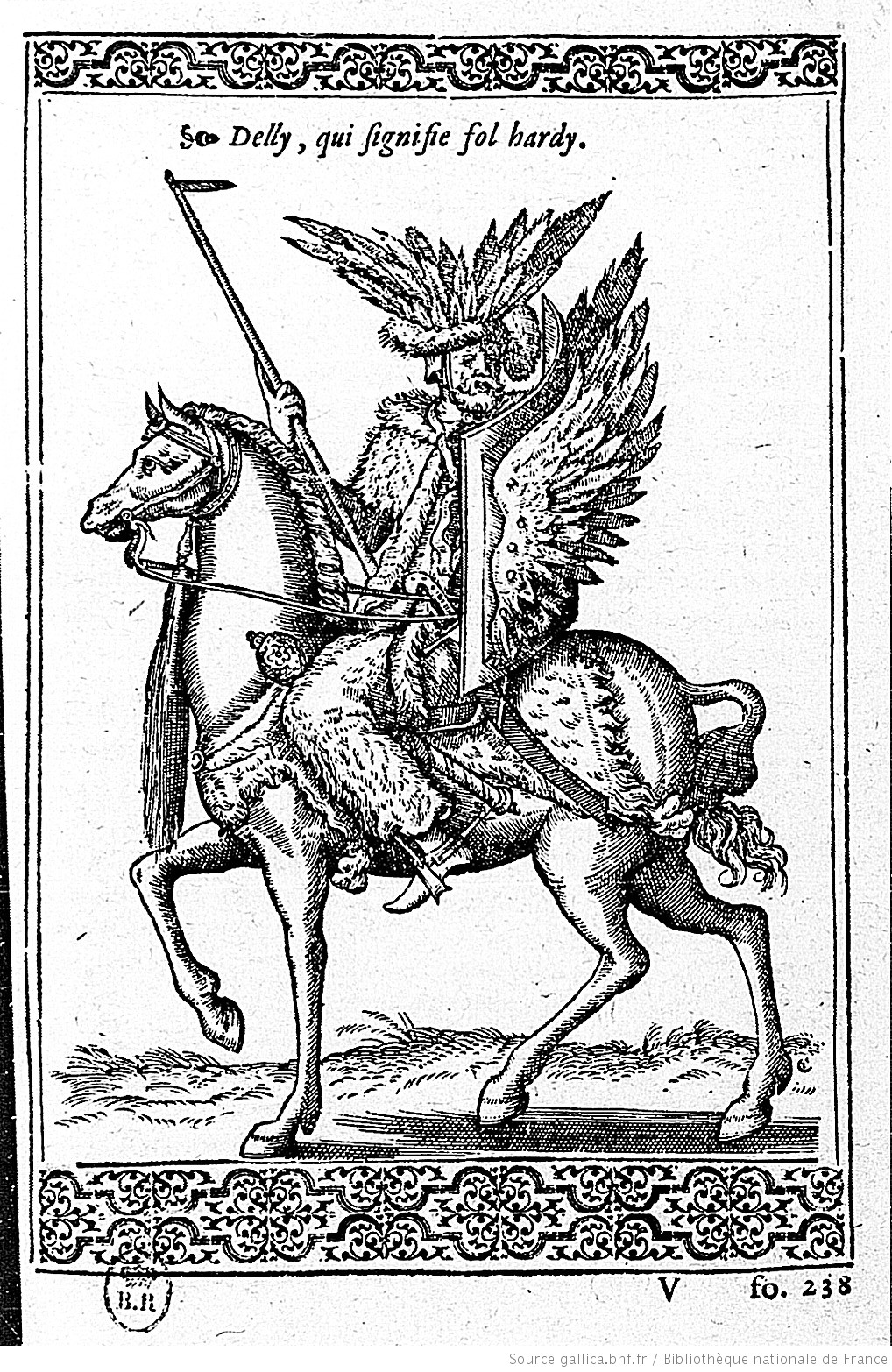
Deli horseman from a 1576 Italian edition of Nicolas de Nicolay's Travels in Turkey

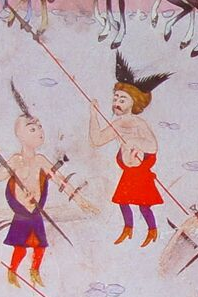
Surname-i Hümayun (1582-1587)

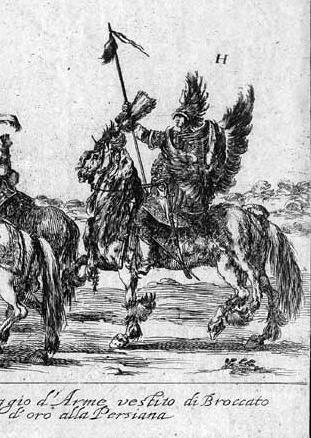
Deli Stefano Della

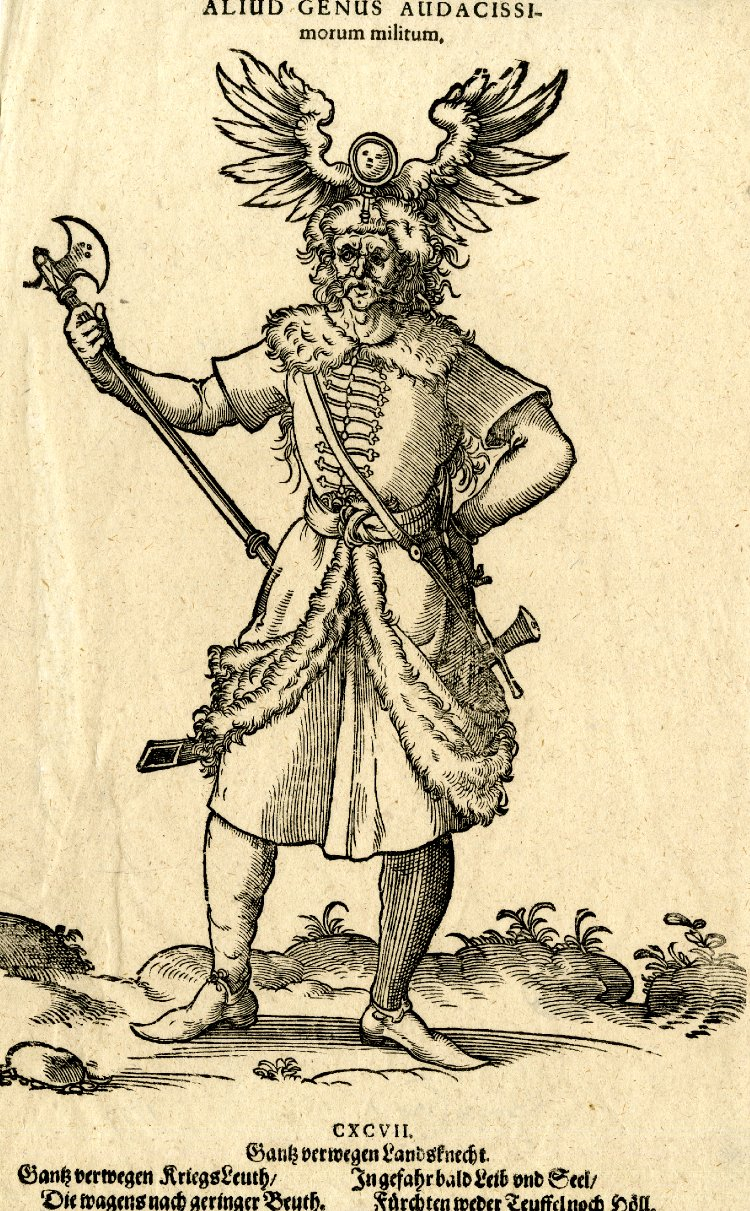
Ottoman Military Illustrations from Hans Weigel's Habitus Praecipuorum Populorum (Trachtenbuch), 1577

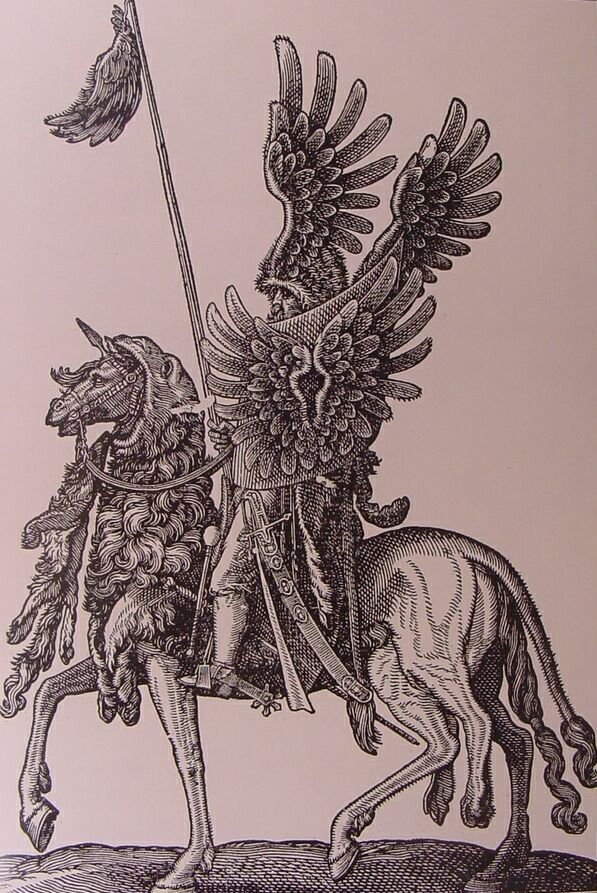
Deli in parade uniform, paint from 1688 Melchior Lorichs 1583

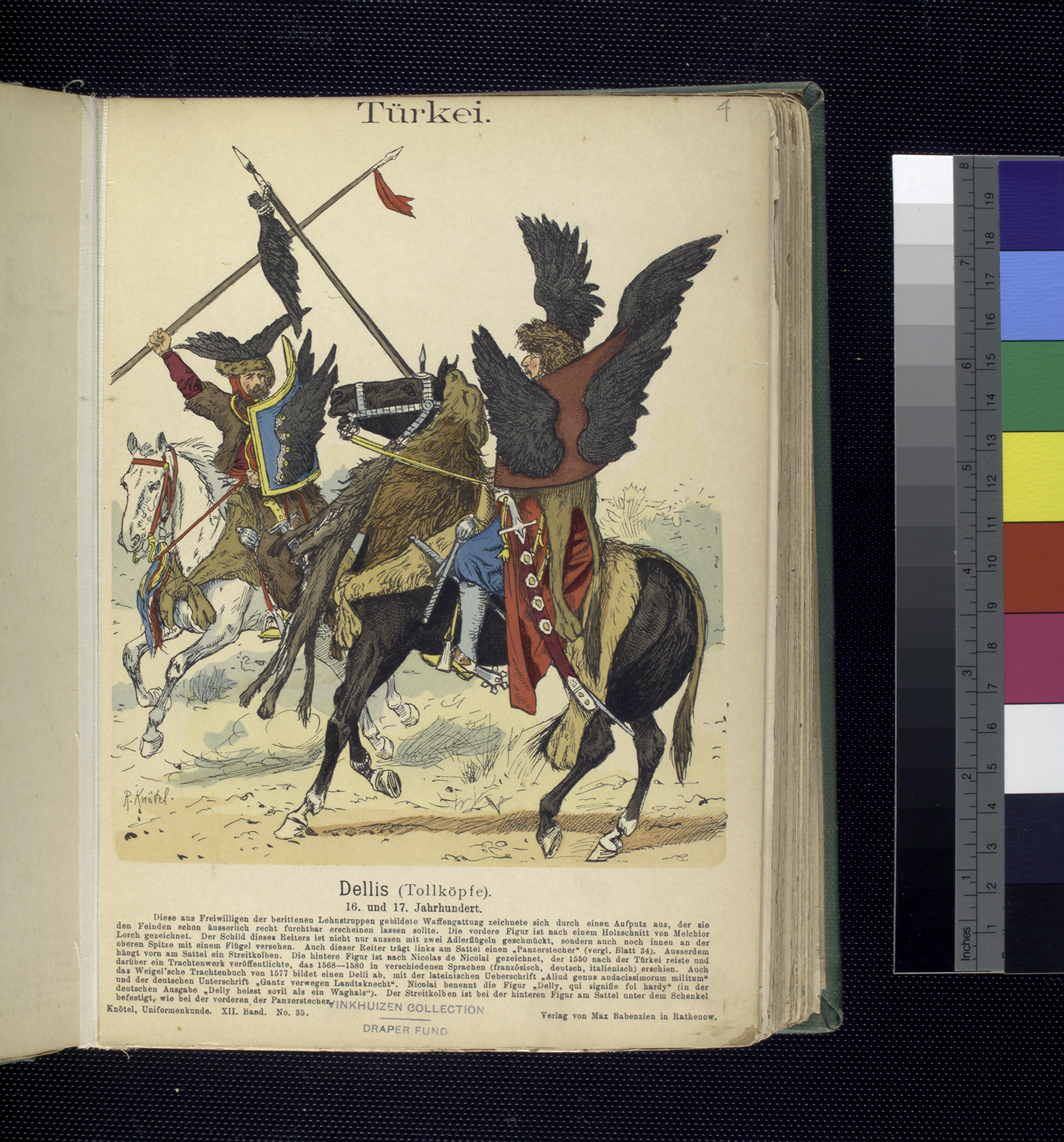
Delis

== See also ==
- Sipahi
- Akinji
- Janissaries
- Bashi-bazouk

== Sources ==
- Houtsma, Martijn Theodoor, ed. (1987). "Deli". First Encyclopedia of Islam. E.J. Brill's first encyclopedia of Islam, 1913–1936, Volume II: Bābā Fighānī–Dwīn. Leiden: BRILL. ISBN 90-04-08265-4.
- Erickson, Edward J.; Uyar, Mesut (2009). Military History of the Ottomans: From Osman to Atatürk. ABC-CLIO. ISBN 978-0313056031.
- Nicolle, David (2024-11-07). Armies of the Ottoman Empire 1775–1820. Bloomsbury Publishing. ISBN 978-1-4728-6933-3.
