= Kethüda =

Ottoman Turkish title

Kethüda (Ottoman Turkish: صدارت كتخداسی; Turkish: Sadaret Kethüdası; Persian: کدخدا), often corrupted to k[y]ahya or kehya in daily speech, was an Ottoman Turkish title meaning "steward, deputy, lieutenant". It derives from the Persian word katak-khvatai ("master of a household", later "chieftain, headman").

The term originated in medieval Persia. Under the Ilkhanids, the term kadkhuda (Persian: کدخدا) referred to a village elder who acted as its representative towards the government, and later, under the Safavids, their duties included the collection of taxes and administration of their village or town. From Persian practice it spread to the Seljuk Turks of the Sultanate of Rum, and is first attested in Ottoman usage in the 15th century in the sense of an "authorised deputy official". Accordingly, the term is found across a wide variety of official institutions and offices, both in the central and in the provincial administration, where the kethüda served as a deputy to the agha or re'is in charge of a department or unit or a provincial governor (beylerbey or sanjakbey). By far the most important among them was the deputy of the grand vizier, the sadaret kethüdası; the kethüda yeri supervised the timariots in the provinces, and was also found as a title in the Janissary corps; and the kapı kethüdası was the permanent representative maintained in the Ottoman capital, Constantinople, by provincial governors, senior viziers, or tributary and vassal rulers like the hospodars of the Danubian principalities.

At the same time, the Persian institution of kethüdas as village or town chiefs, also continued under the Ottoman Empire, until it was abolished in 1790. The system was also extended to nomadic tribes; originally, while chieftainship was hereditary, the tribe chieftain appointed kethüdas over the subordinate clans, while later the clans chose one of their own number to act in this capacity.

== Sources ==
- Orhonlu, Cengiz; Baer, G. & Ed. (1978). "Ketk̲h̲udā". In van Donzel, E.; Lewis, B.; Pellat, Ch. & Bosworth, C. E. (eds.). The Encyclopaedia of Islam, Second Edition. Volume IV: Iran–Kha. Leiden: E. J. Brill. pp. 893–894. ISBN 978-90-04-05745-6. OCLC 758278456.
