= Janků =

Janků [ˈjaŋkuː] is a gender-neutral Czech surname. It originated as a patronymic from Janek by adding the suffix '-ů', which is equivalent to the East Slavic patronymic suffix '-ov'. Notable people with the surname include:

- Hana Janků (1940–1995), Czech soprano
- Heidi Janků (1962), Czech actress
- Jan Janků (1971), Czech former high jumper
- Kateřina Janků
- Pavel Janků (1969), Czech professional ice hockey player
- Rosa Janku (1882–1944), Austrian resistance fighter during World War II
- Tomáš Janků (1974), Czech former high jumper

== See also ==
- Janku
