= Jankov =

Jankov may refer to places in the Czech Republic:

- Jankov (Benešov District), a municipality and village in the Central Bohemian Region
- Jankov (České Budějovice District), a municipality and village in the South Bohemian Region
- Jankov (Pelhřimov District), a municipality and village in the Vysočina Region
