= Yanko (name) =

Yanko (Bulgarian: Янко) is a surname and given name. It is a Bulgarian version of the Serbo-Croatian Janko, Hebrew Janka, or Belarusian Yanka. The name may refer to the following notable people:

== Given name ==
- Yanko Angelov (born 1993), Bulgarian football midfielder
- Yanko Bratanov (born 1952), Bulgarian sprinter
- Yanko Daucik (1941–2017), Slovak football player
- Yanko Georgiev (born 1988), Bulgarian football goalkeeper
- Yanko Kirilov (born 1946), Bulgarian football midfielder
- Yanko Kosturkov (born 1982), Bulgarian football player
- Yanko Radanchev (born 1957), Bulgarian gymnast
- Yanko Rusev (born 1958), Bulgarian weightlifter
- Yanko Sakazov (1860–1941), Bulgarian socialist politician
- Yanko Sandanski (born 1988), Bulgarian football midfielder
- Yanko Shopov (born 1954), Bulgarian wrestler
- Yanko Tihov (born 1977), British and Bulgarian painter and printmaker
- Yanko Valkanov (born 1982), Bulgarian football defender
- Jean "Yanko" Varda (1893–1971), Turkish-born American painter, of mixed Greek and French heritage

== Surname ==
- Arik Yanko (born 1991), Israeli association football player
- Kennedy Yanko, American artist
- Lika Yanko (1928–2001), Bulgarian artist
- Yuriy Yanko, Ukrainian music conductor

== See also ==
- Yanko (disambiguation)
