= Janek (surname) =

Janek (Czech and Slovak feminine: Janková) is a Czech, Slovak and Polish surname, derived from the given name Janek.

The Polish surname has a dialectal form, Jonek. Polish archaic feminine forms include Jankowa (after husband) and Jankówna (after father). These forms are still used colloquially.

Notable people with the surname include:

- Ivan Janek (born 1986), Slovak footballer
- Jolanta Janek (born 1963), Polish diplomat
- Kyle Janek (born 1958), American politician and medical doctor
- Martina Janková (born 1972), Czech opera singer
- Tomáš Janek (born 1983), Slovak ice hockey player
