= Janka (disambiguation) =

Janka is a given name or surname of Slavic, ultimately Hebrew origin.

Janka may also refer to:

- Janka, Contai, settlement in Contai subdivision, West Bengal, India
- Janka (Tampere), a suburb in Tampere, Finland
- Janka hardness test, test for wood
- Janka, original name of Janna (TV series), a German-Polish children's television series

== See also ==
- Yanka (disambiguation)
