= Jankov (České Budějovice District) =

- Municipality
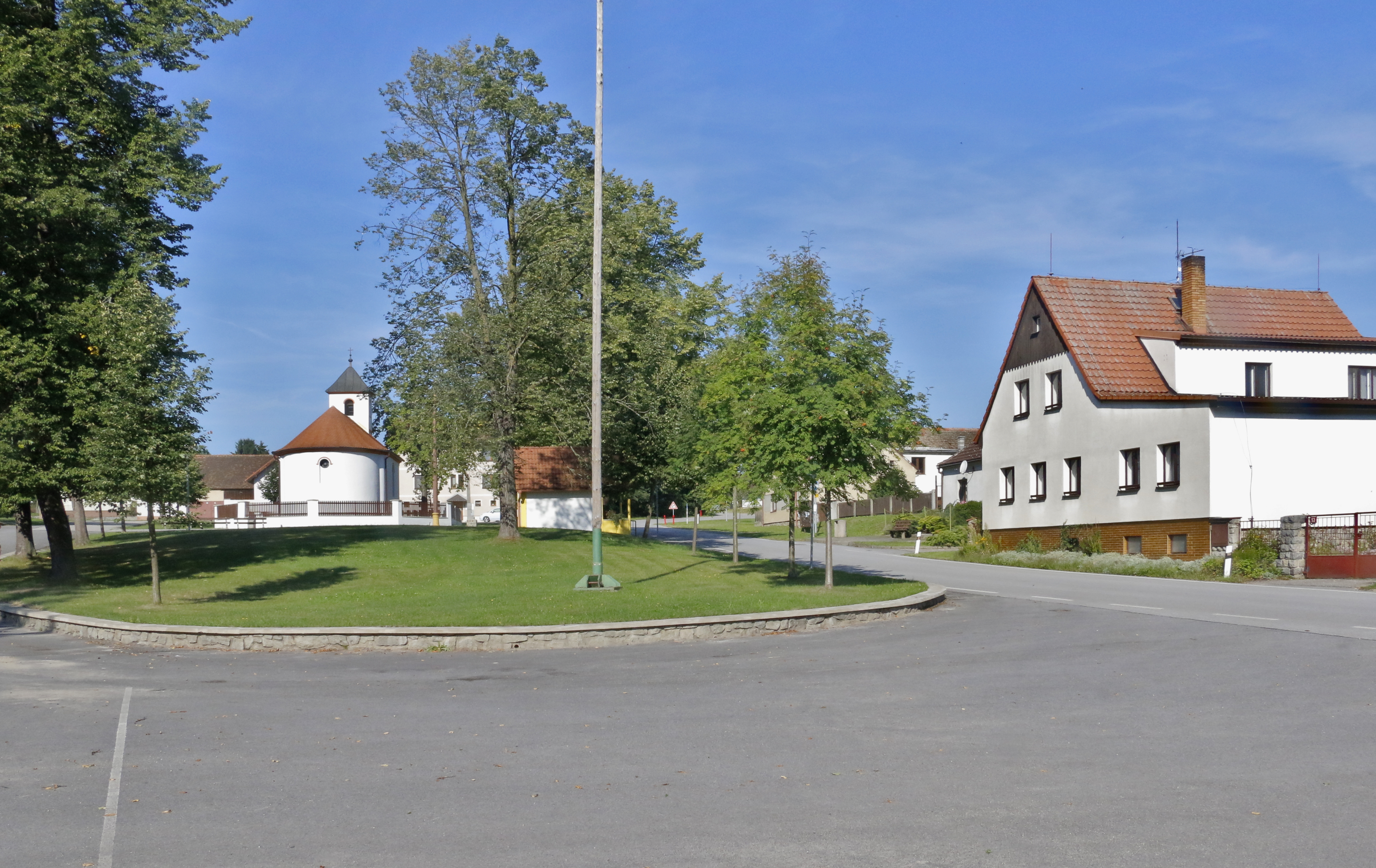
- Centre of Jankov

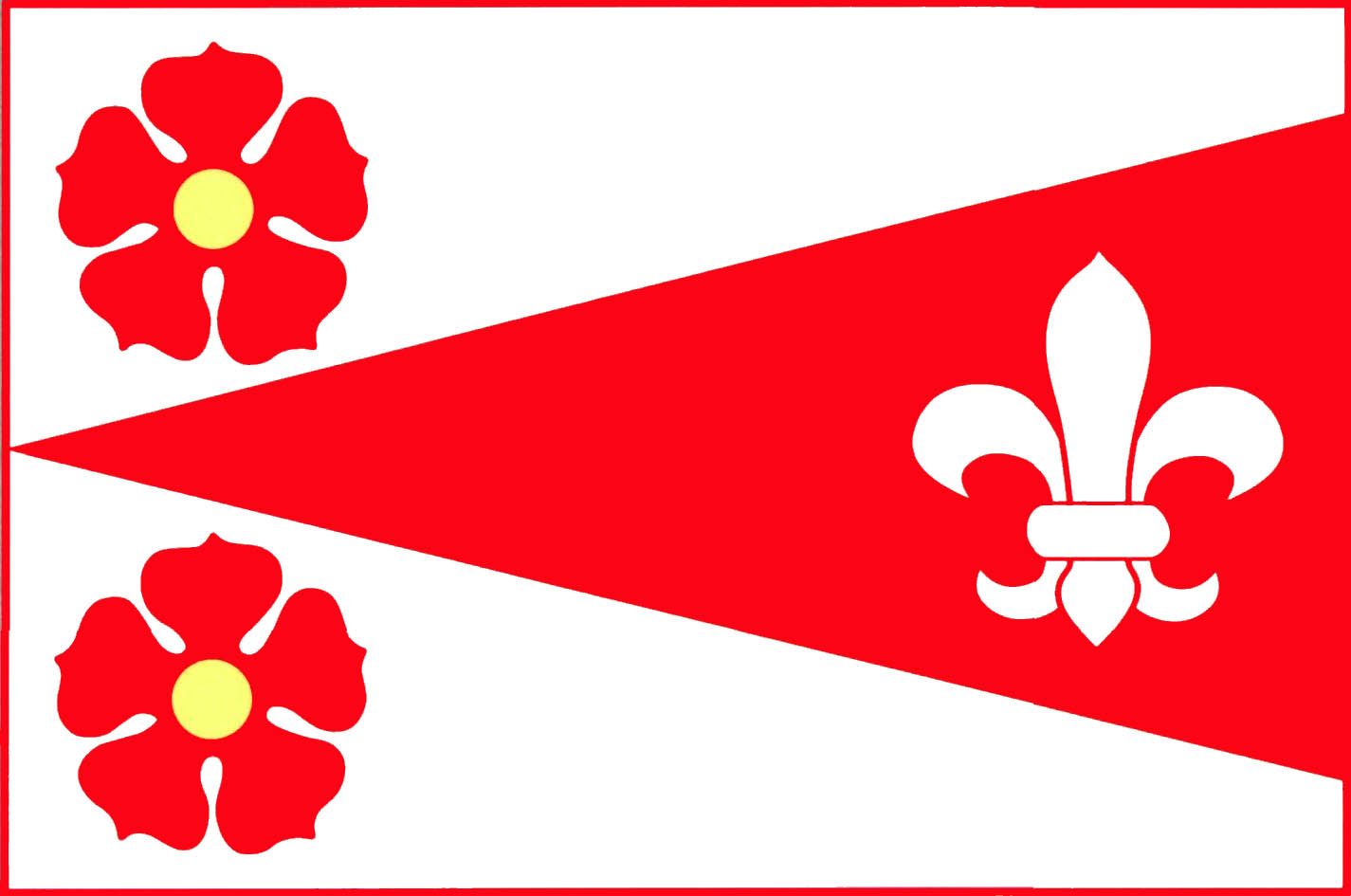
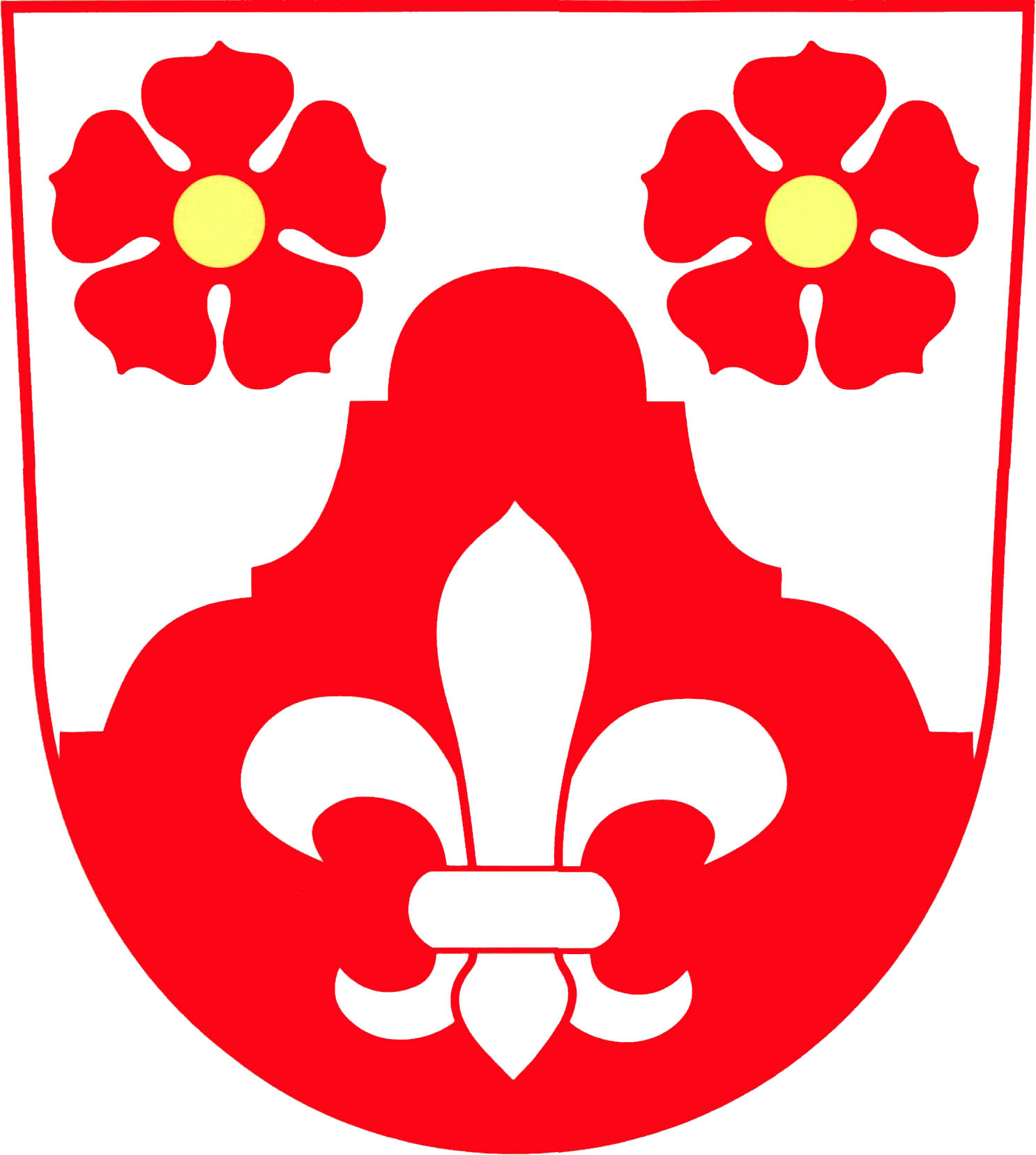
- Flag Coat of arms

- Location in the Czech Republic
- Coordinates: 48°57′59″N 14°17′52″E
- Country: Czech Republic
- Region: South Bohemian
- District: České Budějovice
- First mentioned: 1379

Area
  - Total: 12.08 km^{2} (4.66 sq mi)
- Elevation: 488 m (1,601 ft)

Population (2026-01-01)
  - Total: 391
  - Density: 32.4/km^{2} (83.8/sq mi)
- Time zone: UTC+1 (CET)
  - Summer (DST): UTC+2 (CEST)
- Postal code: 373 84
- Website: www.jankovcb.cz

UNESCO World Heritage Site
- Official name: Holašovice Historic Village
- Criteria: ii, iv
- Reference: 861
- Inscription: 1998 (22nd Session)

Jankov is a municipality and village in České Budějovice District in the South Bohemian Region of the Czech Republic. It has about 400 inhabitants. The village of Holašovice within the municipality is protected as a UNESCO World Heritage Site.

== Administrative division ==
Jankov consists of two municipal parts (in brackets population according to the 2021 census):

- Jankov (173)
- Holašovice (204)

== Etymology ==
The name is derived from the personal name Janek), meaning "Janek's (court)".

== Geography ==
Jankov is located about 12 kilometres (7 mi) west of České Budějovice. It lies in the Bohemian Forest Foothills. The highest point is the Švelhán hill at 722 m (2,369 ft) above sea level. There are several fishponds in the northern part of the municipal territory. Most of the municipality lies within the Blanský les Protected Landscape Area.

== History ==
The first written mention of Jankov is from 1379. Until 1850, it belonged to the Český Krumlov estate and shared its owners. Until the end of World War II, Jankov was ethnically Czech village and Holašovice was a German village; however, after the war, the German-speaking population was expelled. From 1850 to 1956, Jankov was a municipal part of Čakov. Since 1957, it has been a separate municipality. Holašovice was a municipal part of Záboří until 1964, when it was annexed to Jankov.

== Demographics ==
Historical population

Year	Pop.	±%
1869	505	—
1880	514	+1.8%
1890	485	−5.6%
1900	474	−2.3%
1910	465	−1.9%

Year	Pop.	±%
1921	517	+11.2%
1930	494	−4.4%
1950	347	−29.8%
1961	379	+9.2%
1970	349	−7.9%

Year	Pop.	±%
1980	362	+3.7%
1991	356	−1.7%
2001	369	+3.7%
2011	380	+3.0%
2021	377	−0.8%

Source: Censuses

== Transport ==
There are no railways or major roads passing through the municipality.

== Sights ==
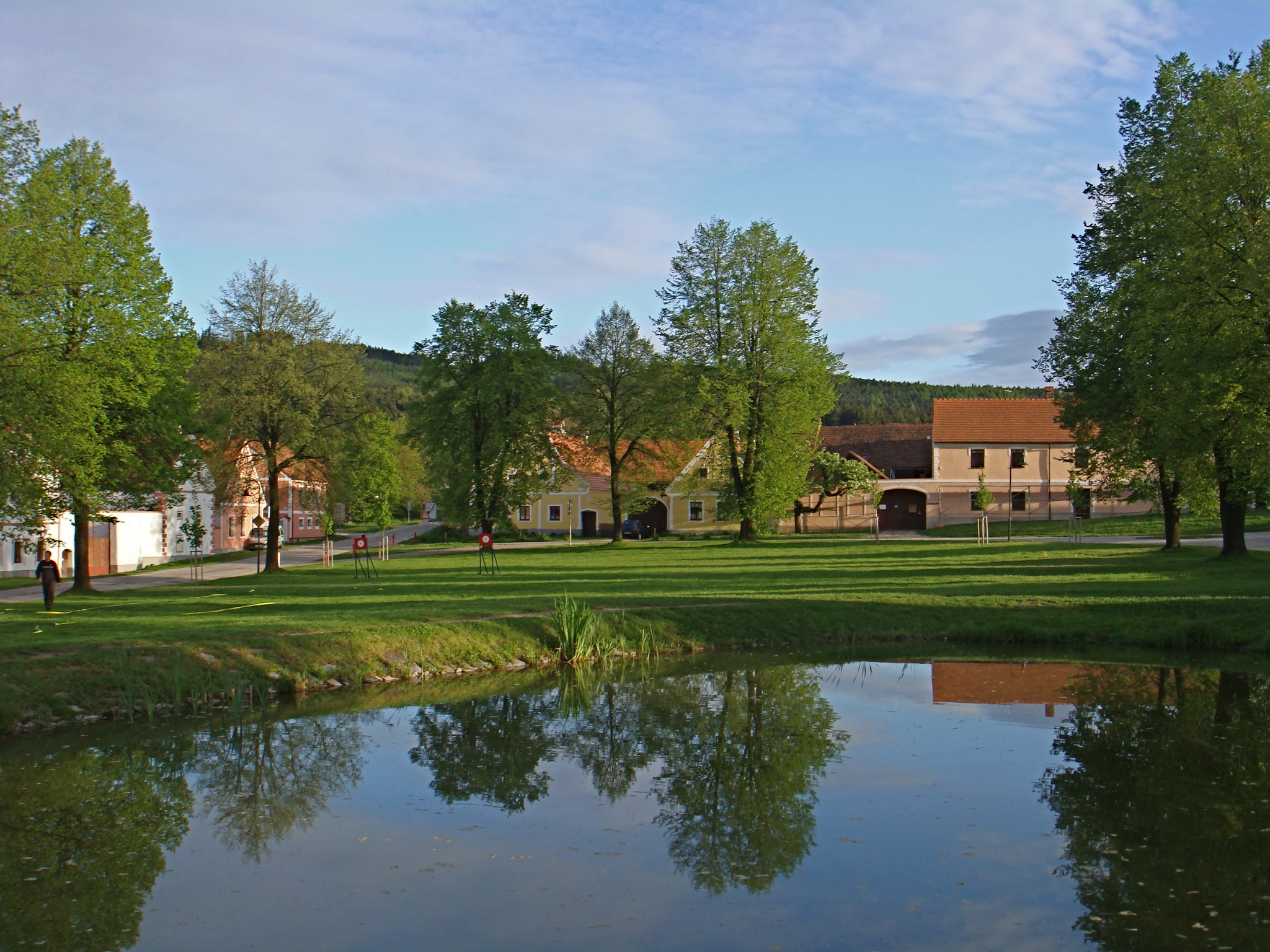
The village of Holašovice

Holašovice is a small historic village, since 1998 designated as a UNESCO World Heritage Site because of its exceptional preservation of a traditional Baroque-era village.

The main landmark of Jankov is the Chapel of Saint Vitus. It dates from 1882 and is decorated with folk Baroque elements.
