= The Fifth Corner =

- Genre: Mystery
- Created by: John Herzfeld
- Written by: Bryce Zabel
- Starring: Alex McArthur; J. E. Freeman; Kim Delaney; Anthony Valentine; James Coburn
- Composer: David Michael Frank
- Country of origin: United States
- Original language: English
- No. of seasons: 1
- No. of episodes: 6 (3 unaired)

Production
- Running time: 60 minutes
- Production companies: John Herzfeld Productions; Adelson-Baumgarten Productions; TriStar Television

Original release
- Network: NBC
- Release: April 17 – April 24, 1992

The Fifth Corner is an American television series which aired on NBC and produced by TriStar Television in 1992. The two-hour pilot aired on April 17, 1992, and one final episode aired the week after.

== Series overview ==
Richard Braun (McArthur) is a man who wakes up one day with absolutely no recollection of who he is. It's a bad time for him to suffer from amnesia, as he also discovers to his horror he wakes up next to a dead woman in bed.

Aided by his sidekick/driver Boone (Freeman), Braun sets out to try to discover his real identity. He returns home to find items such as designer clothes, weapons, fake IDs and passports, which leads him to believe that he is a deep-undercover spy. He also learns a little bit about his likes and dislikes. There are also some bad guys led by Dr. Grandwell (Coburn) who would like to know about his past and real identity. During this process, a reporter named Erica Fontaine (Delaney) also sets out to find out more about who Braun is.

== Cast ==
- Alex McArthur as Richard Braun
- J. E. Freeman as Boone
- Julia Nickson-Soul as
- James Coburn as Dr. Grandwell
- Kim Delaney as Erica Fontaine
- Anthony Valentine as The Hat

== Episodes ==
No.	Title	Directed by	Written by	Original release date
1–2	"Trio"	John Herzfeld	John Herzfeld	April 17, 1992
A man who lost his memory finds himself tied to the murder of a woman and a larger conspiracy. He discovers he has many names, one of which is the nickname Fifth Corner. A beautiful redhead named Erica is on his trail. Everyone wants his mysterious diary (a laptop with details of all his assignments). His evil boss Grandwell wants him back working for The Corporation, which disappoints Fifth Corner's rival The Hat who wants him dead. Guest star: Sergio Calderón
3	"Eva"	Albert Pyun	John Herzfeld	April 24, 1992
Fifth Corner (aka “George”) search for his wife Eva is interrupted when he is arrested as Jack Previn for the murder of a Japanese electronic genius. He is about to be extradited to Japan when the blonde who works for The Hat arrives and post bail. The new name is Jack Previn and the mystery is the death of a Japanese inventor and his missing amazing electronic gadget. The arc story of Fifth Corner's search for his identity and Erica's obsession about bringing down Grandwell continue as the series primary focus. Guest stars: Peter Kwong & Tim Thomerson
4	"Home"	Sam Pillsbury	John Herzfeld & Bryce Zabel	UNAIRED
While Fifth Corner continues to search for his identity Grandwell has erased all evidence of Erica's existence. Fifth Corner may have found his family and his name, John Avlean. The mob is moving in on John's big brother's restaurant. When the Fifth Corner and Boone take on the mob, things go wrong. This week's name is John Avlean and the mystery deals with the mob's attempt to take over John's big brother's restaurant. Guest stars: Barbara Barrie & Chris Allport
5	"Woman at Her Toilette"	Gabrielle Beaumont	Leslie Bohem & John Herzfeld	UNAIRED
Grandwell wants the painting he had Anthony Parachini (Fifth Corner) steal for him. Fifth Corner can’t remember where the painting is, but finds yet another identity, Jean Michel, that leads him to it. To complicate things, a hit squad arrives to kill Grandwell, and Anthony and get the painting. To save Erica and get her life back, Fifth Corner makes a deal with Grandwell. Two new names are featured, Anthony who worked for Grandwell and Jean who led a secret life from Grandwell. The mystery is where is the painting. Guest stars: Marina Sirtis and Frank Stallone
6	"Sword of Damocles"	John Herzfeld	John Herzfeld	UNAIRED
Fifth Corner had agreed never see Erica again if Grandwell restores her identity. When Erica learns of the deal, she rejects it, even if it means she will be killed. Grandwell remains in his forgiving mood in regard to Fifth Corner, but The Hat finally convinces Grandwell to let him kill Fifth Corner. Grandwell expects and hopes The Hat will fail. The last episode spares us a new name or mystery as we rush towards the resolution of Grandwell and Fifth Corner arc story. The series ends with many of the questions unanswered including the real name of Fifth Corner. Guest stars: Paul Cain and Tianna Thorpe

== TV ratings ==
- Ep 1: 8.5 household rating (Competition: Janek: Murder Times Seven (Repeat) [7.7 rating])
- Ep 2: 7 rating (lead in I'll Fly Away garnered an 8 rating at 9pm)
  - Competition: 20/20 [14.4 rating]; Burt Reynolds Special (Repeat) [7.9]

== Similar series ==
- Coronet Blue (CBS, 1967)
- John Doe on FOX
