= Janek (given name) =

Masculine given name

Janek is a Polish and Czech masculine given name. In Czech, it originated as a diminutive of Jan. Notable people with the name include:

- Janek Ambros (born 1988), American-Polish filmmaker
- Janek Gwizdala (born 1978), English jazz bassist and record producer
- Janek Juzek, better known as John Juzek (1892 – c. 1965), Czech merchant
- Janek Kiisman (born 1972), Estonian footballer
- Janek Ledecký (born 1962), Czech singer, songwriter, guitarist and composer
- Janek Mäggi (born 1973), Estonian politician, television presenter and writer
- Janek Meet (born 1974), Estonian footballer
- Janek Mela (born 1988), Polish explorer, youngest person to reach the North Pole
- Janek Õiglane (born 1994), Estonian decathlete
- Janek Pawel Pietrzak (1984–2008), United States Marine Corps Sergeant
- Janek Schaefer (born 1970), English sound artist, composer and entertainer
- Janek Ratnatunga, Sri Lankan-Australian academic
- Janek Roos (born 1974), Danish badminton player
- Janek Rubeš (born 1987), Czech reporter, documentarist and director
- Janek Sarapson (1972–2026), Estonian actor
- Janek Schaefer (born 1970), British sound artist
- Janek Sirrs (born 1965), visual effects artist
- Janek Sternberg (born 1992), German footballer
- Janek Tombak (born 1976), Estonian road bicycle racer

== See also ==
- Zbyszek Godlewski (1952–1970), known under the fictional name Janek Wiśniewski in the poem Ballad of Janek Wiśniewski
- Janka
- Jonek
