= Janku =

Janku is a surname. Notable people with the surname include:

- Mikel Janku (1941–2019), Albanian footballer
- Rosa Janku (1882–1944), Austrian seamstress and resistance fighter during World War II
- Stivian Janku (born 1997), international footballer of Albanian descent

== See also ==
- Janků, a Czech surname
