= Janko Mihailović Moler =

Serbian priest and artist

Janko Mihailović Moler (Serbian Cyrillic: Јанко Михаиловић Молер; 1792 - 1853) was a Serbian priest and artist. He was an icon and portrait painter.

== Biography ==
Mihailović Moler was born in Negrišori, at the time in the Ottoman Empire.

He is known for painting the icons of the iconostasis of the Serbian Orthodox Church in the Ježevica Monastery, the Orthodox church in Guča, the church of Žiča monastery, the monastery and the wooden church of Dobroselica, on the Zlatibor mountains. He also painted the iconostasis in the church in the village Prilipac near Požega.

With his son Sreten Protić, he painted the iconostasis of the Church of the Holy Trinity in the village of Bjeluša, near Arilje, in 1831, and the Church of St. John the Baptist in Gorobilje.

He also did the portrait of Nikifor Maksimović, the founder of the Sretenje monastery near Čačak.

He is also credited with the coat of arms of the Obrenović dynasty, which adorns the façade of Jovan Obrenović's konak in Čačak.

He died in Negrišori, at the time in the Principality of Serbia.

== Gallery ==
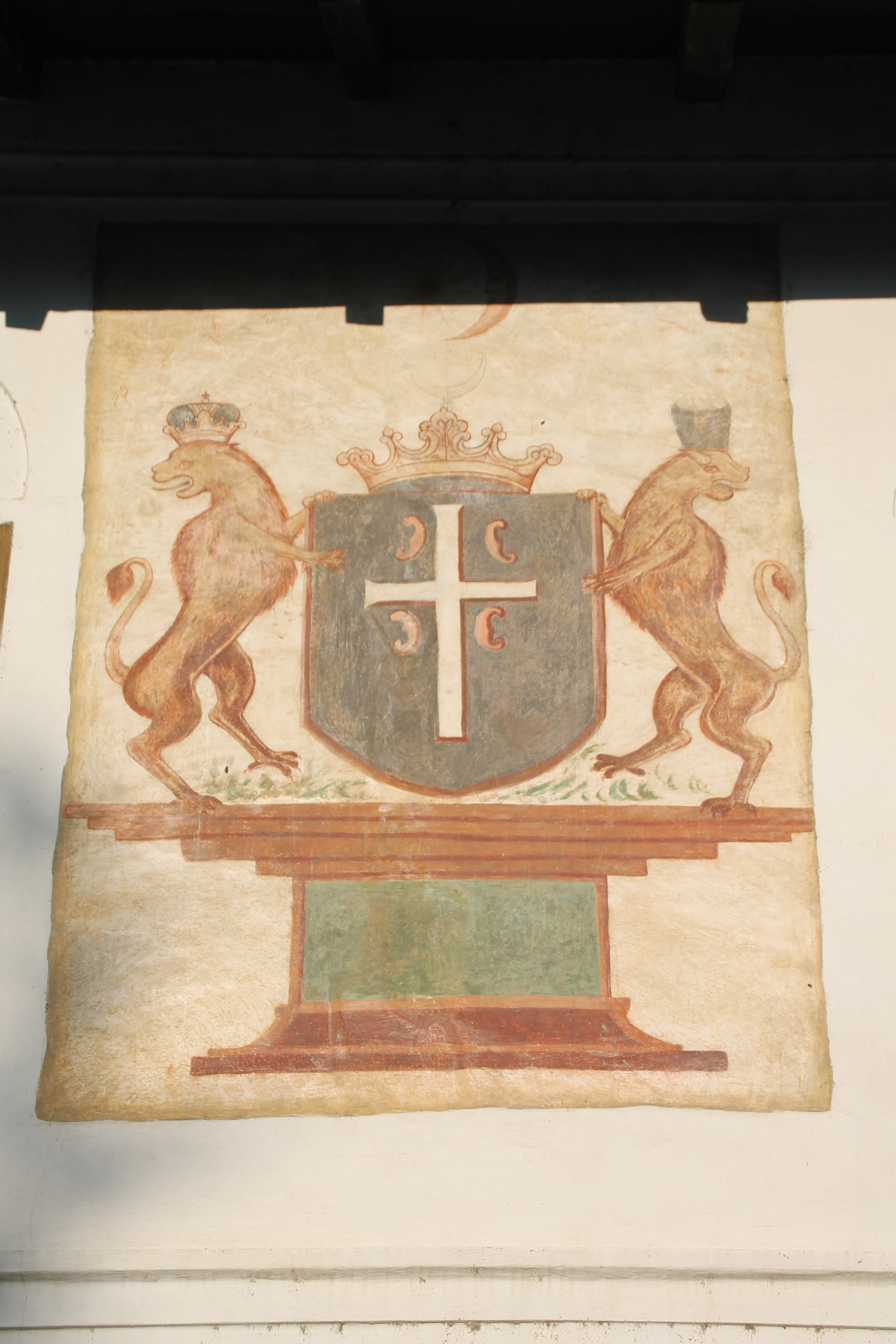
Coat of arms of the Obrenović dynasty

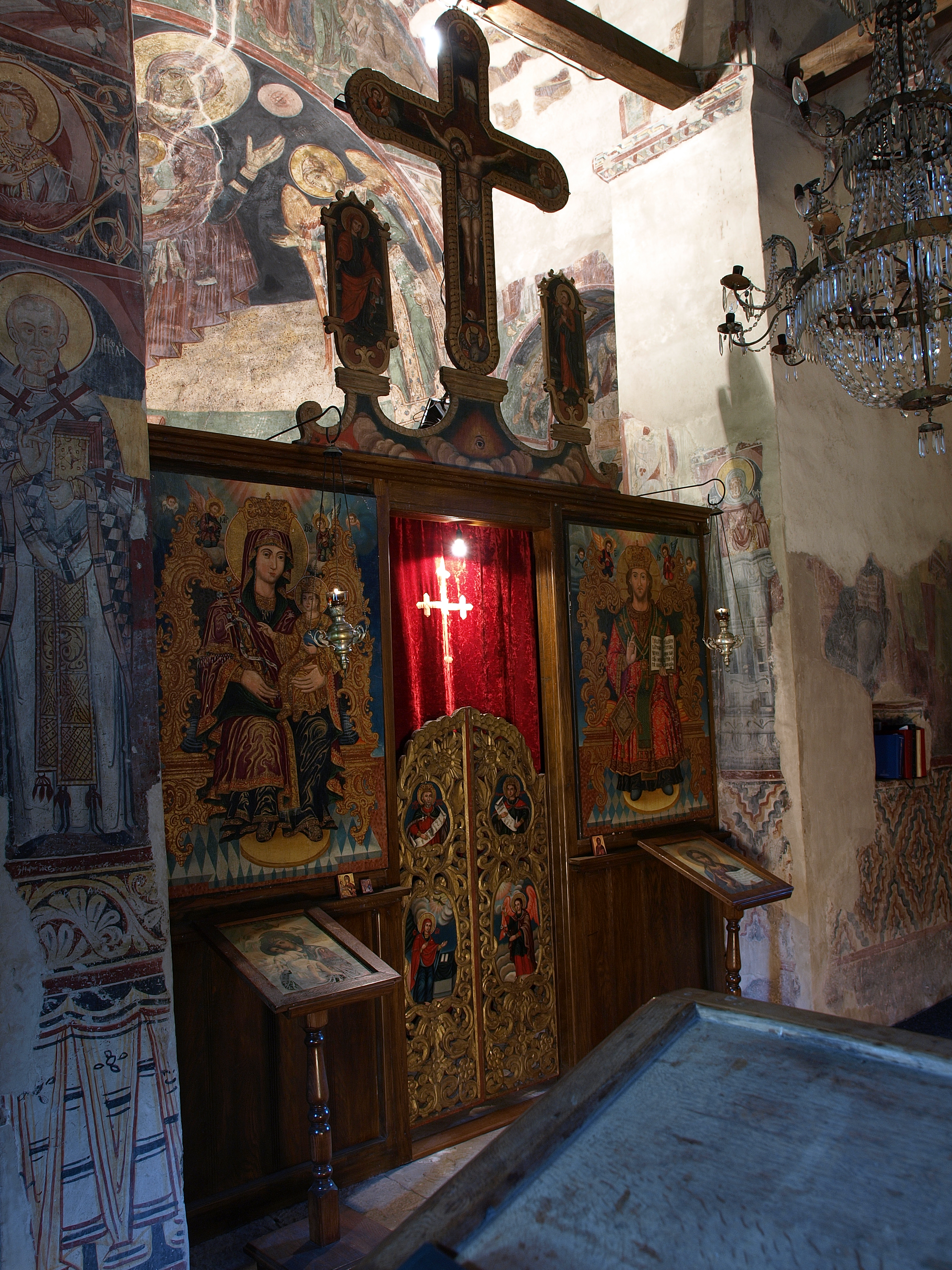
Iconostasis in Ježevica Monastery

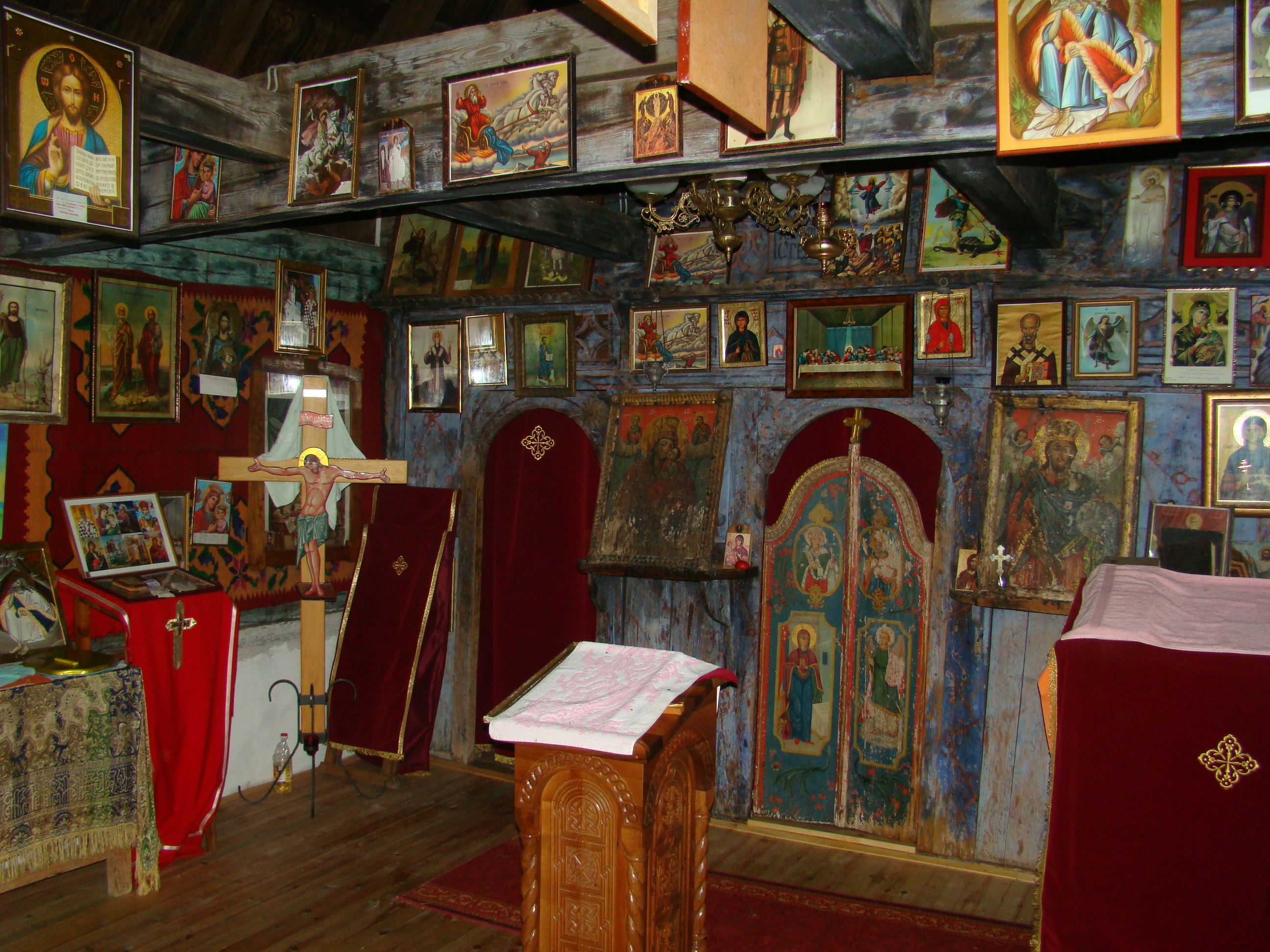
Iconostasis in the wooden church of Dobroselica

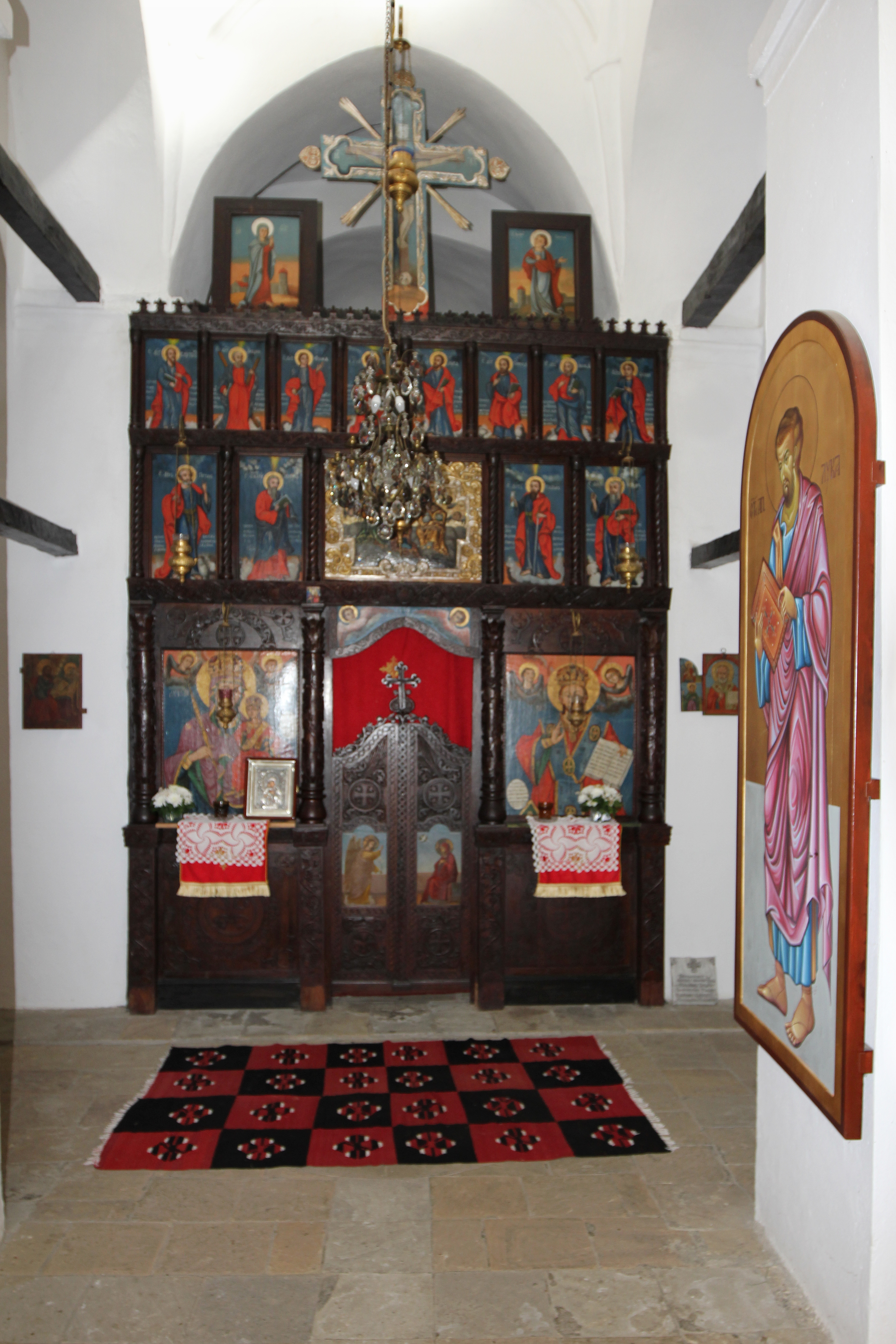
Iconostasis in church of Prilipac

== See also ==
- List of painters from Serbia
- Serbian art
