= Yanko =

Yanko may refer to:

- Yanko (name)
- Yanko Shire, a defunct local government area in New South Wales, Australia
- Parish of Yanko in New South Wales, Australia
