= Holašovice =

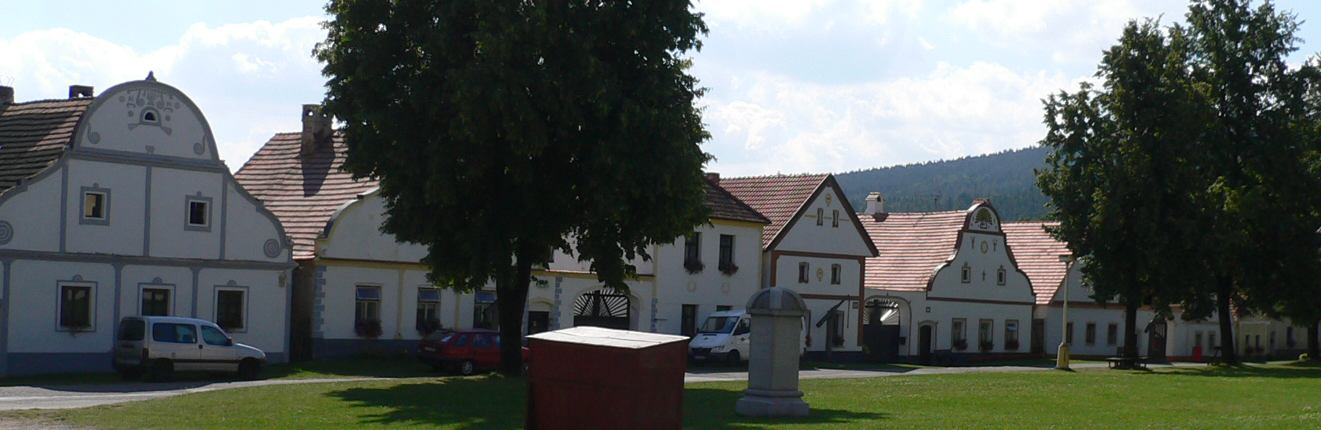
- Houses in Holašovice

- Flag Coat of arms

- Location within Czech Republic
- Coordinates: 48°58′10″N 14°16′22″E
- Country: Czech Republic
- Region: South Bohemian
- District: České Budějovice
- Municipality: Jankov

Population (2011)
  - Total: 147

UNESCO World Heritage Site
- Official name: Holašovice Historical Village
- Type: Cultural
- Criteria: ii, iv
- Designated: 1998 (22nd session)
- Reference no.: 861
- Region: Europe and North America

Holašovice ([ˈɦolaʃovɪtsɛ], German: Hollschowitz or Holschowitz) is a small historic village located in the south of the Czech Republic, 16 kilometres west of České Budějovice. Village belongs to the municipality Jankov. To the south lies the protected landscape area of Blanský Forest. The village was deserted after the Second World War, allowing its medieval plan and vernacular buildings in the South Bohemian Folk or Rural Baroque style to remain intact. It was restored and repopulated from 1990, and it was designated as a UNESCO World Heritage Site in 1998 because of its exceptional preservation of a traditional Baroque-era village.

== History ==
Holašovice is first mentioned in 1263. In 1292, King Wenceslaus II gave the village and several others to the Cistercian monastery of Vyšší Brod. It remained the property of the monastery until 1848.

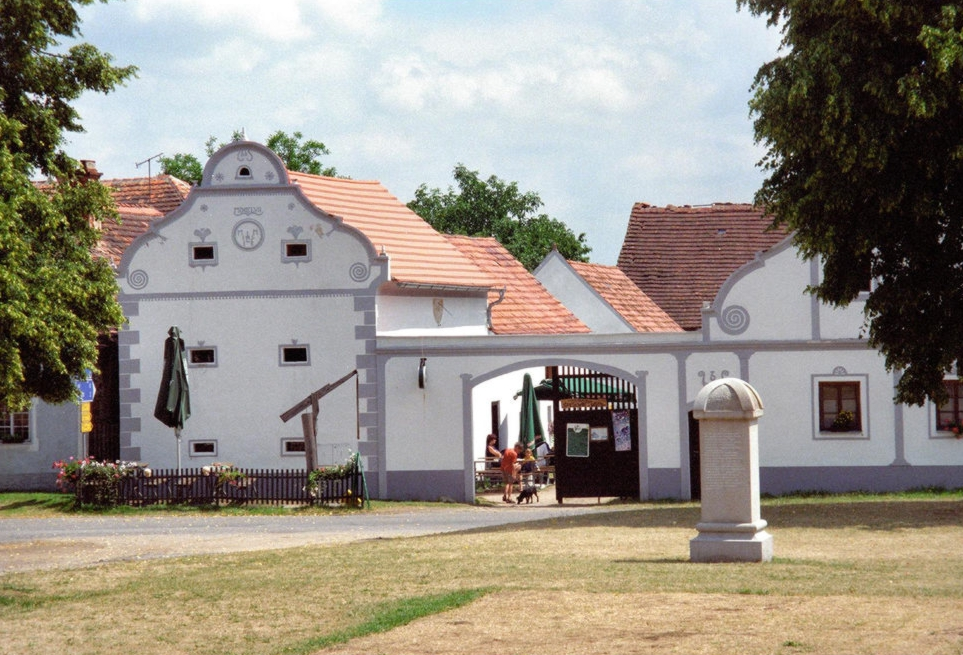

Between 1520 and 1525, Holašovice was nearly wiped out by the bubonic plague. Only two of its inhabitants survived. A column erected over the plague grave at the north end of the village commemorates this event. The monastery gradually repopulated the village with settlers from Bavaria and Austria. By 1530, the population had risen to 17, according to the monastery's records, and it had become a mainly German-speaking enclave within the Czech language area. By 1900, there were 163 inhabitants of German ethnic origin and 1 of Czech ethnic origin.

After the displacement of German residents at the end of the Second World War, many farms in the village were deserted and fell into disrepair. Holašovice became a desolate and abandoned place under the Czech post-war Communist regime.

From 1990, the village was lavishly restored and inhabited once more. It now has a population of around 140.

== Buildings and architecture ==
Holašovice is a typical Bohemian village for the Hlubocká Blata area around České Budějovice. It consists of 23 brick farmsteads containing 120 buildings, with a fish pond, a forge, and chapel. The farms were constructed in the South Bohemian Folk Baroque style, in "U" shapes with farmyard in the middle and with their stucco gable ends facing a central broad village green. The buildings date from the 18th to 20th century, with most of them built in the second half of the 19th century. The chapel of St. John of Nepomuk in the village green was built in 1755.

== Gallery ==
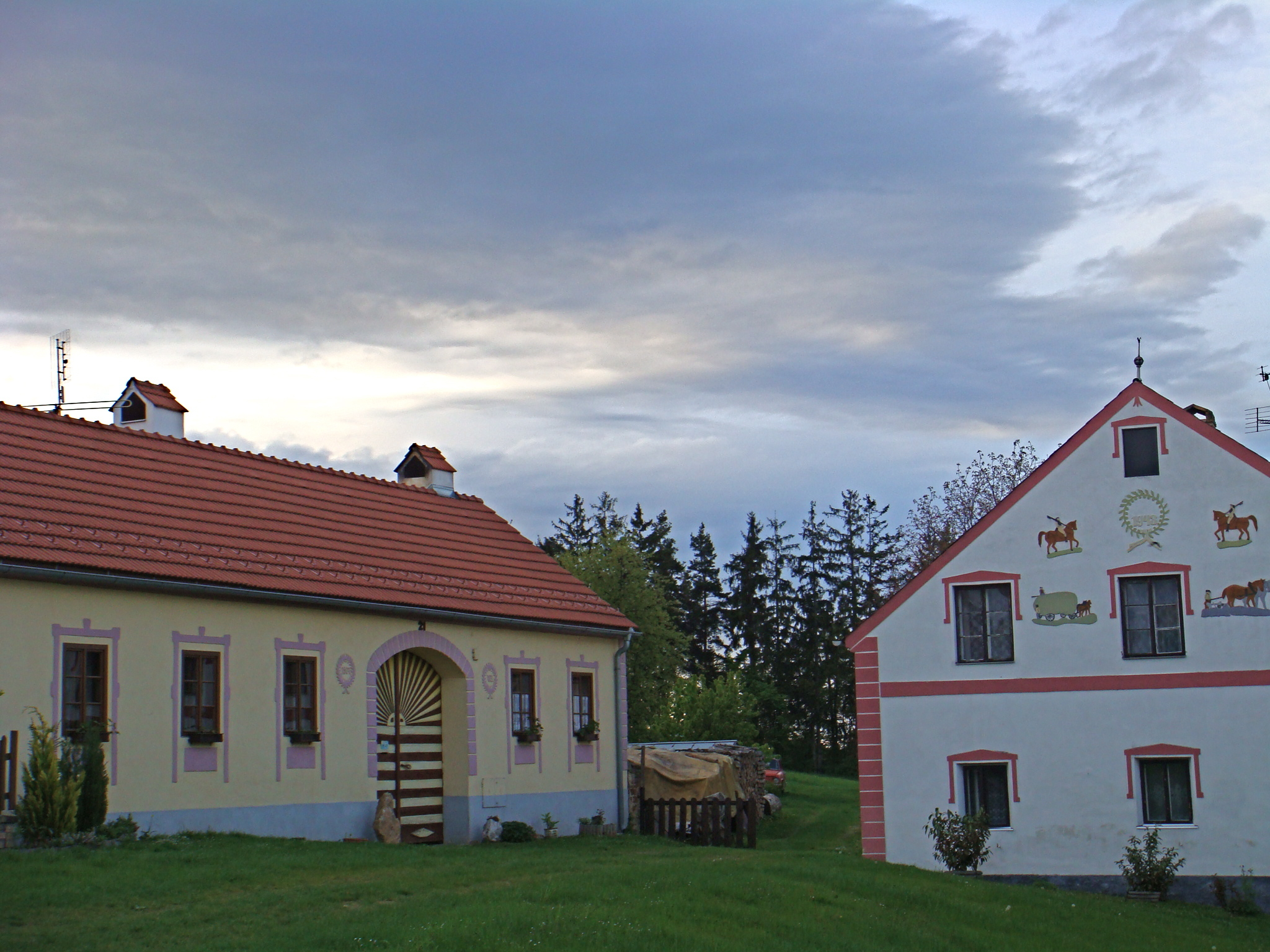
Village with door

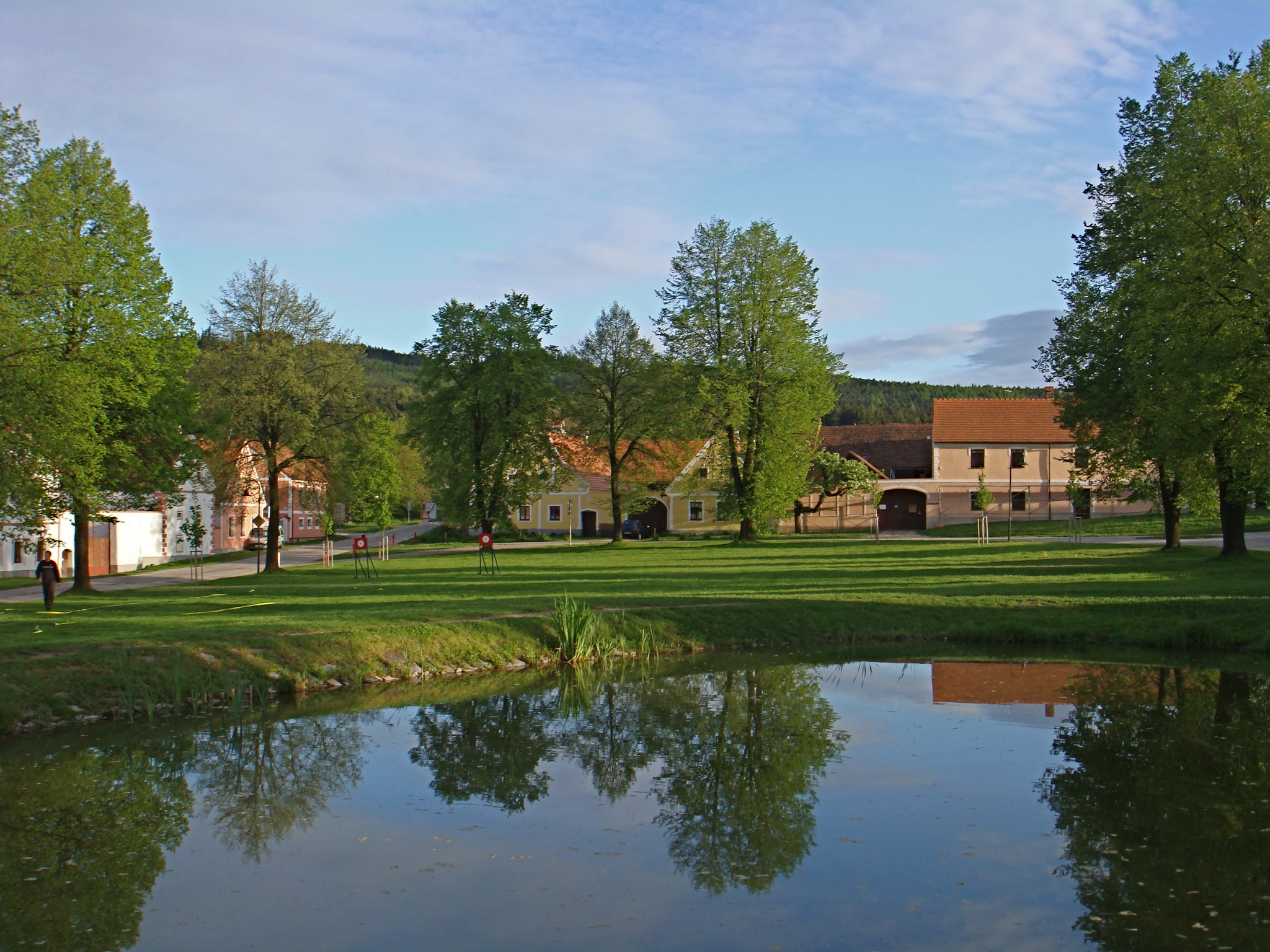
Village with stream

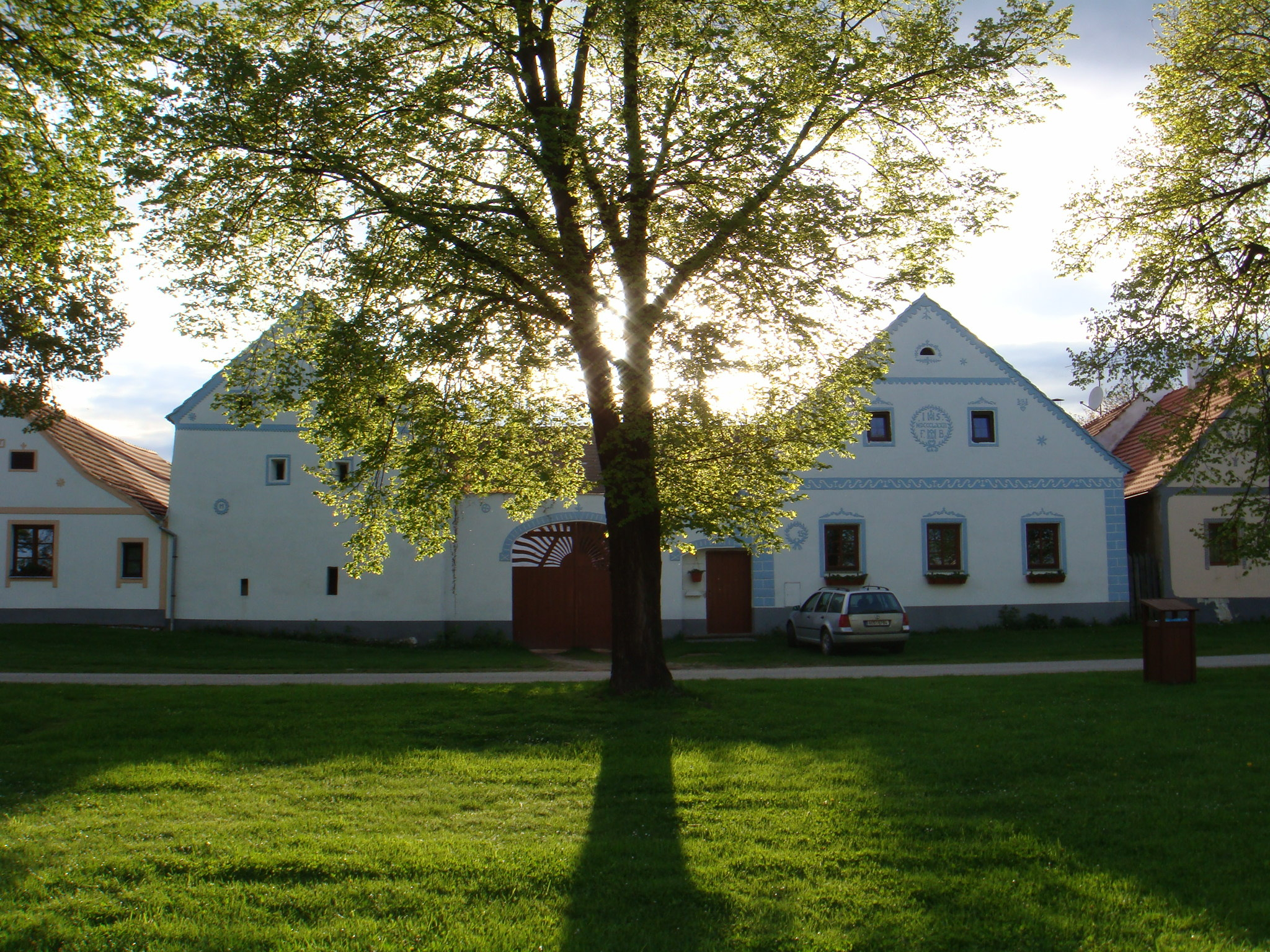
Village with tree

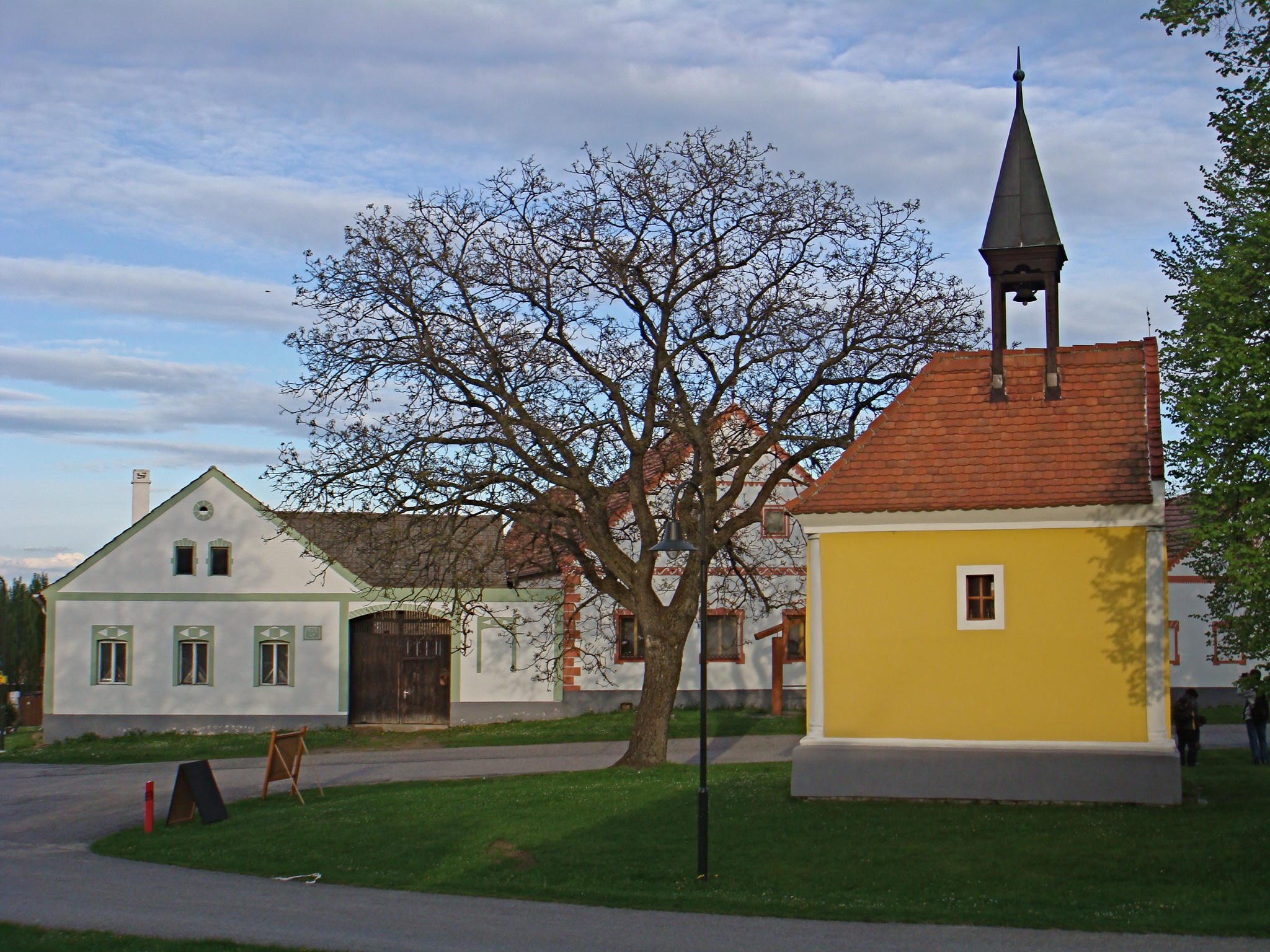
View of bell steeple

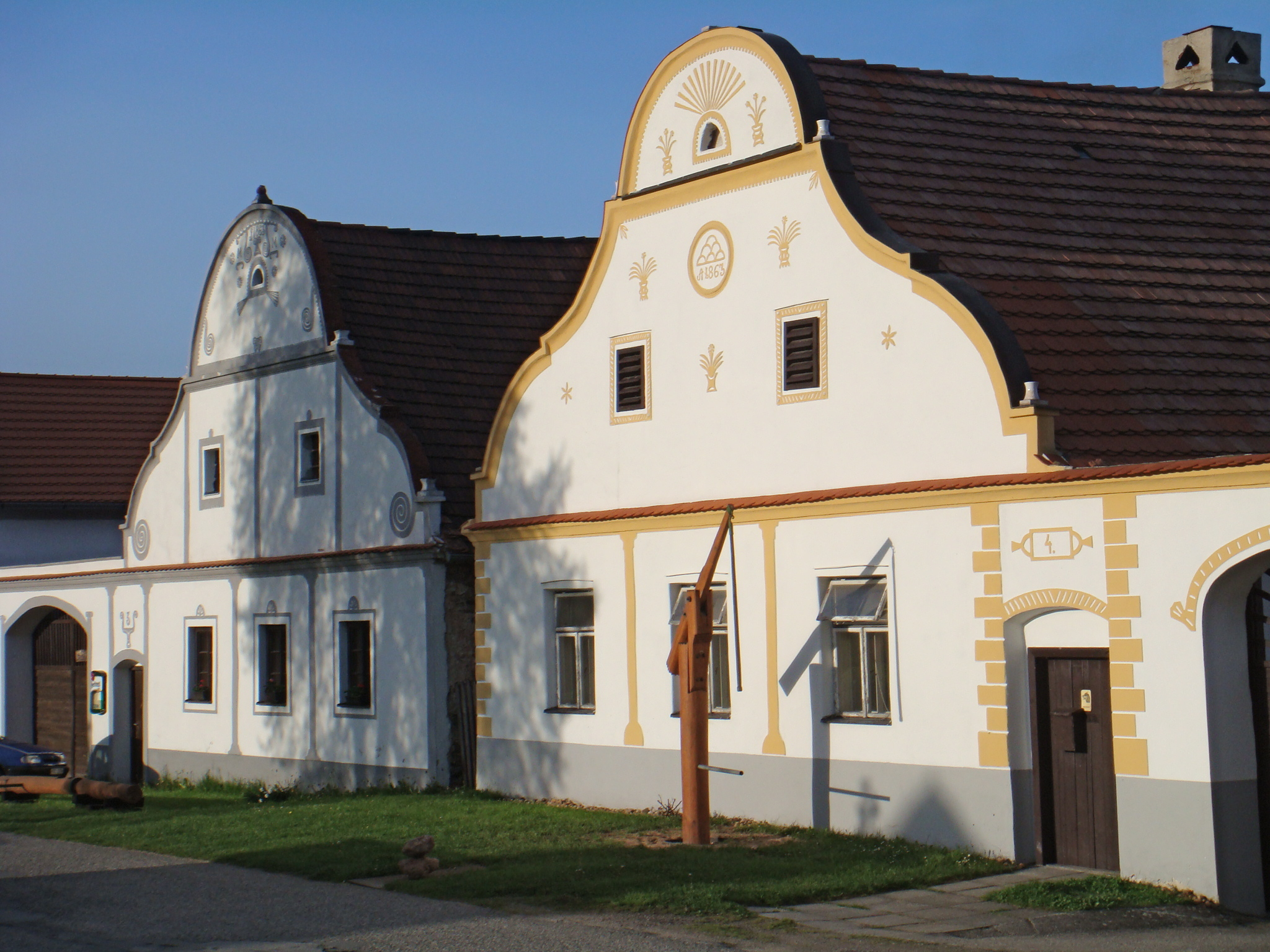
Village with facades
