= Janek =

Janek may refer to:

- Janek (given name), Estonian, Polish and Czech given name
- Janek (surname), derived from the given name
- Janek (opera), a Polish-language opera
