= Janko =

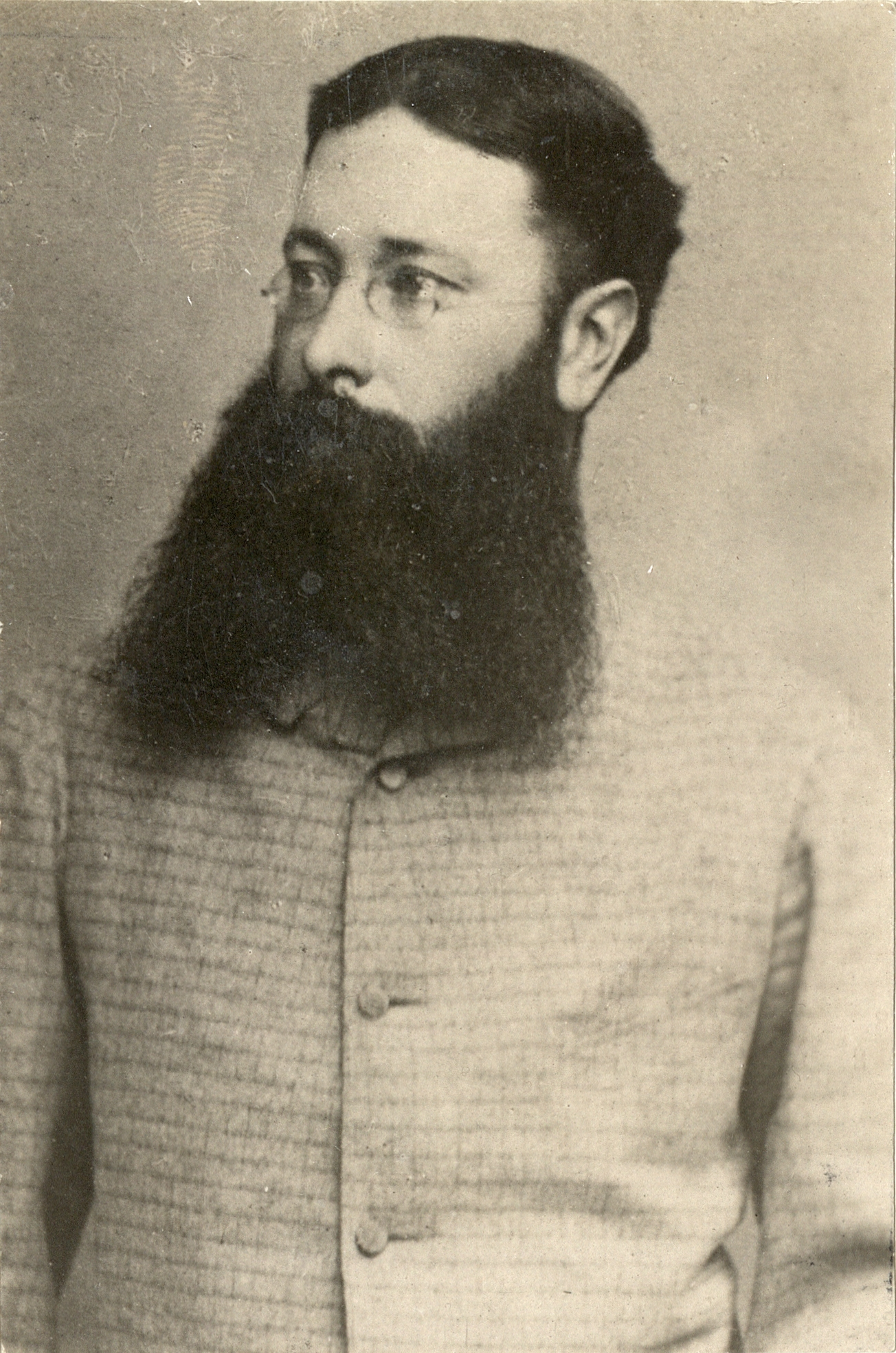
Janko Kersnik was named Janko

Janko is a name that derives from a diminutive form of the name Jan (Slavic languages), Janez (Slovenian), Janko (Macedonian), János (Hungarian), and Yakov/Jacob (Ashkenazi Jewish). It also derives from the vernacular form of Latin Johannes. Notable people with the name include:

== Given name ==
- Janko Benša (born 1977), Serbian distance runner
- Janko Bobetko (1919–2003), Croatian general
- Janko Brašić (1906–1994), Serbian naïve painter
- Janko Drašković (1770–1856), Croatian politician
- Janko Dreyer (born 1994), South African cricketer
- Janko Gagić (died 1804), Serbian hajduk leader
- Janko Gojković (born 1973), Bosnian swimmer
- Janko Gredelj (1916–1941), Yugoslav communist
- Janko Halkozović (fl. 1757), Serbian painter
- Janko Janša (1900–?), Slovenian cross-country skier
- Janko Jesenský (1874–1945), Slovak lower nobleman and member of the Slovak national movement
- Janko Kamauf (1801–1874), city magistrate of Gradec and mayor of Zagreb, Croatia
- Janko Kersnik (1852–1897), Slovene writer and politician
- Janko Kobentar (born 1940), Slovenian cross-country skier
- Janko Konstantinov (1926–2010), Macedonian architect and artist
- Janko Kos (born 1931), Slovenian literary historian
- Janko Lavrin (1887–1986), Slovene novelist, poet, critic, translator, and historian
- Janko Leskovar (1861–1949), Croatian novelist
- Janko Lukovski (1946–2023), Macedonian basketball player and coach
- Janko Mavrović (born 1977), Croatian team handball player
- Janko Mežik (1921–1998), Slovenian ski jumper
- Janko Mihailović Moler (1792–1853), Serbian priest and artist
- Janko Neuber (born 1971), German cross-country skier
- Janko Nilović (born 1941), pianist, arranger, and composer
- Janko Orožen (1891–1989), Slovene historian and schoolteacher
- Janko Pacar (born 1990), Swiss footballer
- Janko Pleterski (1923–2018), Slovenian historian, politician, and diplomat
- Janko Popović Volarić (born 1980), Croatian actor
- Janko Premrl (1920–1943), Slovene Partisan
- Janko Prunk (born 1942), Slovenian historian
- Janko Sanković (fl. 1963–1978), Yugoslavian football goalkeeper
- Janko Simović (born 1986), Montenegrin footballer
- Janko Smole (1921–2010), Slovenian politician
- Janko Tipsarević (born 1984), Serbian tennis player
- Janko Tumbasević (born 1985), Montenegrin footballer
- Janko Veber (born 1960), Slovenian politician
- Janko Veselinović (lawyer) (born 1965), Serbian academic and politician
- Janko Veselinović (writer) (1862–1905), Serbian writer
- Janko Vranyczany-Dobrinović (1920–2015), Croatian politician and diplomat
- Janko Vukotić (1866–1927), Montenegrin general
- Janko Vuković (1871–1918), Croatian admiral
- Janko Vučinić (1966–2019), Montenegrin professional boxer and politician
- Janko Šimrak (1883–1946), Croatian Greek Catholic hierarch
- Janko Štefe (1923–?), Slovenian alpine skier

== Surname ==
- Anna Janko (born 1957), Polish poet, writer, columnist and literary critic
- Eva Janko (born 1945), Austrian javelin thrower
- Lubomír Janko (born 1955), Czech rower
- Marc Janko (born 1983), Austrian footballer
- Paul von Jankó, Hungarian inventor of the Jankó keyboard
- Richard Janko, British-American classicist
- Saidy Janko (born 1995), Swiss footballer
- Sepp Janko (1905–2001), Volksgruppenführer and SS Obersturmführer
- Zvonimir Janko (1932–2022), Croatian mathematician
