= Yanka =

Yanka is a Slavic name, a diminutive of the given name Yan, a transliteration of the name "Ян" (Jan). Notable people with the name include:

- Yanka Bryl, Belarusian writer
- Yanka Dyagileva (1966–1991), Russian poet and singer-songwriter
- Yanka Kanevcheva (1878–1920), Bulgarian revolutionary
- Yanka Kupala (1882–1942), pen name of Ivan Daminikavich Lutsevich, Belarusian poet and writer
- Yanka Maur (1883–1971), Belarusian writer

== See also ==
- Mar R. Yanka, alternative name of Natronai ben Nehemiah, Gaon of Pumbedita from 719 to 730
- Serbo-Croatian Janko, Hebrew Janka, or Bulgarian Yanko
