= Ivan Janek =

Slovak footballer

Personal information
- Date of birth: 1 July 1986 (age 40)
- Place of birth: Czechoslovakia
- Height: 1.80 m (5 ft 11 in)
- Position: Right back

Team information
- Current team: MFK Zemplín Michalovce B
- Number: 6

Youth career
- Slovan Bratislava

Senior career*
Years	Team	Apps	(Gls)
–2008	Slovan Bratislava	21	(0)
2008–2010	Bohemians 1905	9	(0)
2010	Viktoria Žižkov	7	(0)
2010–2011	MFK Zemplín Michalovce	32	(0)
2011–	MFK Zemplín Michalovce B		
- * Club domestic league appearances and goals as of 7 July 2011 ‡ National team caps and goals as of 3 April 2011

Ivan Janek (born 1 July 1986) is a Slovak football defender who currently plays for the Majstrovstvá regiónu club MFK Zemplín Michalovce B.

Janek began his playing career with ŠK Slovan Bratislava. He also had a spell with Bohemians 1905, making nine appearances in the Czech Gambrinus liga.
