= Záboří (České Budějovice District) =

- Municipality
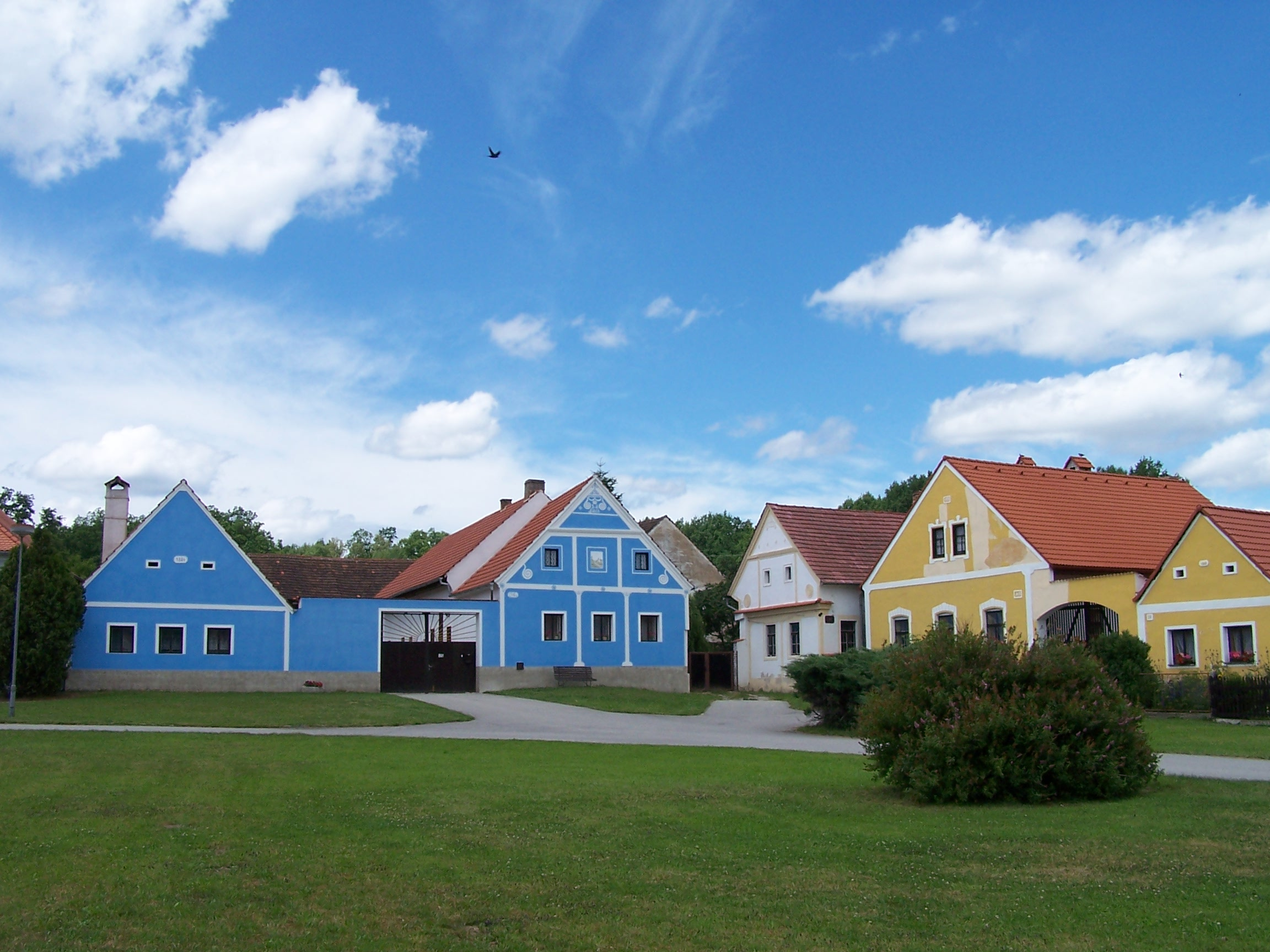
- Centre of Záboří

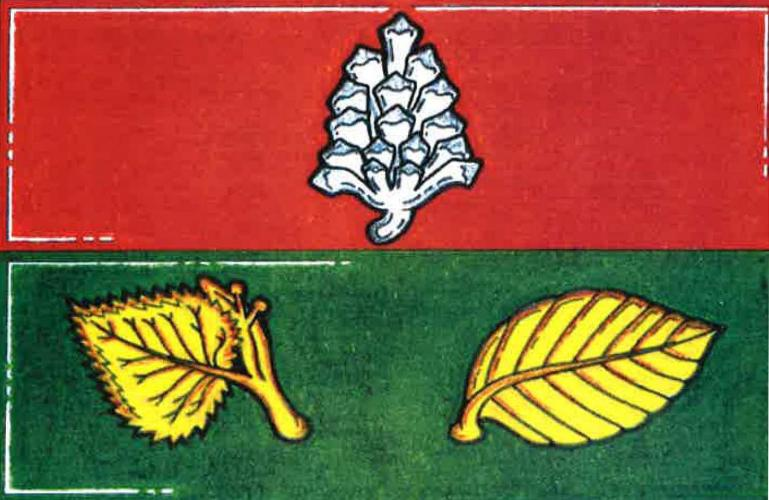
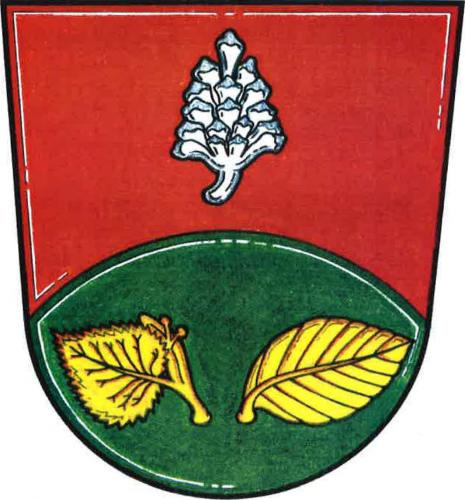
- Flag Coat of arms

- Location in the Czech Republic
- Coordinates: 48°59′24″N 14°16′2″E
- Country: Czech Republic
- Region: South Bohemian
- District: České Budějovice
- First mentioned: 1263

Area
  - Total: 16.57 km^{2} (6.40 sq mi)
- Elevation: 530 m (1,740 ft)

Population (2026-01-01)
  - Total: 373
  - Density: 22.5/km^{2} (58.3/sq mi)
- Time zone: UTC+1 (CET)
  - Summer (DST): UTC+2 (CEST)
- Postal code: 373 84
- Website: www.obeczabori.cz

Záboří is a municipality and village in České Budějovice District in the South Bohemian Region of the Czech Republic. It has about 400 inhabitants. The historic centre of the village with the folk Baroque architecture is well preserved and is protected as a village monument reservation. The village of Dobčice is protected as a village monument zone.

Záboří lies approximately 16 kilometres (10 mi) west of České Budějovice and 123 km (76 mi) south of Prague.

== Administrative division ==
Záboří consists of three municipal parts (in brackets population according to the 2021 census):

- Záboří (207)
- Dobčice (61)
- Lipanovice (92)

== Demographics ==
Historical population
Year	Pop.	±%
1869	655	—
1880	659	+0.6%
1890	589	−10.6%
1900	593	+0.7%
1910	566	−4.6%
1921	593	+4.8%
1930	589	−0.7%
1950	408	−30.7%
1961	385	−5.6%
1970	372	−3.4%
1980	333	−10.5%
1991	286	−14.1%
2001	297	+3.8%
2011	312	+5.1%
2021	360	+15.4%
Source: Censuses
