= Tomáš Janek =

Slovak ice hockey player

- Slovak Extraliga team: HC Slovan Bratislava

Tomáš Janek (born January 25, 1983) is a former Slovak professional ice hockey player who played with HC Slovan Bratislava in the Slovak Extraliga.
