= Jonek =

Jonek is a Polish masculine given name and a surname. It is a dialectal form of the surname Janek resulting from the dialectal replacement of '-a-' with '-o-'. The given name is a diminutive of the given name Jon (Jan) and the surname is derived from the given name. Archaic feminine forms of the surname include Jonkowa (after husband) and Jonkówna (after father). These forms are still used colloquially. Notable people and fictional characers include:

- Roksana Jonek (born 1978), Polish model and businesswoman, Miss Polonia 1997, Miss Tourism International 1998
- Jonek (character), recurring character from the Polish comic series by Szarlota Pawel

== See also ==
- Jonka, Jonek and Kleks, characters from the Polish comic series by Szarlota Pawel
