= Janek Ratnatunga =

Sri Lankan born Australian academic

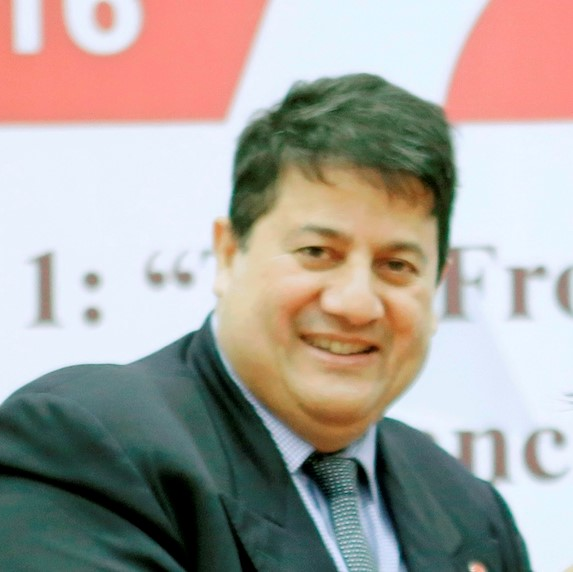
- Born: Sri Lanka
- Education: University of Bradford; Royal College Colombo
- Occupation: Chief Executive Officer
- Employer: Institute of Certified Management Accountants (Australia)

Janek Ratnatunga is a Sri Lankan born Australian academic. A professor of accounting, he is currently the chief executive officer of the Institute of Certified Management Accountants (Australia), and an adjunct professor of accounting at Swinburne University, Melbourne, Australia. Formerly, he was the dean and head of School of Commerce in University of South Australia and prior to that the head of the Department of Accounting & Finance and chair in business accounting at Monash University.

Ratnatunga is recognized as a pioneer in education innovation and its application in business settings in both macro and micro economic environments.

One achievement of Janek Ratnatunga was his appointment in January 1990 as an Honorary Research Professor in the Shanghai Branch of the Economical, Technical and Social Development Research Centre at the International Technology and Economy Institute of The State Council, People's Republic of China. He was one of the principal advisors charged with implementing the far-reaching market-economy reforms initiated by Chairman Deng Xiaoping. Ratnatunga conducted seminars and workshops in Shanghai and Beijing to senior officials of the State Council. He then followed these up with regular communication giving consultative advice to the institute; including regular on-site visits to Beijing and Shanghai right up to December 2000.

Educated at the Royal College, Colombo, he went on to gain his MBA and PhD from the University of Bradford. He has also held academic positions at the University of Melbourne and the University of Canberra in Australia; and the University of Washington, University of Richmond and University of Rhode Island in the USA. He is currently the Editor of the Journal of Applied Management Accounting Research. He has authored/co-authored twenty-eight books on strategic cost management, entrepreneurship, financial accounting, accounting theory and financial modelling; and over 250 academic and professional papers. Most of his contributions are listed on Research Gate.

He has worked in the profession as a Chartered Accountant with KPMG, and as a consultant for the World Bank. He has undertaken a consultancy for the Australian Department of Defence in the valuation of strategic capabilities, and has valued the ‘brand’ capabilities of Telecommunication and IT companies. He is also an authority on the business and accounting implications of global warming and carbon trading. His work in the area is titled, “An Inconvenient Truth about Accounting”.

In 2009 he received the joint American Accounting Association, AICPA (USA), CIMA (UK) and CMA (Canada) Impact on Management Accounting Practice Award.
