= Janko Sanković =

Yugoslav footballer

Personal information
- Full name: Janko Lazlo Sanković
- Date of birth: 7 May 1942 (age 84)
- Place of birth: Pula, SFR Yugoslavia
- Height: 1.90 m (6 ft 3 in)
- Position: Goalkeeper

Senior career*
Years	Team	Apps	(Gls)
1963–1969	Vojvodina	2	(0)
1970–1973	Independiente Santa Fe	82	(0)
1974	Deportes Quindío	9	(0)
1974–1975	SD Quito		
1976	Barcelona (Guayaquil)		
1977	Carmen Mora de Encalada		
1978	Universidad Católica (Quito)		
- * Club domestic league appearances and goals

Janko Sanković, also known as Yanko Sanković (born 7 May 1942), is a Yugoslavian retired football goalkeeper who spent much of his career playing in Latin America.

== Career ==
Born in Pula in 1942, Sanković played for FK Vojvodina in the 1960s and won the 1965–66 Yugoslav First League with them.

Sanković was signed to play for Independiente Santa Fe by then-manager Todor Veselinović in 1970. He played for the club until 1973, appearing in the 1972 Copa Libertadores. He also played in Colombia for Cúcuta Deportivo and Deportes Quindío.

He spent the rest of his career playing in Ecuador with Deportivo Quito, Barcelona Sporting Club, Club Deportivo Carmen Mora and Universidad Católica del Ecuador.
