= Janek Kiisman =

Estonian footballer

Personal information
- Full name: Janek Kiisman
- Date of birth: 3 January 1972 (age 54)
- Place of birth: Tartu, then part of Estonian SSR, Soviet Union
- Position: Defender

International career^{‡}
| Years | Team | Apps | (Gls) |
| 1994–1995 | Estonia | 8 | (0) |
- ‡ National team caps and goals as of 23 May 2009

Janek Kiisman (born 3 January 1972) is a retired association football defender from Estonia. He played for several clubs in his native country, including FC Flora Tallinn, JK Viljandi Tulevik and FC Santos Tartu.

== International career ==
Kiisman earned his first official cap for the Estonia national football team on 26 October 1994, when Estonia played Finland in a friendly match in the Kadrioru Stadium in Tallinn: 0:7. He obtained a total number of eight caps.
