= Janek Sarapson =

Estonian film, stage and television actor (1972–2026)

- Born: 20 March 1972; Tartu, then part of Estonian SSR, Soviet Union
- Died: 10 June 2026 (aged 54)
- Education: Tallinn University
- Occupations: Film, stage and television actor

Janek Sarapson (20 March 1972 – 10 June 2026) was an Estonian film, stage and television actor. He was best known for playing the recurring roles of Alo Ojakäär and Arvi Tibar in the Estonian criminal television series Kelgukoerad.

== Early life and education ==
Janek Sarapson was born in Tartu on 20 March 1972. He graduated from Tartu Secondary School No. 16 in 1990, then enrolled at Tallinn Pedagogical University, graduating in 1997.

== Career ==
From 1997 to 2006, Sarapson was engaged at the VAT Theatre in Tallinn. He also acted in several other Estonian theatres, including the Endla Theatre, the Kuressaare Theatre and the Vana Baskin Theatre. In addition to his work on the theatre stage, he also worked as an event manager and from 2008, taught acting at Tallinn Rahumäe Basic School.

Sarapson became known to a wider audience through his roles in the television series Hajameelselt abielus, Kättemaksukontor, Kelgukoerad and ENSV. He also appeared in the films Stiilipidu (2005), Lumekuninganna (2010), and Kertu (2013).

He was a member of the Estonian Actors' Union from 1998 to 2014.

== Death ==
Sarapson died on 10 June 2026, at the age of 54.
