= Ježevica monastery =

Serbian Orthodox monastery in Ježevica, Serbia

Coordinates: 43.8131°N 20.4009°E

Ježevica
- Јежевица
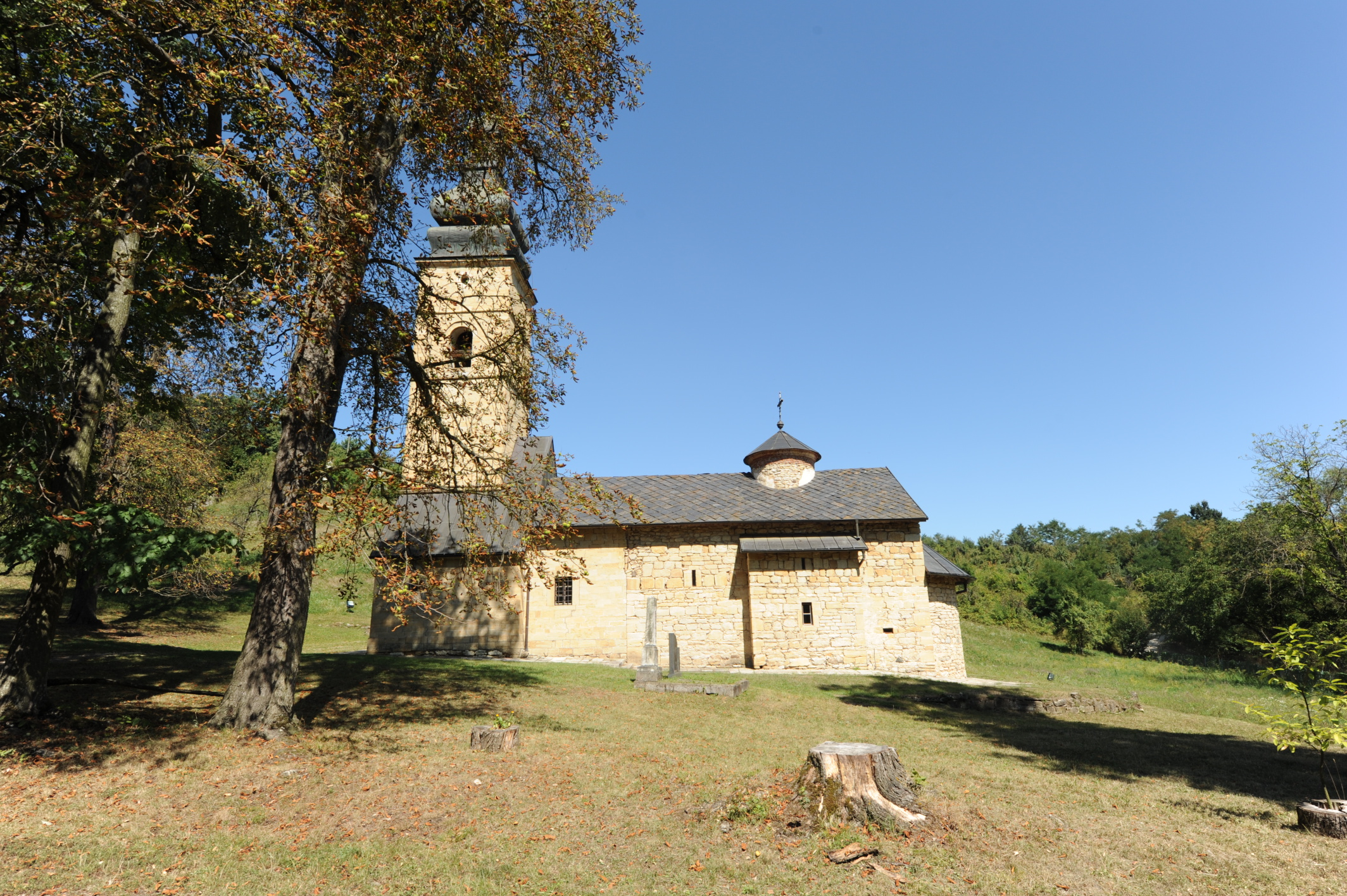

Religion
- Affiliation: Eastern Orthodox
- Ownership: Serbia

Location
- Location: near Ježevica and Banjica
- Municipality: Čačak
- Country: Serbia
- Interactive map of Ježevica

Architecture
- Completed: 14th century

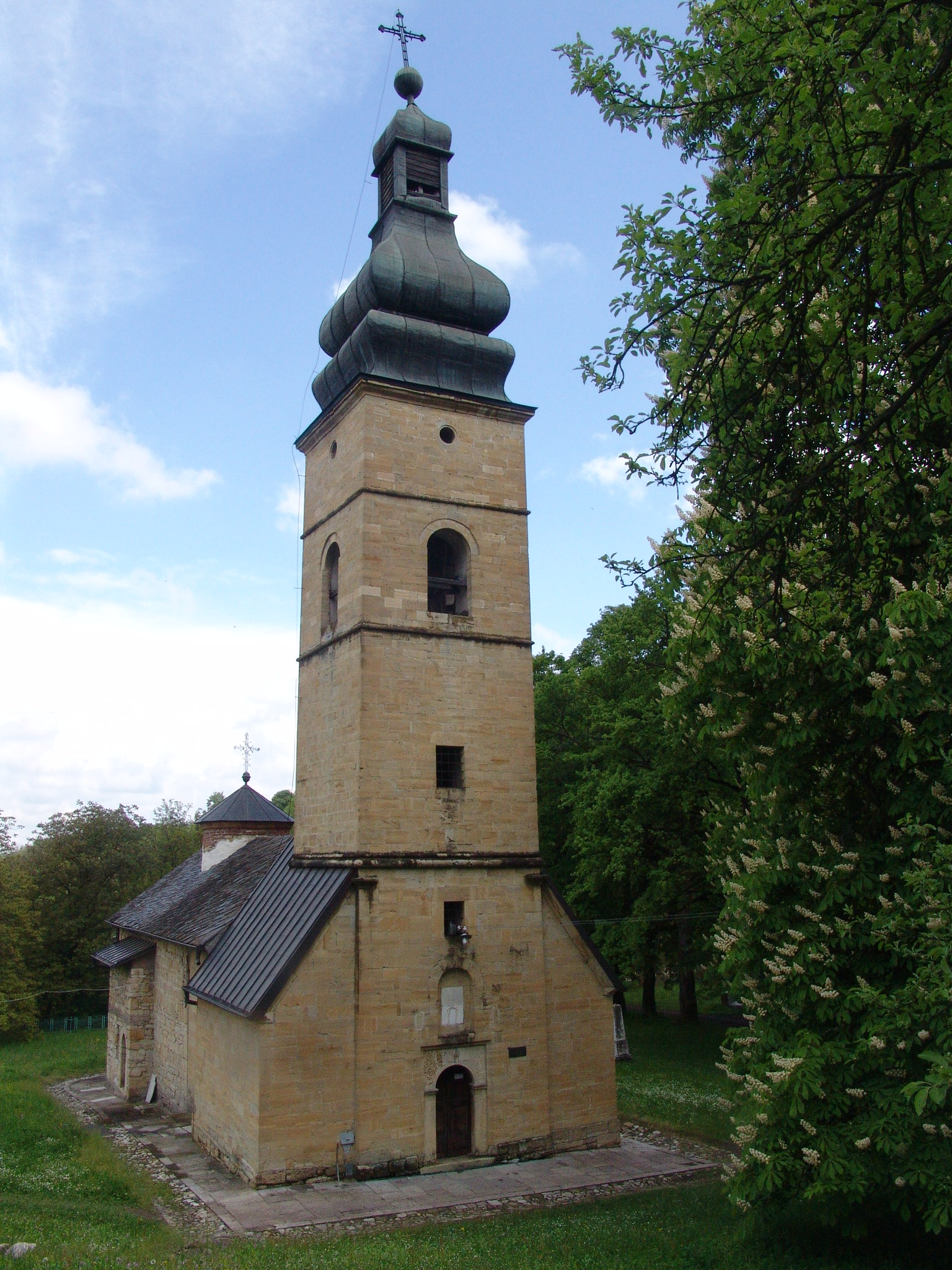
Ježevica Monastery.

Ježevica is a Serbian Orthodox monastery dedicated to St. Nicholas, located at the foothills of the Jelica mountain near the village of Ježevica, south of Čačak, Serbia. It is registered as a Cultural Heritage of Serbia (1982). The Ježevica manuscript, claimed to date to the 14th century, makes mention of the founding by a nobleman in the service of King Stefan Dušan (r. 1331–55), ban Milutin and his wife in 1337. According to tradition it was founded by King Stefan Milutin. Its interior was painted in 1609 and 1637. The baroque church bell tower was built in the 19th century.

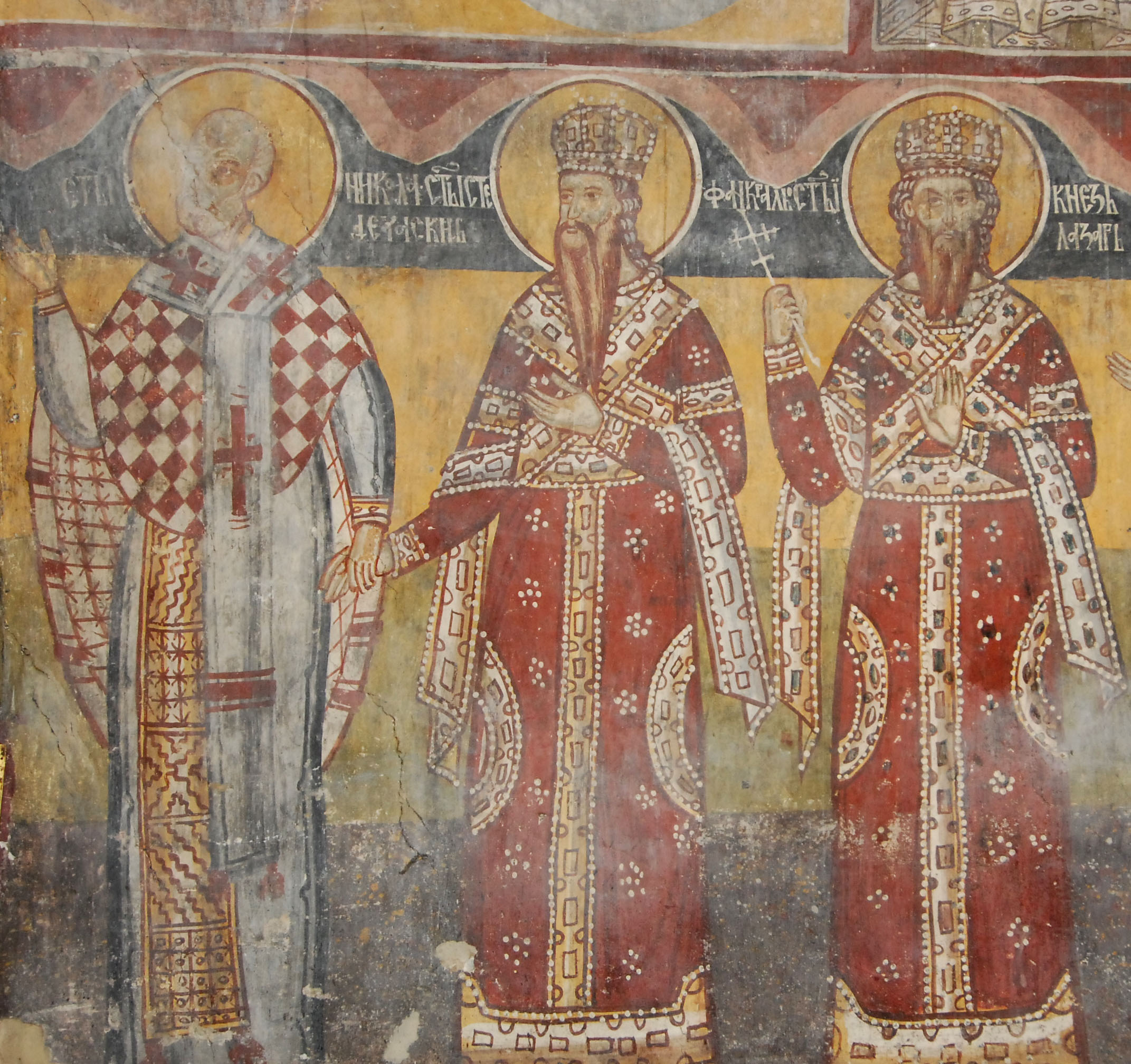
St. Nicholas, King Stefan Dečanski and Prince Lazar.
