= Janka =

Janka is a given name or a surname. The name may be a diminuntive of the given name Jan (name). It may also a spelling of the finnish surname Jänkä without diacritics. Notable people with the name include:

== Given name ==
- Janka Tilleman, birth name of Jolie Gabor (1896–1997), Austro-Hungarian Countess de Szigethy, mother of Magda, Zsa Zsa and Eva Gabor
- Ahmed Janka Nabay, Sierra Leonean musician

== Surname ==
- Carlo Janka (born 1986), Swiss alpine ski racer
- Erika Jänkä (born 1995), Finnish biathlete
- Les Janka, American consultant
- Gabriel Janka (1864–1932), Austrian wood researcher
- Victor von Janka (1837–1900), Hungarian botanist
- Walter Janka (1914–1994), German publisher

== See also ==
- }
- Yanka
- Janek (given name), masculine form
