= Les Janka =

American political consultant

- Education: Johns Hopkins University; University of Redlands alumn
- Occupation: Political consultant

Leslie A. Janka is President-Saudi Arabia for Quincy International LLC, resident in Riyadh Saudi Arabia.. He has more than 25 years experience as an international affairs specialist in the U.S. Government, business consulting and academic institutions. Prior to joining Quincy International, Janka was President of Raytheon Arabian Systems Company in Riyadh, Saudi Arabia. Prior to managing his independent consulting firm, Les Janka International from 1995 to 2007, he directed the international practice of the energy utility and telecommunications specialty consulting unit of Arthur Andersen, LLP. Janka is a frequent writer and lecturer on the Washington political scene, specializing in international affairs and the formulation of U.S. foreign and defense policy.

== Education ==
Janka was born June 9, 1940 in San Bernardino. A graduate of the University of Redlands, Janka received a master's degree in International Relations and Middle East Studies from the School of Advanced International Studies at Johns Hopkins University.

== Career ==
Janka worked for the United States Information Agency from 1964 to 1968 and was Assistant Dean of the School of Advanced International Studies of Johns Hopkins University from 1968 to 1971, when he was appointed Special Assistant to Henry Kissinger on the National Security Council at the White House.

Janka became Senior National Security Council Staff Member for Legislative and Public Affairs in 1974. He moved to the Pentagon in 1976 as Deputy Assistant Secretary of Defense for Near Eastern and African Affairs. Between 1978 and 1982, he worked for DGA International, a consultant assisting European corporations in marketing advanced military technology to the Pentagon.

In 1984, after serving in the White House as Deputy Press Secretary for Foreign Affairs under President Ronald Reagan, he founded the Council for American-Saudi Dialogue, a foreign policy lobbying and public affairs consulting firm.

In 2020, Janka, along with over 130 other former Republican national security officials, signed a statement that asserted that President Trump was unfit to serve another term, and "To that end, we are firmly convinced that it is in the best interest of our nation that Vice President Joe Biden be elected as the next President of the United States, and we will vote for him."

== See also ==
- History of the United States National Security Council 1969-1974
- History of the United States National Security Council 1974-1977
