= Jankov (Pelhřimov District) =

- Municipality
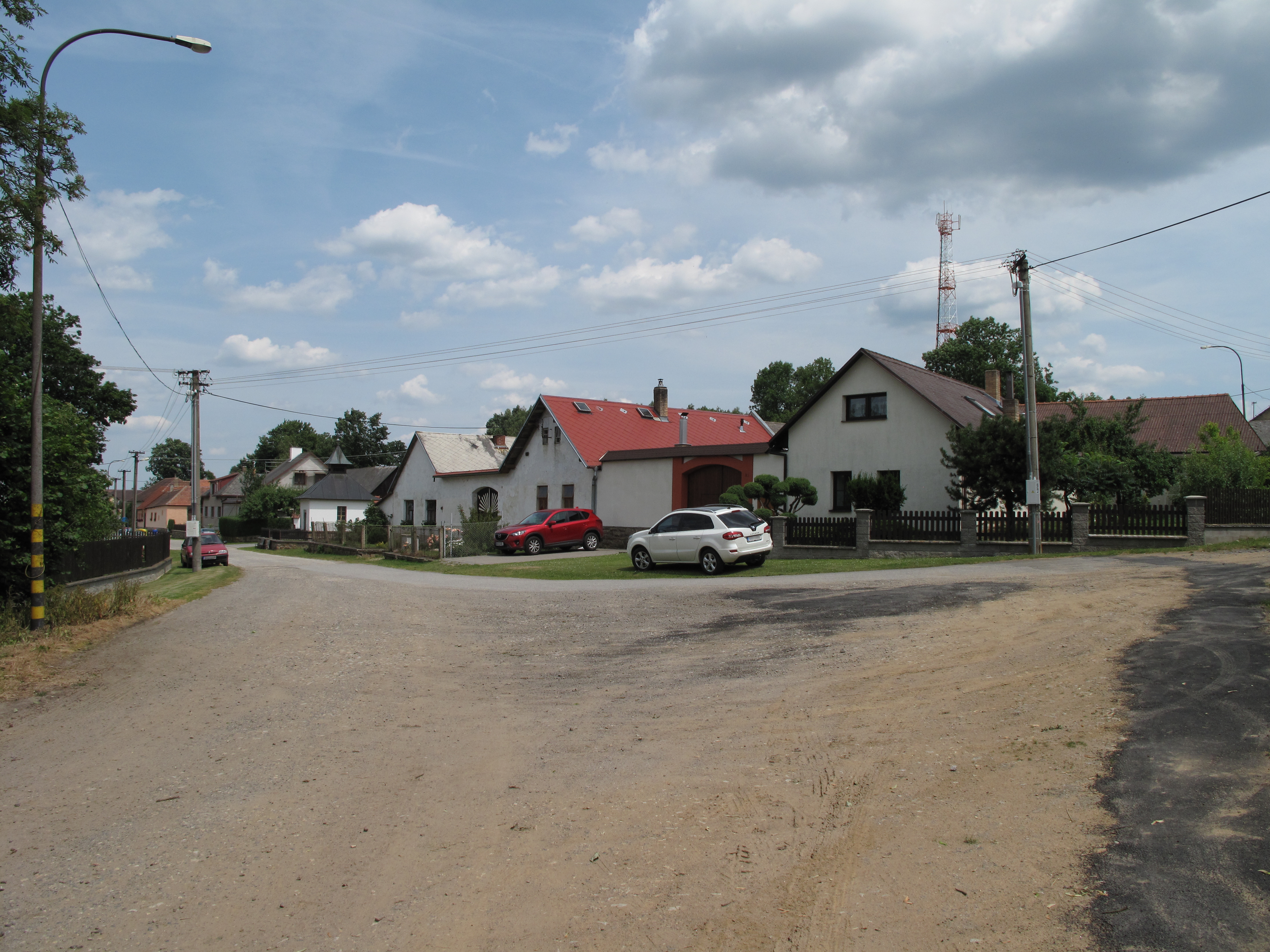
- Centre of Jankov

- Location in the Czech Republic
- Coordinates: 49°35′9″N 15°4′47″E
- Country: Czech Republic
- Region: Vysočina
- District: Pelhřimov
- First mentioned: 1242

Area
  - Total: 1.69 km^{2} (0.65 sq mi)
- Elevation: 665 m (2,182 ft)

Population (2026-01-01)
  - Total: 47
  - Density: 28/km^{2} (72/sq mi)
- Time zone: UTC+1 (CET)
  - Summer (DST): UTC+2 (CEST)
- Postal code: 393 01
- Website: www.jankov.eu

Jankov is a municipality and village in Pelhřimov District in the Vysočina Region of the Czech Republic. It has about 50 inhabitants.

Jankov lies approximately 13 kilometres (8 mi) east of Pelhřimov, 15 km (9 mi) west of Jihlava, and 102 km (63 mi) south-east of Prague.

== Etymology ==
The name is derived from the personal name Janek (a diminutive of Jan), meaning "Janek's (court)".

== Demographics ==
Historical population
Year	Pop.	±%
1869	164	—
1880	162	−1.2%
1890	158	−2.5%
1900	141	−10.8%
1910	149	+5.7%
1921	164	+10.1%
1930	158	−3.7%
1950	96	−39.2%
1961	110	+14.6%
1970	84	−23.6%
1980	59	−29.8%
1991	41	−30.5%
2001	38	−7.3%
2011	36	−5.3%
2021	36	+0.0%
Source: Censuses
