= Rosa Janku =

Austrian resistance fighter (1882–1944)

Rosa Janku (10 July 1882 – 5 December 1944) was an Austrian seamstress and resistance fighter during World War II. She was caught, convicted on espionage charges and executed by Nazi forces in Vienna.

== Biography ==
Born Rosa Netuschil on 10 July 1882 in Víska, Bohemia, Austria-Hungary (now the Czech Republic), she attended a Czech elementary school and learned the trade of a seamstress. By 1902, she was making her living in Vienna, Austria, as a tailor's assistant.

Janku had been a politically inactive widow working as a railroad attendant at the Vienna-Heiligenstadt train station since 1929. Her resistance work began after she met with a communist resistance cell in 1943.

At that time, Austrian emigrants and former fighters fleeing the Spanish Civil War were returning to Vienna with forged papers. Among them was Ludwig Karl Beer, a carpenter's assistant who had already been illegally active as a communist in 1936. In March 1938, he had emigrated to France and was now returning to Vienna under the pseudonym Francis Bertrand Renaud. Beer took up residence with his aunt Anna Wittmann, who was a neighbour of Janku.

In her apartment, Rosa Janku introduced Beer to another resistor, Rudolf Follner, whom she had met through her work for the Vienna Stadtbahn. In an August 1943 raid of her apartment, police discovered communist leaflets and other incriminating evidence of resistance activities. She was arrested for "preparing for high treason."

Janku was convicted and sentenced to death by the People's Court in November 1944. The judgement said, "She acted out of a sense of Marxist solidarity." The sentence was carried out on 5 December 1944, at the Vienna Regional Court.

== Memorial sites ==
The bodies of the executed victims of the Vienna Regional Court were buried in Group 40 of the Central Cemetery. In 2013, Group 40 was declared a National Memorial.

Janku's name is listed among those memorialized on plaques in the room where executions took place in the Vienna Regional Court for Criminal Matters.
