= List of people of the Second Serbian Uprising =

List of people of the Second Serbian Uprising, active in 1815. It includes Serbian revolutionaries—veterans of the First Serbian Uprising (1804–13), and Ottoman personnel.

== Serbian commanders ==
| Name | Lifespan | Rank | Notes |
|---|---|---|---|
Commander-in-chief
| Miloš Obrenović | 1780–1860 | Vožd (1815) vojvoda knez | Led the uprising, brother of Milan, Jakov and Jevrem. Managed to gain semi-autonomy under Ottoman vassalage. Regarded Father of the Nation. |
Main generals
| Petar Nikolajević Moler | 1775–1816 | vojvoda of Soko (–1812) | Nephew of Hadži-Ruvim. Active in the first uprising. Exiled in "Austria". Became Prime Minister (1815–16). |
| Arsenije Loma | 1768–1815 | vojvoda of Kačer knežina (1811) | A captain under Milan Obrenović and one of the main commanders in the Rudnik nahija in the first uprising. Remained after the suppression of the first uprising. Nearest circle of Miloš. Killed after Rudnik. |
| Lazar Mutap | 1775–1815 | vojvoda in Rudnik nahija (1811) | A captain under Milan Obrenović and one of the main commanders in the Rudnik nahija in the first uprising. Remained after the suppression of the first uprising. Nearest circle of Miloš. Died of wounds from Čačak. |
| Milić Drinčić | 1778–1815 | vojvoda of Crnagora knežina (1811) | A captain under Milan Obrenović and one of the main commanders in the Rudnik nahija in the first uprising. Remained after the suppression of the first uprising. Nearest circle of Miloš. Fell at Dublje. |
Lesser commanders and captains
| Cincar-Marko | 1777–1822 | vojvoda of Šabačka Posavina | Active in the first uprising, vojvoda of Soko nahija (1812–13). Exiled in "Austria". Wounded at Dublje. |
| Jovan Dobrača | 1765–1839 | vojvoda | |
| Raka Levajac | 1777–1833 | vojvoda | Remained after the suppression of the first uprising. |
| Tanasko Rajić | 1754–1815 | vojvoda | A flag-bearer of Karađorđe in the first uprising. Fell heroically at Ljubić. |
| Ilija Strelja | d. 1825 | vojvoda | Active in the first uprising. Exiled in Petrovaradin. Rose up the Smederevo nahiya and participated at Požarevac. |
| Radosav Jelečanin | d. 18XX | vojvoda (II.) in Gornji Ibar | Active in the first uprising. Led Gornji Ibar men in the second uprising. Besieged Karanovac. |
| Avram Lukić | d. 18XX | vojvoda knez of Dragačevo | Active in the first uprising. Led Dragačevo men in the second uprising. Besieged Karanovac. |
| Milisav Čamdžija | 1770s–1815 | kapetan | Active in the first uprising, kapetan under Sima Marković. Heroic, had ten wounds, fell at Palež. |
| Bakal-Milosav | 1770–1823 | kapetan | Active in the first uprising, kapetan under Luka Lazarević. Exiled in Syrmia. |
Other
| Jovan Obrenović | 1787–1850 | (soldier) under Miloš Obrenović | Younger brother of Miloš. Later guverner of Rudnik and Požega military districts. |
| Jevrem Obrenović | 1790–1856 | (soldier) under Miloš Obrenović | Youngest brother of Miloš. Later obor-knez of Šabac nahija. |
| Sima Katić | 1783–1832 | bimbaša (1808) | Active in the first uprising, bimbaša under Stojan Čupić. Exiled in Syrmia. Organized Mačva in the second uprising. |
| Nikola Smiljanić | 1760–1815 | – | Orthodox archpriest. Active in the first uprising. Organized Mačva in the second uprising. |
| Marko Štitarac | 17XX–18XX | – | Organized Mačva in the second uprising. |
| Ilija Srdan | 17XX–18XX | – | Organized Mačva in the second uprising. |
| Nikola Katić | 17XX–18XX | – | Active in the first uprising. |
| Jovica Milutinović | 17XX–18XX | – | Active in the first uprising. |
| Sima Nenadović | 1793–1815 | – | Son of Jakov Nenadović. Fell heroically at Dublje. |
| Milosav Zdravković-Resavac | 1787–1854 | vojvoda of Resava | Son of Milija Zdravković. |
| Gaja Dabić | 17XX–18XX | – | Active in the first uprising. |
| Đuka Stojićević | | | Younger brother of vojvoda Miloš Pocerac (d. 1811). |
| Banovac | 17XX–18XX | – | Active in the first uprising. |
| Boja Bogićević | 17XX–18XX | – | Active in the first uprising. |
| Milutin Petrović | 1791–1861 | | Younger brother of Hajduk-Veljko, son-in-law of Radič Petrović, vojvoda of Krajina nahija (1813). Defender. |
| Uzun-Mirko | 1782–1868 | bimbaša | Active in the first uprising. Exiled in Vienna. |
| Sima Milosavljević-Amidža-Paštrmac | 1776–1836 | barjaktar | Active in the first uprising as Karađorđe's standard-bearer. Participated in Hadži-Prodan's rebellion. |
| Melentije Pavlović | 1776–1833 | dobošar | Priest. Active in the first uprising. Became the confessor of the Obrenović dynasty. |
| Milutin Savić | 1762–1842 | knez of Jasenica | Active in the first uprising. Father of Ilija Garašanin. |
| Filip Petrović | 17XX–18XX | – | Priest. Active in the first uprising. |
| Toma Vučić Perišić | 1787–1859 | – | Active in the first uprising as Karađorđe's bodyguard. Remained after the suppression of the first uprising. Participated in Hadži-Prodan's rebellion. |
| Aksentije Miladinović | 1760–1820 | knez | Active in the first uprising. |
| Jovan Vukomanović | 1784–1815 | komandant of Požarevac | Brother-in-law of Miloš Obrenović. Fell at Požarevac. |
| Petar Tucaković | 17XX–18XX | – | Active in the first uprising. Participated in Hadži-Prodan's rebellion. |
| Pavle Bogdanović-Dušmanić | 1788–1850 | (soldier) | knez of Golubac knežina (1816), major (1833), magistrate in Požarevac (1839–42). |
| Stevan Dobrnjac | 1778–1835 | knez of Morava knežina (1815) | Brother of Petar Dobrnjac, later opposition leader. |
| Ranko Dmitrović | d. 1820 | priest | Armed priest. |

== Serbian diplomacy ==
| Name | Lifespan | Notes |
|---|---|---|
| Petar Dobrnjac | 1771–1831 | A vojvoda in the first uprising, served as Miloš's deputy at the Imperial Russian court. |
| Sima Marković | 1768–1817 | A vojvoda and politician in the first uprising, part of the rebel delegation in Vienna to Russia in June 1815. |

== Ottoman personnel ==
| Name | Lifespan | Rank | Notes |
|---|---|---|---|
Commander-in-chiefs
| Sulejman Pasha Skopljak | fl. 1804–d. 1818 | Vizier of Belgrade (1813–15) pasha | From Bosnia. Appointed after suppressing the first uprising. Executed many Serbs after Hadži-Prodan's rebellion. Decisively defeated in the second uprising and replaced. |
| Hurshid Pasha | d. 1822 | Vali of Bosnia (1813–20) pasha | As Vali of Rumelia, he joined the 1809 campaign in the first uprising. Became Grand Vizier in 1812. Led Bosnian army in the second uprising. |
Main generals
| Imşir Pasha "Ćaja-paša" | fl. 1813–d. 1815 | kethüda (assistant) of Sulejman Pasha mirmiran (distinguished commander) | From the Sanjak of Herzegovina, part of Sulejman Pasha's administration. Executed and captured many during Hadži-Prodan's rebellion. Fell at Morava while reinforcing Čačak. |
| Ali Pasha of Zvornik | fl. 1813–15 | (commander) under Hurshid Pasha | From the Sanjak of Zvornik, part of Hurshid Pasha's Bosnian army. |
| Ibrahim Ali "Maraš" | fl. 1815 | (commander) under Hurshid Pasha pasha (two-graded) | From Nikšić, part of Hurshid Pasha's Bosnian army. Captured at Dublje, then released by Miloš. |
| Latif Agha | fl. 1813–15 | mütesellim of Čačak agha | From Slišane. Appointed mütesellim of Čačak by Serčesma, the deputy of Hurshid Pasha. Died of wounds from Karanovac. |
| Mustafa Pasha | fl. 1813–15 | mütesellim of Užice agha | Petitioned Vali Hurshid Pasha on military aid against rebels in Rudnik, Soko, Čačak and Valjevo. |
| Ašin-beg | fl. 1813–15 | mütesellim of Brusnica bey | Appointed mütesellim of Brusnica by Serčesma, the deputy of Hurshid Pasha. Befriended Miloš. Held office during Hadži-Prodan's rebellion. Spared by Miloš in the second uprising. |
| Tokatlić-aga | fl. 1804–d. 1815 | mütesellim of Rudnik town agha | Held office during first uprising. Killed in ambush after Rudnik. Avenged by his nephew who killed Arsenije Loma. |
Other
| Kara-Mustafa | fl. 1804–d. 1815 | Vizier kapi-binbaşı | Led detachment of 1,000 in the battle of Čačak, pursued and fell at Juhor near Sjenica. |
| Selim | fl. 1815 | (commander) under Ćaja-paša kethüda (assistant) | Led detachment of 1,300 with Musaga Balabaga in the battle of Čačak. |
| Musaga Balabaga | fl. 1815 | (commander) under Ćaja-paša | Led detachment of 1,300 with Selim in the battle of Čačak. |
| Mahmud Agha Ljaja | fl. 1815 | kethüda (assistant) of Adem Agha binbaşı agha | Sent by Adem Agha of the Sanjak of Novi Pazar to aid Latif Agha, led detachment of 1,500 with Yusuf Agha Balja. Surrendered Karanovac. |
| Yusuf Agha Balja | fl. 1815 | (commander) under Adem Agha agha | Sent by Adem Agha of the Sanjak of Novi Pazar to aid Latif Agha, led detachment of 1,500 with Mahmud Agha Ljaja. Surrendered Karanovac. |
| Asan-delibaša | d. 1815 | commander of Vidin deli (delibaşı) | Sent from the Sanjak of Vidin, led detachment of 1,900 men, fell at Požarevac. |
| Osman Mazhar | 1789–1861 | (soldier) under Sulejman Pasha | From Bosnia, son of Sulejman Pasha, member of his army. Wounded at Jabučje. Later Vizier of Scutari (1843–1854). |
| Muhamed (Sulejmanpašić) | fl. 1813–15 | (soldier) under Sulejman Pasha | From Bosnia, son of Sulejman Pasha, member of his army. |
| Osman-beg | fl. 1813–15 | (soldier) under Ibrahim Ali bey | From Nikšić, son of Ibrahim Ali, member of his army. Fell at Dublje. |
| Ali-beg Karafejzić | fl. 1813–15 | bey | Son of Kara-Fejza. |

== Sources ==
- Batalaka, Lazar Arsenijević (1899). Историја српског устанка: део други [History of the Serbian Uprising: Part Two]. Vol. II. Штампано у штампарији – via Google Books.
- Milićević, Milan Đ. (1888). Поменик знаменитих људи у српског народа новијега доба [Memory Book]. Издање Чупићеве задужбине – via Archive.org.
- Nenadović, Konstantin N. (1903) [1883]. Живот и дела великог Ђорђа Петровића Кара-Ђорђа [Life and Deeds of Great Đorđe Petrović Kara-Đorđe]. Vol. I (2 ed.). Belgrade: Штампа Савића и Комп. – via Archive.org.
- Nenadović, Konstantin N. (1884). Живот и дела великог Ђорђа Петровића Кара-Ђорђа [Life and Deeds of Great Đorđe Petrović Kara-Đorđe]. Vol. II (1 ed.). Vienna: У Штампарији Јована Н. Вернаја – via Google Books.
- Protić, Kosta (1891). "Ратни догађаји из другог српског устанка, год. 1815". Годишњица Николе Чупића. XII. Државна штампарија: 1–104 – via Google Books.
