= Belotić =

Belotić may refer to the following villages in Serbia:

- Belotić (Bogatić), Mačva District
- Belotić (Osečina), Kolubara District
- Belotić (Vladimirci), Mačva District
