= Nikola Nikolajević =

Serbian revolutionary (b. 1780, d. 1821)

Nikola Nikolajević (Serbian Cyrillic: Никола Николајевић; 1780-after 1842) was one of four leaders (along with Sima Marković, Pavle Popović and Milisav Čamdžija) of the Belgrade Nahiya in the first Serbian insurrection. His son Konstantin Nikolajević (1821-1877) was married to Poleksija Karađorđević, daughter of Aleksandar Karađorđević and sister of King Peter I of Serbia.

Nikola Nikolajević was a scholarship stipendist of Metropolitan Stevan Stratimirović of Karlovci, where he graduated from the seminary. He moved to Karađorđe's Serbia in 1805 and worked as a teacher in Ostružnica in the municipality of Čukarica, then the Posavina principality of the Belgrade nahiya, where he and his wife Makra were born. After the Second Serbian Uprising, he was in the service of Prince Miloš, as the manager of the financial department (aznadar). He died in a hunt in 1821. It is presumed that he was killed on the order of Prince Miloš, because he was involved in events in which, among other things, Princess Ljubica Obrenović killed Miloš's famous mistress Petrija, thinking that the prince would marry her.

== Literature ==
- Dragoslav Janković, Srpska Država Prvog Ustanka, Nolit, 1984.
- Ćorović, Vladimir (2003). Карађорђе и први српски устанак. Свет књиге. ISBN 978-86-7396-057-9.
- "Obrenovići i Muzejskim i drugim zbirkama Srbije i Evreope IV", Muzej Rudničkog-Takovskog Kraja, Gornji Milanovac, 2016.

== See also ==
- List of Serbian Revolutionaries
