= Battle of Karanovac (1815) =

Battle of the Second Serbian Uprising

- Part of the Second Serbian Uprising
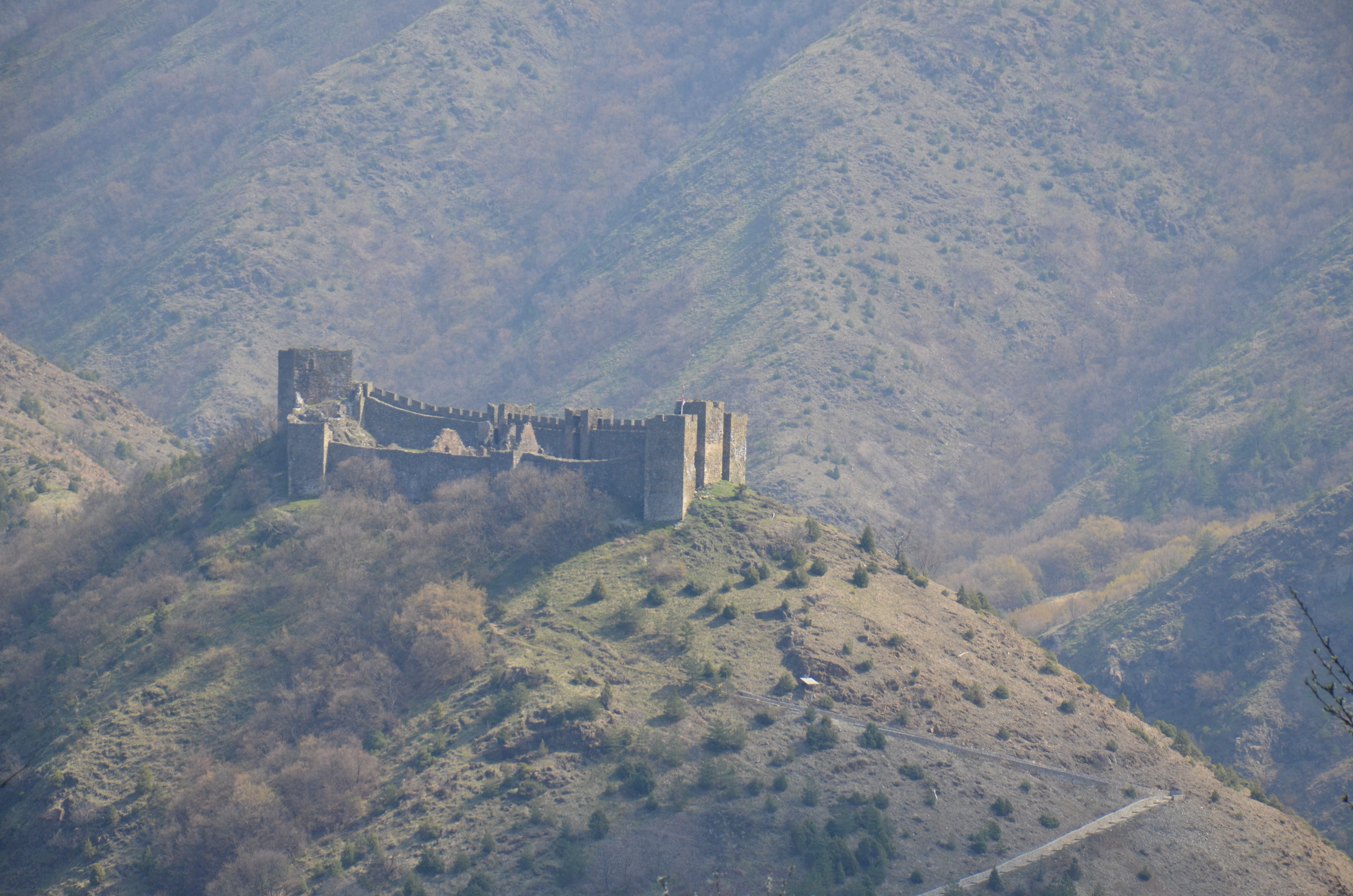
- View of Maglič.
Date	June–Early July 1815
Location	Near Maglič and Kraljevo, Ottoman Empire (today Serbia)
Result	Serbian victory
Territorial changes	Karanovac handed over to the Serbs

Belligerents
Serbian rebels	Ottoman Empire

Commanders and leaders
Miloš Obrenović; Radosav Jelečanin	Latif Agha (DOW); Mahmud Agha Ljaja (surrendered); Yusuf Agha Balja (surrendered)

Units involved
Gornji Ibar rebels	Čačak soldiers Karanovac soldiers Novi Pazar soldiers

Strength
Minor	2,100+

Casualties and losses
Minor	Minor

The Battle of Karanovac was a series of skirmishes between the Ottoman mutesellim (mayor) of Čačak, Latif Agha, with support from the Sanjak of Novi Pazar, against the Serbian rebel army led by Miloš Obrenović in the area of Karanovac (now Kraljevo). Encircled, the Ottoman troops and local Muslims handed over the town to the Serbian rebels after the rebel takeover of Čačak and Požarevac.

== History ==
Prior to the outbreak of the Second Serbian Uprising, the Ottoman mutesellim (mayor) of Čačak, Latif Agha, moved with 600 Čačak Ottoman troops to Karanovac where he settled. He stayed at Karanovac, which had a large hillfort, and was tasked with protecting the area from Serbian rebel attacks. Čačak was left with 600 soldiers and was to be reinforced from Belgrade, as he had requested. For Karanovac, he requested reinforcements from Adem Agha (or "Adem-paša"), the sanjak-bey of Novi Pazar. From the Takovo Assembly (23 April), Miloš wrote to Radosav Jelečanin, the Karanovac-born veteran vojvoda (general) in Gornji Ibar and priest Filip Petrović of Studenica to rise up the people. They sent the civilians to safe refuges and collected rebels in the Požega-Čačak nahiya and Studenica knežina. At the same time as Ćaja-paša arrived at Čačak, some 1,500 Novi Pazar troops (including "Arnauts") under the command of binbaşı Mahmud Agha Ljaja (also the kethüda of Adem Agha) and Yusuf Agha Balja arrived at Karanovac.

The Serbian rebels had prior to this mustered somewhat in the area, seeking to stop the Novi Pazar reinforcement from reaching Karanovac. Radosav Jelečanin was put in charge by Miloš Obrenović to muster an army that would counter both Karanovac and the Novi Pazar troops. Jelečanin sent all women and unfit to the Maglič fortress and put some soldiers around and inside to protect it. Maglič is a medieval fortress located 24 km south of Karanovac. The Novi Pazar troops arrived at Stolovi, where Jelečanin's troops ambushed them, and there was a violent fight in which the Serbian rebels had the upper hand. Jelečanin planned to first deal with the Novi Pazar troops and then to attack Karanovac. Eventually, Latif Agha arrived with many cavalry from the rear of the rebels and attacked, in order to ease the Novi Pazar troops flight to Karanovac. The Serbian rebels were forced to retreat to Maglič after realizing that the Ottoman troops were more numerous and stronger. The Ottomans pursued the retreating Serbs for a short while and then captured some Serbian refugees further from Maglič, then returned to Karanovac.

The Serbian rebels immediately encircled Karanovac and held it in siege. Latif Agha, tired from the battle and still in pain from wounds received in the first uprising, died after some days, but the Ottoman troops stayed put. The Turks at Karanovac felt pressured and did not exit into the fields. Both sides were too weak to engage and only monitored each other. Upon the takeover of Čačak, Miloš sent vojvoda and knez of Dragačevo, Avram Lukić, to Karanovac to improve the siege and put pressure. Lukić put up sentries and ambuscades on all sides, and ensured that Karanovac and the region was unable to receive reinforcements from Bosnia and was safe from incursions. The "Turks" now offered to hand over the town and fortification to Miloš if they be escorted by the Serbians to Ottoman territory with their weapons. They demanded that the handover be made only with Miloš. After taking over Požarevac, Miloš went to Karanovac and was handed over the town and escorted the Turks to Ottoman territory. On his way to Karanovac, Miloš sent orders to Aksentije Miladinović and archpriest Nikola Smiljanić to go to the Drina where he would join them after taking care of Karanovac. Adem Agha was acquainted with Miloš and they exchanged letters.

== See also ==
- Timeline of the Serbian Revolution
- Serbian Army (revolutionary)
- List of Serbian Revolutionaries

== Annotations ==
1. K. Protić call the events the "liberation of Karanovac" (Oslobođenje Karanovca). Sarajlija call the events the "Handover of Karanovac" (Predaja Karanovca).
2. Milićević dated the letter to Aksentije and Smiljanić to 11 July [O.S. 29 June] 1815. K. Protić dated the handover to the beginning of July 1815.

== Sources ==
- Milićević, Milan Đ. (1888). Поменик знаменитих људи у српског народа новијега доба [Memory Book]. Издање Чупићеве задужбине – via Archive.org.
- Nenadović, Konstantin N. (1884). Живот и дела великог Ђорђа Петровића Кара-Ђорђа [Life and Deeds of Great Đorđe Petrović Kara-Đorđe]. Vol. II (1 ed.). Vienna: У Штампарији Јована Н. Вернаја – via Google Books.
- Nenadović, Konstantin N. (1903) [1883]. Живот и дела великог Ђорђа Петровића Кара-Ђорђа [Life and Deeds of Great Đorđe Petrović Kara-Đorđe]. Vol. I (2 ed.). Belgrade: Штампа Савића и Комп. – via Archive.org.
- Protić, Kosta (1891). "Ратни догађаји из другог српског устанка, год. 1815". Годишњица Николе Чупића. XXXI. Državna štamparija: 1–104 – via Google Books.
- Sarajlija, Sima Milutinović (1888). Istorija Srbije od 1813-1815. god [History of Serbia 1813-1815]. Pečatano u štampariji Kraljevine Srbije. pp. 337–.
