= Srezojevci =

- Village
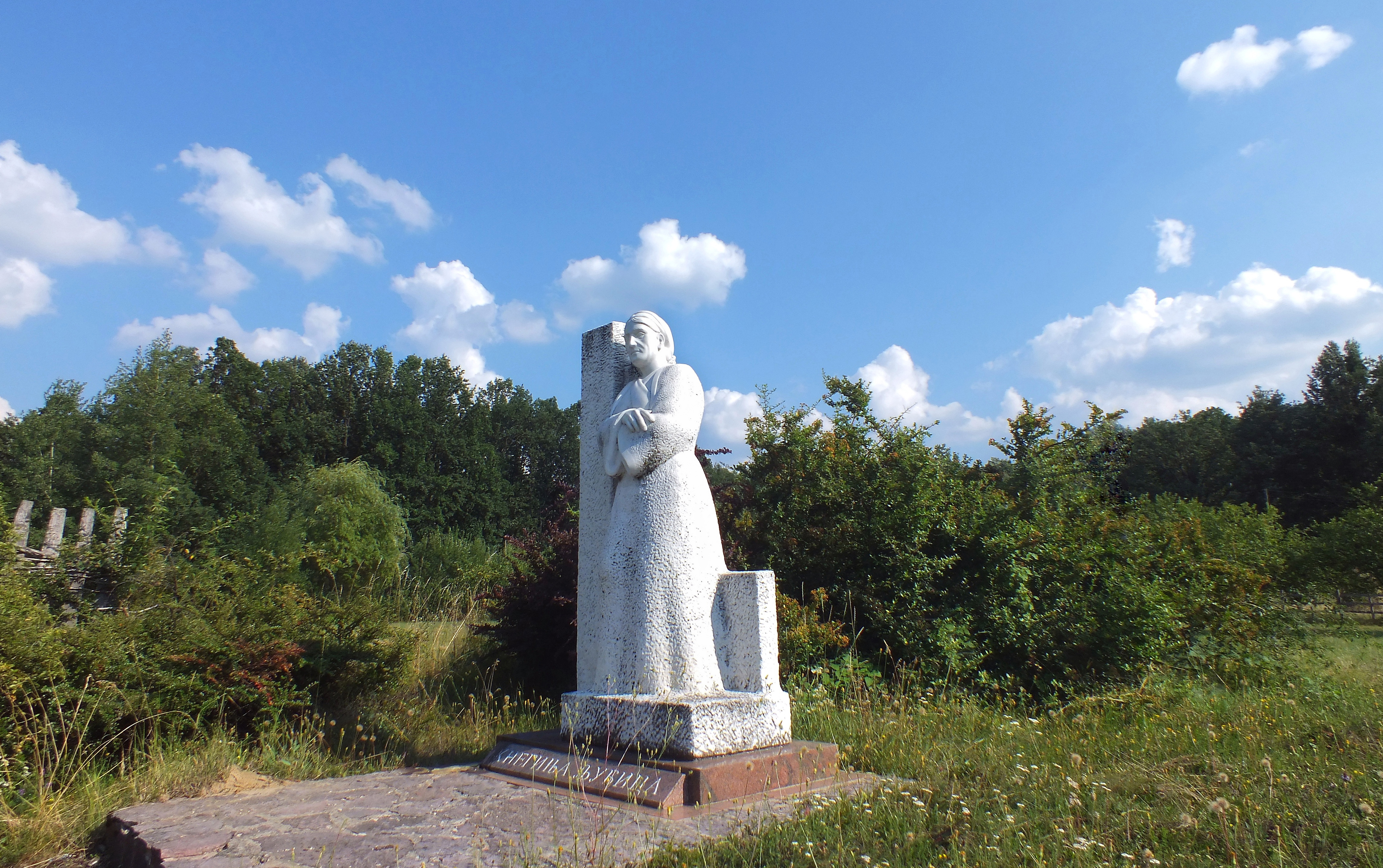

- Location within Serbia
- Coordinates: 44°01′18″N 20°16′34″E
- Country: Serbia
- District: Moravica District
- Municipality: Gornji Milanovac

Population (2002)
  - Total: 424
- Time zone: UTC+1 (CET)
  - Summer (DST): UTC+2 (CEST)

Srezojevci is a village in the municipality of Gornji Milanovac, Serbia. According to the 2002 census, the village has a population of 424 people.

The village was active in the Serbian Revolution, being organized into the knežina (administrative unit) of Brusnica (Takovo) during the First Serbian Uprising (1804–13). Among notable local revolutionaries were: Jovan Vukomanović (1792–1815) who fell at Požarevac; Dmitar Vukomanović, Milisav Vukomanović, Radivoje Vukomanović, Ratko Vukomanović who all fell at Zasavica; Luka Vukomanović and Milovan Vukomanović who were wounded at Zasavica; Šeaga Stevanović; Rubak; Teodosije Vuković.

The Serbian princess consort Ljubica Vukomanović (1788–), spouse of Miloš Obrenović, was born in the village.
