= Milić od Mačve =

Serbian artist (1934–2000)

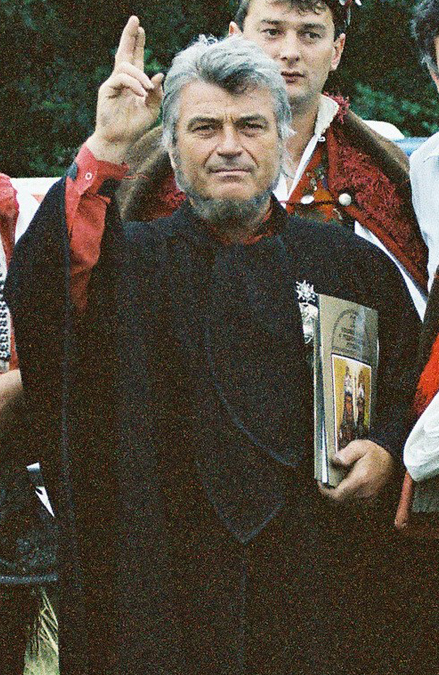
Milić od Mačve in 1990

Milić Stanković (26 October 1934 – 8 December 2000), known by his artistic name Milić of Mačva (Serbian: Милић од Мачве, Milić od Mačve; 30 October 1934 – 8 December 2000), was a Serbian painter and artist often named Balkan's Dalí for his figurative surrealist paintings.

== Biography ==
Stanković was born in 1934 in Belotić, Kingdom of Yugoslavia.

When he was in the second year of high school in the town of Šabac, a professor of drawing, Đorđe Kostić came to Šabac from Belgrade, demolished after the Nazi bombardment. Kostić founded the art section in the basement of the high school. The professor had a special ability to recognise children gifted in painting, including Milić. As a high school student, Milić participated in painting exhibitions in the town.

Because of poverty, his parents decided that he should attend the Military Academy in Belgrade. Milić was accepted, but at the last moment, he managed to convince his parents that architecture would be better for him and more promising for the future. Young Milić had talent and goodwill, and now it became important for him to remain in Belgrade. At the School of Architecture, he was taught by an extraordinary draughtsman – Pivo Karamatijević. The first year, he lived in the Students' City, New Belgrade.

In the fall of 1953, Milić began socialising with the family of Đorđe Kadijević. Milić and Đorđe were constantly fantasising about painting. The next year, Milić passed the entrance exam to the Academy of Fine Arts, in contrast to Kadijević, who did not pass it.

Milić received support from his mother, Desanka, for admission to the academy, and he was especially encouraged by his high school classmate Vlada Lalicki, from Šabac. Later, as a specially gifted student, he received a scholarship. At the Academy of Fine Arts, he studied in the class of professor Kosta Hakman, and after Hakman's death, with professor Ljubica Sokić. Milić graduated from the academy in 1959.

On Milić's first solo exhibition, Herbert Beck, a famous collector from Geneva, bought seven of his paintings for 770,000 dinars, a significant amount at the time.

Milić was a very prolific painter. As of February 2000, he had painted around 7,500 paintings, more than 13,000 graphics and hundreds of icons and frescoes. By his works, he defended the Serbian tradition from oblivion and distortion.

He died on 8 December 2000, in Belgrade, Federal Republic of Yugoslavia.
