= Nikola Smiljanić =

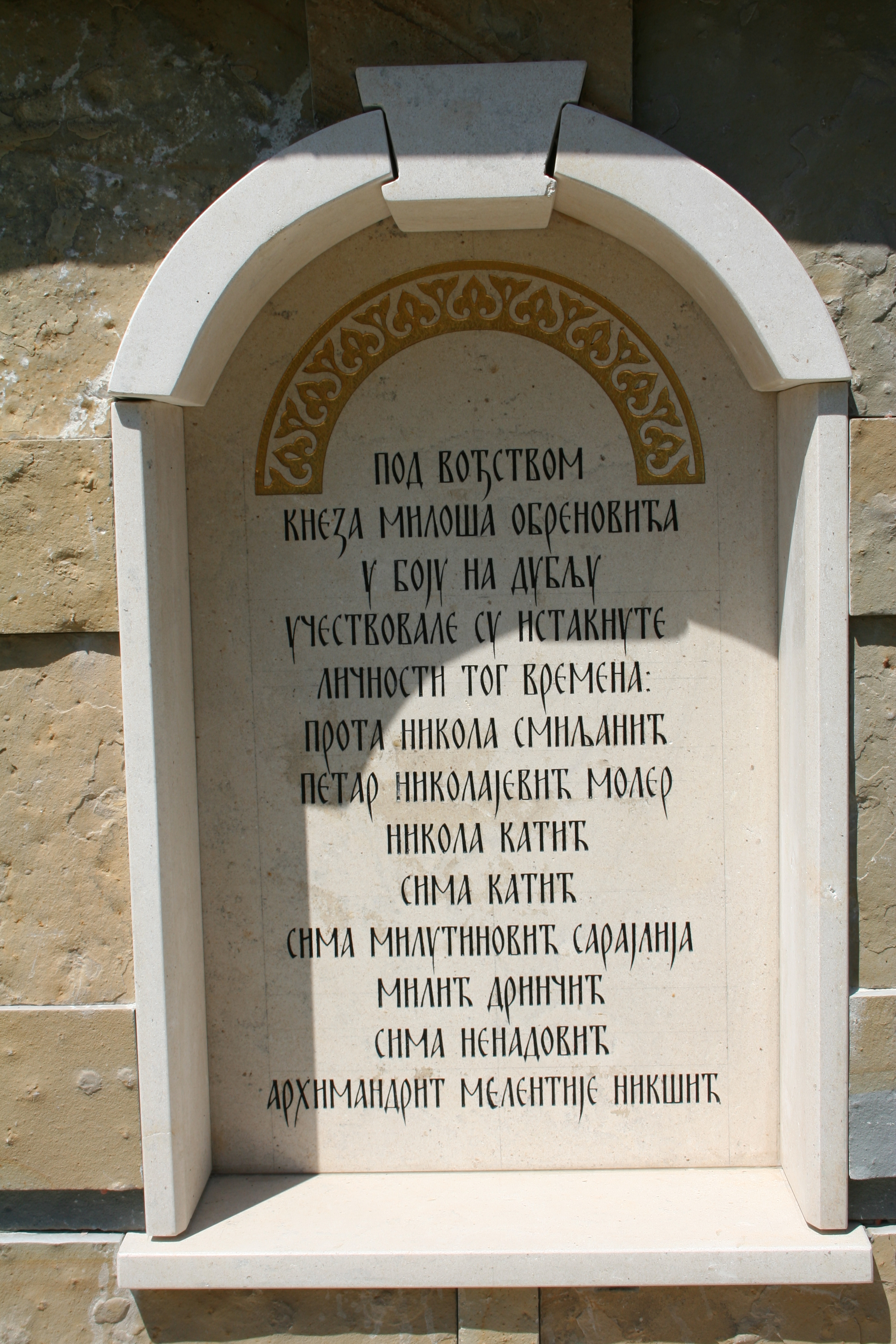
Nikola Smiljanić's name included on the monument at the Dublje church.

Nikola Smiljanić (Serbian: Никола Смиљанић; c. 1760–1815) was a Serbian Orthodox priest and revolutionary vojvoda (general) active in both the First Serbian Uprising (1804–1813) and Second Serbian Uprising (1815).

== Biography ==
Smiljanić was born in the village of Badovinci in c. 1760 and grew up in the village of Belotić and the town of Šabac. As a young man, he was adopted by Jeka Radojičina, a widow, who was engaged in trade in Šabac and who funded his education at the Orthodox seminary. Through his adoptive mother, he married Mitra, the daughter of village knez Mihailo Ružičić of Pocerski Metković, before he was ordained a deacon and priest. As a deacon, Nikola Smiljanić was a teacher in Belotić for a while before taking part in both the First Serbian Uprising (1804–1813) and Second Serbian Uprising (1815). Marko Štitarac poisoned him on the orders of Prince Miloš Obrenović for being loyal to Karađorđe and he died at Belotić. His daughter married merchant Jovan Radovanović-Ćurčija in Šabac.

== See also ==
- List of people of the First Serbian Uprising
- List of people of the Second Serbian Uprising

== Sources ==
- Milićević, Milan Đ. (1888). Поменик знаменитих људи у српског народа новијега доба. Издање Чупићеве задужбине. pp. 652–654 – via Archive.org.
