= Milisav Čamdžija =

Serbian revolutionary

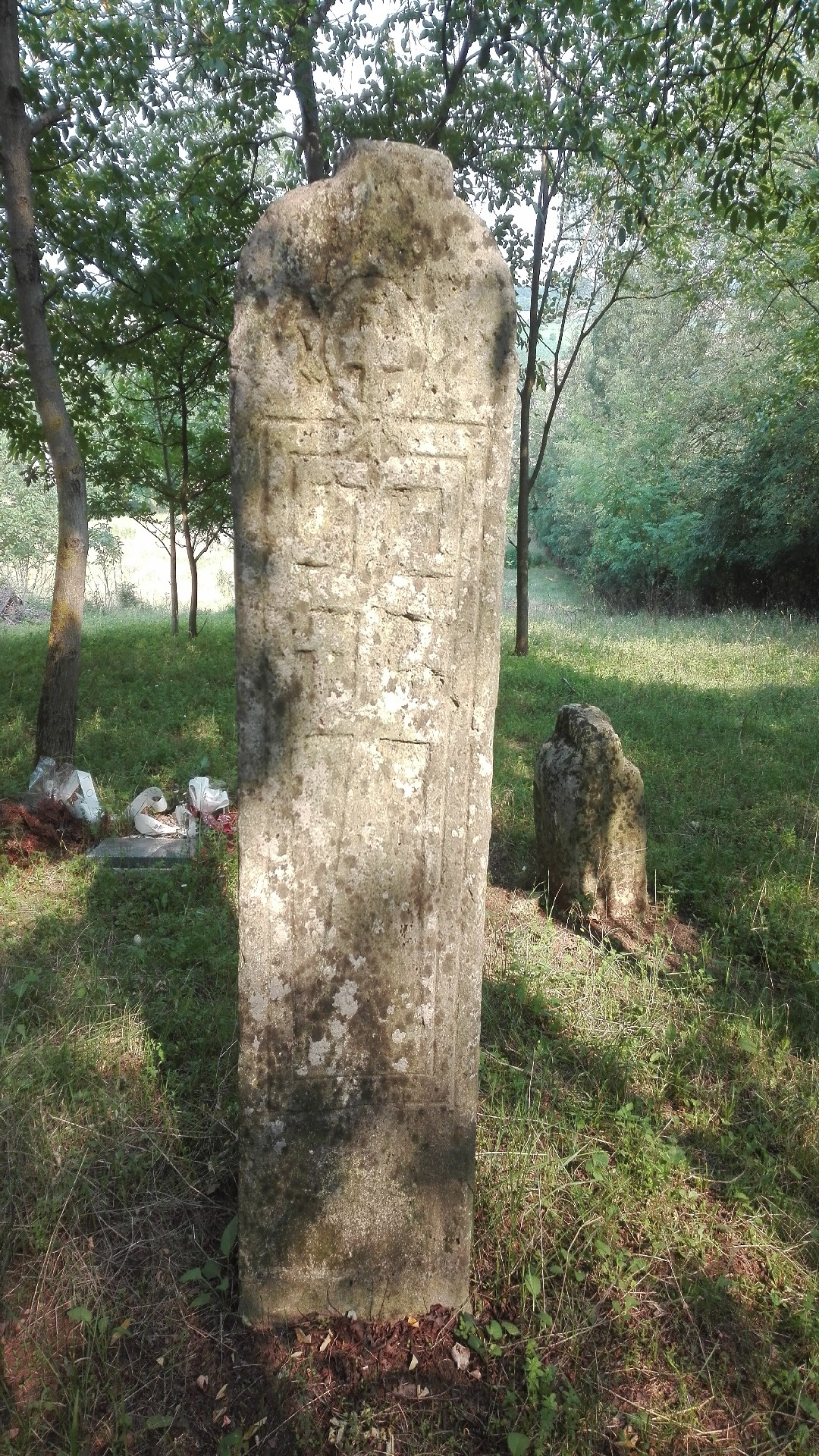
- Tombstones of Ivanko (front) and Milisav (background)
- Born: 1770s Borak, Ottoman Empire (now Serbia)
- Died: 1815; Near Palež, Revolutionary Serbia (now Serbia)
- Cause of death: Mortally wounded
- Burial place: Family orchard in Borak
- Military career
- Allegiance: Revolutionary Serbia
- Service years: 1804–1815
- Rank: kapetan (captain)
- Nickname: Čamdžija ("the Boatman")
- Unit: Belgrade unit
- Commands: Belgrade blockade line
- Known for: Heroism, liberation of Belgrade
- Conflicts: First Serbian Uprising

Milisav Ivanović (Serbian: Милисав Ивановић; 1770s–1815), known as Čamdžija (Милисав Чамџија, "the Boatman"), was a Serb revolutionary that participated in the First Serbian Uprising, fighting in the Belgrade najiha army under knez Sima Marković. He was known as a hero that sang in battle, receiving ten wounds and a hole in the jaw. He fell at the beginning of the Second Serbian Uprising. His birth village was given the prefix veliki ("great") due to the legacy of Sima Marković and his. The tombstones of Čamdžija and his brother are designated a cultural heritage monument.

== Biography ==
Ivanović was born in the village of Borak in the Belgrade nahiya (district). His paternal family settled in the village after the second Great Serbian Migration led by Patriarch Arsenije IV Jovanović Šakabenta, sparked by losses in the Austro-Turkish war, from East Herzegovina via what is today northern Montenegro. Milinko Ivanović had five sons, Ivanko, Milisav, Marko, Petar and Mateja. The family was mostly engaged in shepherding rather than agriculture, so Milisav was brought up a shepherd. He stood out from other children for his dexterity and agility, and a talent for singing. Almost all children in the area were educated by priest Stanoje or his son priest Sima in their school.

Growing up, like many in the village, he became a momak (entourage) of knez Sima Marković, and accompanied him in the cattle trade across the Sava river with the Habsburg monarchy ("Austria"). There was a ferry on the Kolubara and small port at Palež (Obrenovac), where Serbs worked as loaders, and Ivanović worked here, and became an excellent swimmer. Sima fought in the Austro-Turkish War (1788–1791) in the Serbian Free Corps. When the Austrian troops retreated and the Sava pontoon bridge was destroyed, Serbs feared Turk vengeance and many took to the dense forests of Rudnik and Medvednik. Most of the Borak population fled, and arriving at the riverbank, there were too many people and no transport. Milisav Ivanović swam and dragged a raft which was used to transport people into safety. From then on, he was known as Čamdžija, "the Boatman".

In 1793, Sima Marković was appointed the obor-knez of the Belgrade nahiya, meaning he had responsibility over the Serbs in the district and was intermediary to Belgrade Vizier Hadji Mustafa Pasha (t. 1793–1801). Hadji Mustafa Pasha was murdered by the Janissaries in 1801.

Following the Slaughter of the Knezes, which Sima Marković survived, notable Serbs of the Belgrade and Kragujevac nahiyas held a secret assembly at Orašac on 15 February 1804 where it was decided to rise up against the renegade Janissaries known as the Dahije. The elected leader, Karađorđe, sent Sima to rally in the region. Sima sent Čamdžija with a band to burn down the inn at Vranić in the early days of the uprising. Since the start of the uprising, Čamdžija fought under and accompanied Sima Marković everywhere. He was said to be unwilling to govern and gain titles, all he really wanted was to defeat and disperse the Turks. He acquired the rank of kapetan (captain) by training new soldiers in the handling of weapons and military skills. On 15 August 1805 the Serbian rebel leadership held an assembly at Borak, where the Serbian Governing Council was established.

Karađorđe and Čamdžija led the first charge that led to the liberation of Belgrade. Karađorđe chose Čamdžija to accompany him for his exemplary valor. During the charge, Čamdžija reportedly climbed up and sat on an Ottoman cannon and sang loudly to raise morale, with mortally wounded Vasa Čarapić hearing this and rallying his men in his last words.

Čamdžija survived the Ottoman suppression of the first uprising in 1813. He joined the Second Serbian Uprising under knez and vojvoda Miloš Obrenović and fought at Palež, where he was mortally wounded and taken to his village where he died after two days. He was buried in his family orchard under a walnut tree, next to his brother Ivanko. He explicitly wanted his tombstone to be smaller than that of his brother's. The tombstones are designated a cultural heritage monument.

Čamdžija received ten wounds in battle, including a hole in the lower jaw which made it impossibly to eat čorba (stew/soup), and the loss of teeth made him murmur, although it didn't stop him from singing loudly in battle. He was described as brown-haired, of small build, "judging by his body no one would ever believe that he was such a hero as he indeed was". Petar Jokić called him an "immortal hero" (besmrtna junačina). The village of Borak was given the prefix veliki ("great") due to the legacy of Sima Marković and Milisav Čamdžija.

Locals hold memorial gatherings in honor of him on 13 December, the slava (feast day) of St. Andrew.

== See also ==
- List of people of the First Serbian Uprising
- List of people of the Second Serbian Uprising

== Sources ==
- Milićević, Milan Đ. (1888). Поменик знаменитих људи у српског народа новијега доба. Издање Чупићеве задужбине – via Archive.org.
- Nedeljković, Milena (2015). Крст у времену. Београд: Центар за културу Барајево. p. 153. ISBN 978-86-80466-00-2.
- Nenadović, Konstantin N. (1884). Живот и дела великог Ђорђа Петровића Кара-Ђорђа. Vol. II (1 ed.). Vienna: У Штампарији Јована Н. Вернаја – via Google Books.
- Nenadović, Konstantin N. (1903) [1883]. Живот и дела великог Ђорђа Петровића Кара-Ђорђа. Vol. I (2 ed.). Belgrade: Штампа Савића и Комп. – via Archive.org.
- Sibinović, Ana (2016), Надгробни споменик Милисава Чамџије [Tombstone of Milisav Čamdžija] (PDF), Завод за заштиту споменика културе града Београда - установа културе од националног значаја, ISBN 978-86-89779-29-5
- Vasiljević, Radmila (2018). Милисав Чамџија [Milisav Čamdžija]. Фабула Ностра, Београд. pp. 3–6. ISBN 978-86-80762-08-1.
- Martinović, Vida; Milićević, Jovan; Tomić, Radovan (1962). "Милисав Чамџија". Лазаревац и околина. Književne novine.
- Савез Срба из региона (19 December 2022). "МИЛИСАВ ЧАМЏИЈА НИЈЕ ЗАБОРАВЉЕН: Помен ослободиоцу Београда у Великом Борку". Савез Срба из региона.
