= Battle of Rudnik (1815) =

Battle of the Second Serbian Uprising

- Part of the Second Serbian Uprising
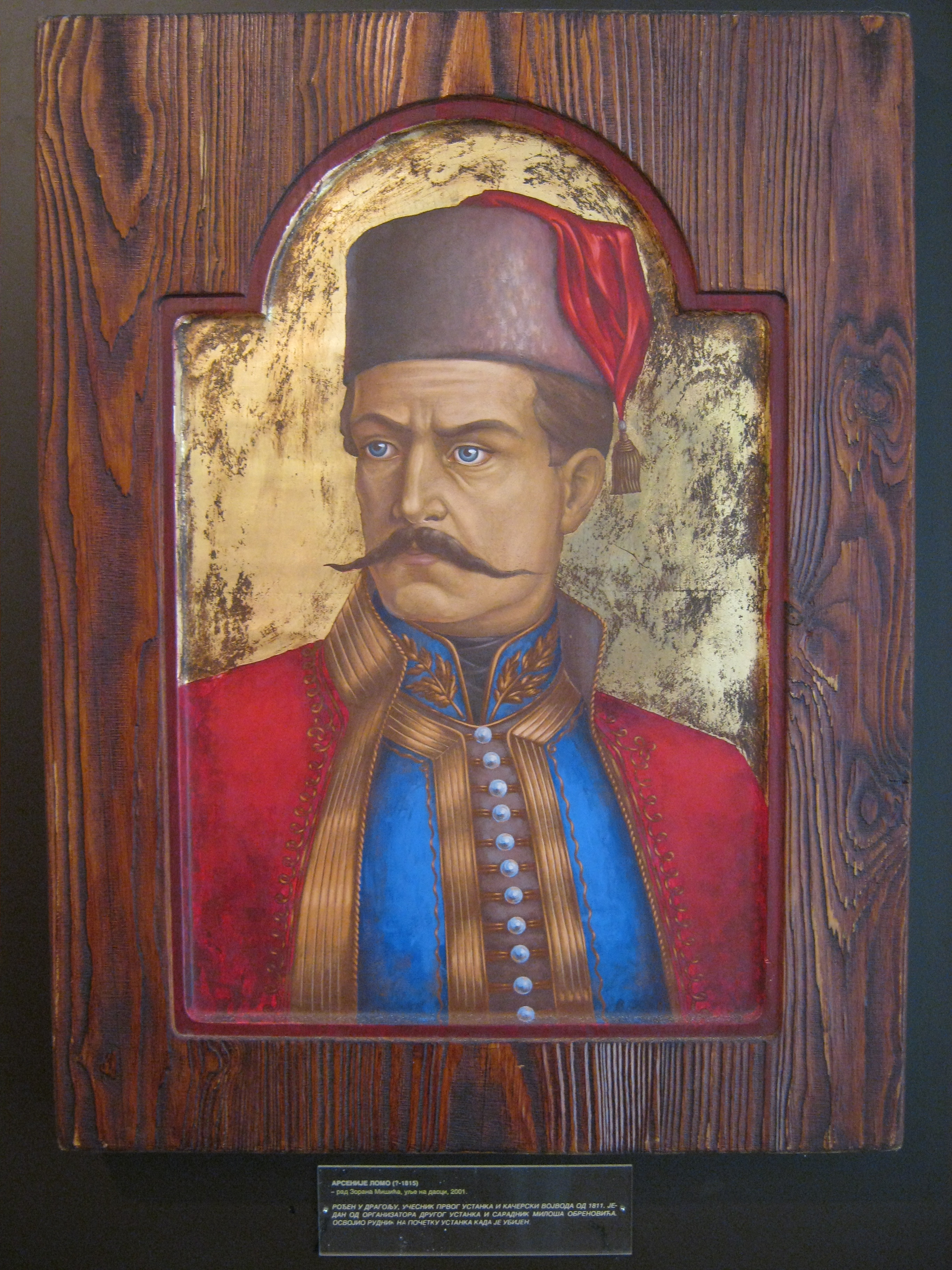
- Arsenije Loma led the siege of Rudnik
Date	23–26 April 1815
Location	Rudnik, Ottoman Empire (today Serbia)
Result	Serbian victory
Territorial changes	Rudnik handed over to the rebels

Belligerents
Serbian rebels	Ottoman Empire

Commanders and leaders
Arsenije Loma X (DOW)	Tokatlić-aga X

Units involved
Kačer knežina	Rudnik deli and local soldiers

The Battle of Rudnik (Serbian: Бој на Руднику/Boj na Rudniku) was undertaken by the Serbian rebel unit led by Arsenije Loma against the town of Rudnik, in the hands of the Ottoman Empire, in April 1815 in the prelude of general uprising. Rudnik was the centre of the Rudnik nahija in the main rebel territory of Šumadija in the previous uprising. Loma had participated in the takeover of Rudnik in 1804.

Perhaps on the same day as the Takovo Meeting (23 April 1815), the vojvoda of Kačer, Arsenije Loma, took his men to Rudnik and attacked the fortification. Contemporary Vuk Karadžić claims that it was done already prior to the meeting, and Loma's absence from it points to this. Loma had in the days prior killed haraçlı (tax-collectors) in Jasenica and collected men in Kačer to attack the Rudnik town (varoš). The bulk of Rudnik soldiers accompanied Ašin-beg who at the time was escorted to Kamenica or Užice nahiya by Miloš Obrenović. Loma set houses on fire and encircled the fortification. The Rudnik "Turks" of the town fled into the fortification when Loma arrived, and Loma then dispersed the Rudnik Turks and took over the fortification after three days of fighting. The Rudnik Turks realized that they couldn't withstand the attack and surrendered, they were also out of food. Loma accepted their surrender, and took upon himself to safely escort the notable yerli (natives) to the Ottoman city of Užice, after swearing oath "on bread and salt" with mutesellim (mayor) Tokatlić-aga. They immediately set out in that same morning.

Loma led a group of 30 or 70 Turks and arrived at Bukvik, where his younger brother Mihailo had 50 men waiting in ambush; Loma and his momci (bodyguards) were let past and the Turks were shot in a fusillade with muskets, with Tokatlić-aga and 26 of his men killed, only Tokatlić's nephew and bayraktar (flag-bearer) and another left alive. Loma was unaware of his brother's plans, as he had left him to hold Rudnik. Tokatlić managed to kill one Serbian after falling fatally wounded from his horse, and Loma returned fire on the ambuscade, and then realized what had happened. Loma decided to escort the survivors, as he had sworn oath, and after crossing Zlatica, Tokatlić's nephew gifted him his yatagan, and when Loma put it in his belt, he shot him with a hidden flintlock and rode on his noble horse on the road to Užice. According to K. Nenadović, it was the bayraktar who gifted his beautiful sabre, as thanks for saving at least them and being unaware of the ambush, and when putting it in his belt, he was shot in the head by the same and rode away on his dark horse to Užice with the two survivors. The rebels killed the two, but the bayraktar managed to Užice. M. Milićević has yet another version.

Loma was breathing but unresponsive and taken to the kmet (serf) Raka's house in the Bare village where he they cared for him a couple of days, until he died.

== See also ==
- Timeline of the Serbian Revolution
- Serbian Army (revolutionary)
- List of Serbian Revolutionaries

== Annotations ==
1. Tokatlić and 30 families were escorted, and the ambush was made by Martinović from Bosuta. Tokatlić's nephew shot Loma and rode to Užice.

== Sources ==
- Milićević, Milan Đ. (1888). Поменик знаменитих људи у српског народа новијега доба [Memory Book]. Издање Чупићеве задужбине – via Archive.org.
- Nenadović, Konstantin N. (1884). Живот и дела великог Ђорђа Петровића Кара-Ђорђа [Life and Deeds of Great Đorđe Petrović Kara-Đorđe]. Vol. II (1 ed.). Vienna: У Штампарији Јована Н. Вернаја – via Google Books.
- Nenadović, Konstantin N. (1903) [1883]. Живот и дела великог Ђорђа Петровића Кара-Ђорђа [Life and Deeds of Great Đorđe Petrović Kara-Đorđe]. Vol. I (2 ed.). Belgrade: Штампа Савића и Комп. – via Archive.org.
- Protić, Kosta (1891). "Ратни догађаји из другог српског устанка, год. 1815". Годишњица Николе Чупића. XXXI. Državna štamparija: 1–104 – via Google Books.
