= Veliki Borak =

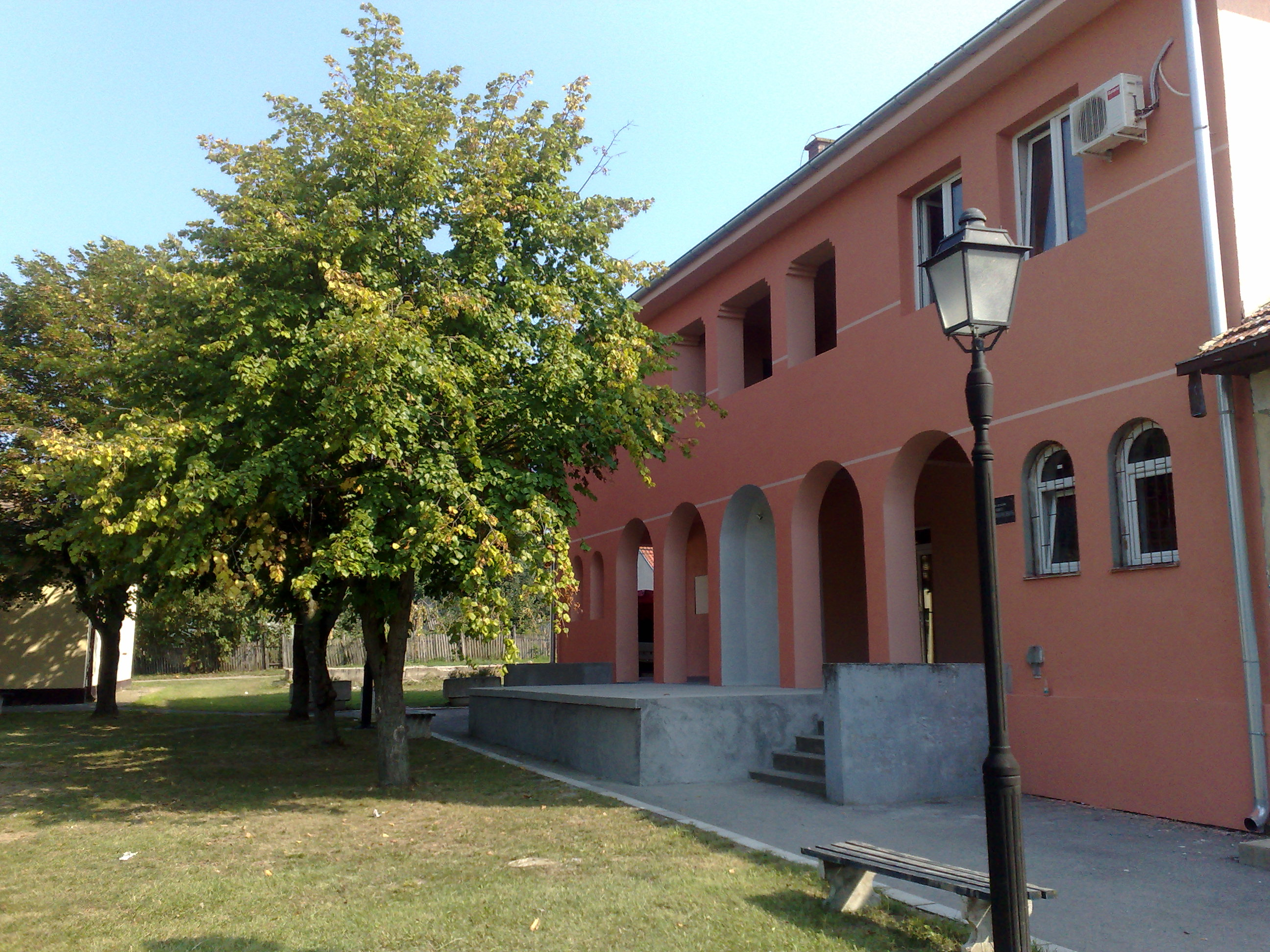

- Location within Serbia
- Coordinates: 44°32′18″N 20°21′04″E
- Country: Serbia
- District: Belgrade
- Settlement: Veliki Borak

Area
  - Total: 17.12 km^{2} (6.61 sq mi)

Population (2012)
  - Total: 1,287
  - Density: 75.18/km^{2} (194.7/sq mi)
- Time zone: UTC+1
- Postal code: 11.462
- Area code: 011

Veliki Borak (Serbian Cyrillic: Велики Борак) is a suburban settlement of Belgrade, the capital of Serbia. It is located in the municipality of Barajevo.

== Location ==
Veliki Borak is located in the western part of the municipality, southwest of the municipal seat of Barajevo and 4 km east of the Ibarska magistrala (Highway of Ibar), but near the Belgrade-Bar railway.

== History ==
In the period of the First Serbian Uprising (1804-1813), this region produced many well-known names, among which the most famous ones are the knez Sima Marković and the hero Milisav Čamdžija, who was the first among the rebels to enter the Belgrade fortress. The first National assembly in modern Serbian history was held in Veliki Borak in 1805. In this assembly, the Serbian Governing Council was established, as the first organ of executive authority in Serbia. The priest Matija Nenadović was elected as the first President, and the Councilor of Belgrade district was Pavle Popović from Vranić.

According to the local, oral tradition, the very first post office in Serbia was opened in Veliki Borak, being operational while the assembly and the council were seated in the village. It was located in the Milovanović house which was built just prior to the uprising, in 1802. At the time, the post delivery system was known as the "Tatar-menzil hane" network. The fast horsemen who delivered the mail were called Tatars, while the postal stations in between were called menzil hane, or menzulane in Serbian rendering.

While the existence of the proper post office on such important location during the uprising, which would allow fast communication with the other, local rebel centers, the national postal service "Pošta Srbije" claims there are no written records to confirm that the post office was opened in Veliki Borak at the time. The company claims that the first post office was opened in the Knez Mihailova Street, in downtown Belgrade, in 1840.

As of 2022, the Milovanović house still stands, it is inhabited, and was renovated that year. It is built in the typical Serbian style of the day, with rock foundation and earthen walls. Despite claiming it has no records to confirm the 1800s post office in the village, the "Pošta Srbije" tried to purchase the Milovanović house, but the owners refused. Instead, the modern post office building, which is some 400 metres (1,300 ft) away from the house, was also fully renovated in 2022, and part of it was adapted into the permanent exhibition of some postal artefacts, as a department of the central Post Office Museum.

== Characteristics ==
In Veliki Borak, there is the Church of St. George the Great Martyr, which was built during the tenure of priest Goran Rakić, who serves as a priest in Veliki Borak and Šiljakovac.

It is a rural settlement, with a population of 1,287 (Census 2002).
