= Battle of Požarevac (1815) =

Battle of the Second Serbian Uprising

- Part of Second Serbian Uprising
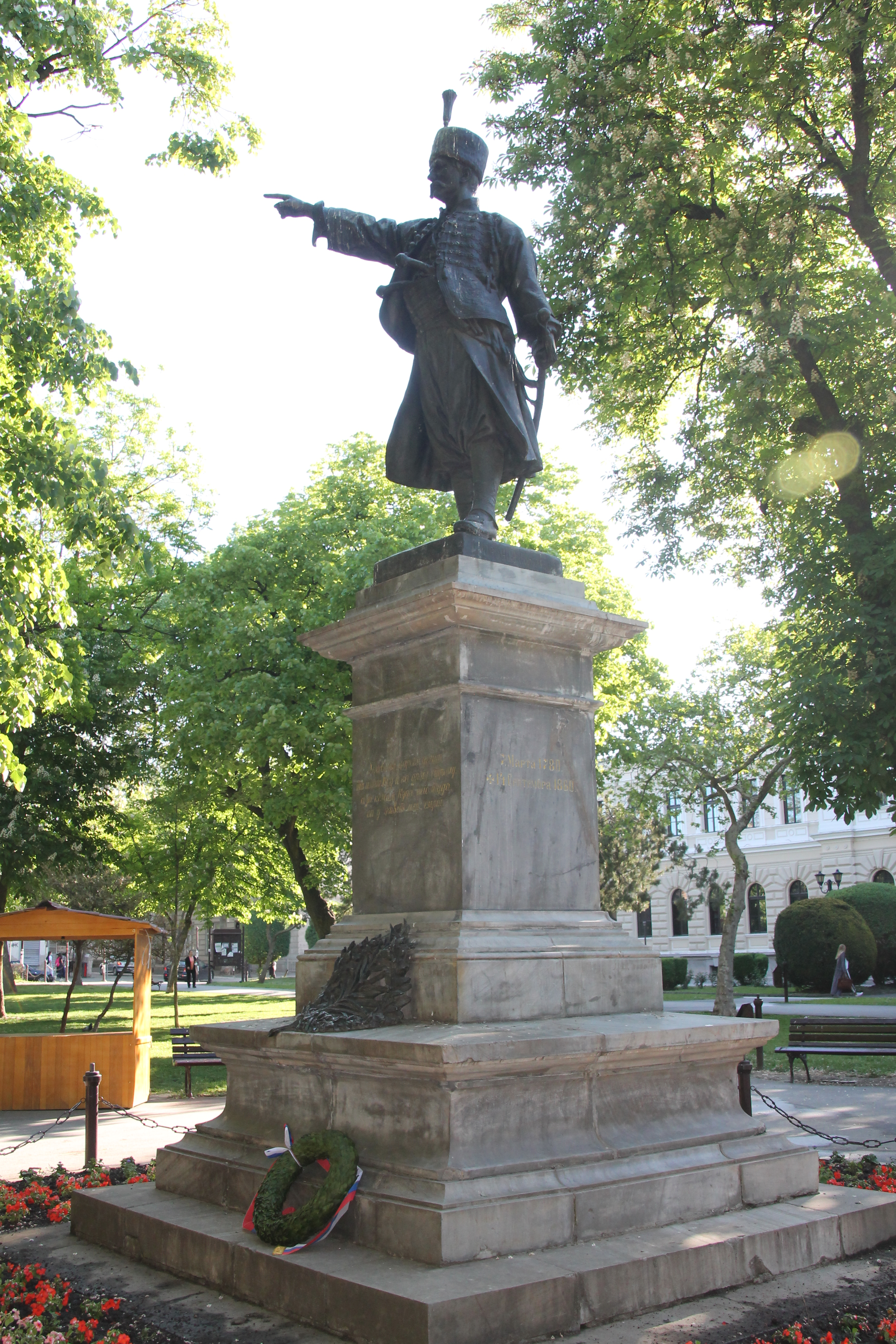
- Monument to the Serb revolutionary and commander Miloš Obrenović in Požarevac, erected in gratitude for the liberation of Požarevac and Serbia
Date	1 July – 7 July 1815 (6 days)
Location	Požarevac, Sanjak of Smederevo, Ottoman Empire
Result	Serbian victory

Belligerents
Serbian rebels	Ottoman Empire

Commanders and leaders
Miloš Obrenović; Jovan Vukomanović †	Asan-delibasha †

Strength
12,000	1,900 Turks and 2,000 Arnauts

Casualties and losses
Unknown	Unknown; One captured cannon

The Battle of Požarevac (Serbian Cyrillic: Битка код Пожаревца, Bitka kod Požarevca) took place during the Second Serbian Uprising between the Serbian Revolutionaries and Ottoman forces at Požarevac, Sanjak of Smederevo from 1 July to 7 July 1815. It ended with the Serbian victory.

== Battle ==
After the liberation of Čačak, Serb revolutionary and commander Miloš Obrenović set out with a large army of 12,000 insurgents to liberate Požarevac. Miloš was informed that a large army was gathering around Požarevac and that the Ottoman Turks were being assisted by the delibaša of Vidin's vizier along with 1900 deli troops, who had made six trenches and had one cannon. On the way to Požarevac in Batočina, Miloš found a trench with 2000 Arnauts. There, the insurgents fought with the Arnauts, but the Arnauts surrendered after three days. Then, after this victory, the insurgents crossed the Morava and headed towards Požarevac.

On the way to Požarevac, Miloš and the insurgents ran into the deli troops. The Serbs immediately started fighting the delis, but at one point they hesitated, seeing how fiercely the delis fought. Miloš then launched an attack on the delis on his personal initiative. He rushed on horseback towards Asan-delibaša, addressing him with the words: "Delibasha, you may have a place on the other side, but I really have no place other than here, dead or alive." The insurgents then defeated the delis who retreated to the trenches. On the first day, the Serbs took the first trench with a charge, then in the next two days the next two trenches, while the Turks fled the large trench with the cannon and two small trenches next to the church and the mosque. Miloš then sent his scribe with a proposal that the Turks surrender and leave the pocket and the cannon, and that he would get a safe passage to Turkey. During the battle, Jovan Vukomanović, the brother-in-law of Prince Miloš and the brother of Princess Ljubica, was killed.

== Legacy ==
- The battle was screened in the Serbian TV series Vuk Karadžić. The series shows the battle between Serbian Revolutionary infantrymen and cavalrymen and the Ottoman Turks, and the scene in which Miloš Obrenović on horseback attacks Asan-delibaša with his famous words.
- Anastas Jovanović made a lithograph, "Prince Miloš in Battle", in which Prince Miloš is shown with the insurgents fighting against the Ottoman Turks on horseback. The lithograph, together with the lithograph "Karađorđe in color", was published in the monograph of Anastas Jovanović in the residence of Princess Ljubica.
- Princess Ljubica planted two apple trees at the spot where her brother Jovan Vukomanović died on the battlefield.
- The epic Serbian folk song Boj na Požarevcu was written in honour of the Serbian victory.
