= Belotić (Osečina) =

Belotić Белотић
- Village (Selo)
- Location within Serbia
- Coordinates: 44°23′N 19°32′E
- Country: Serbia
- District: Kolubara
- Municipality: Osečina
- Time zone: UTC+1 (CET)
  - Summer (DST): UTC+2 (CEST)

Belotić is a village located in Osečina Municipality, Kolubara District, Serbia.

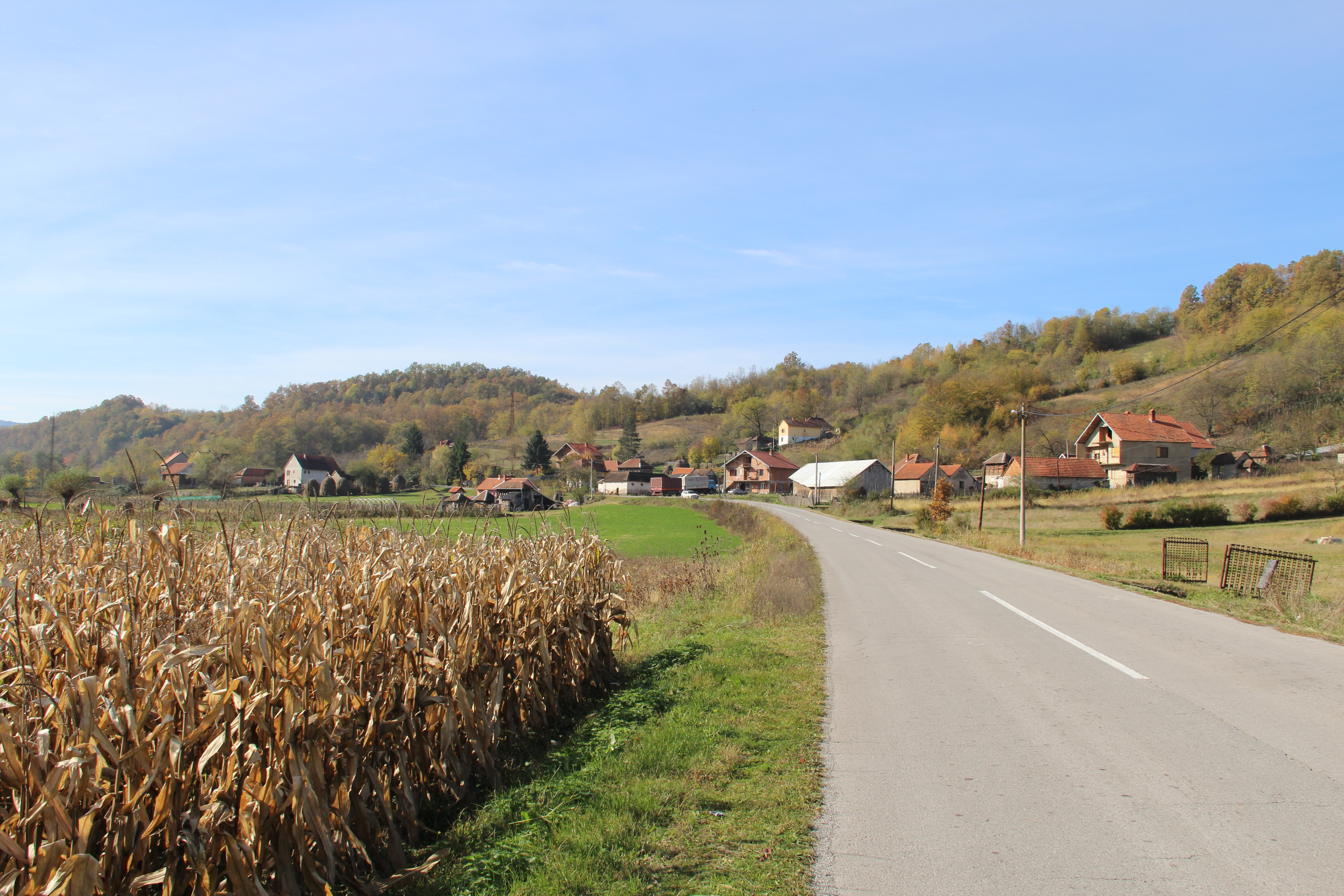
Belotić - panorama

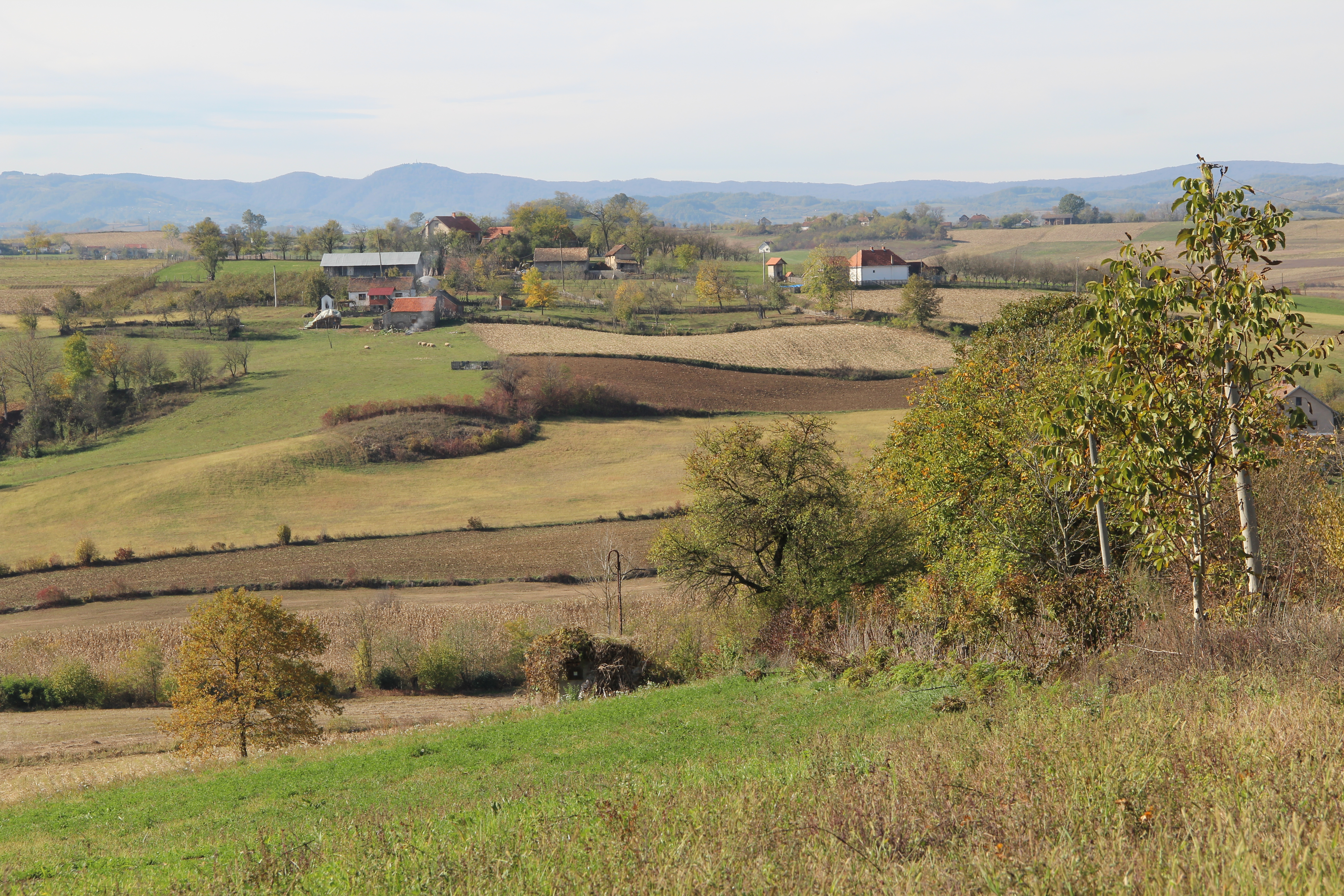
Belotić - panorama

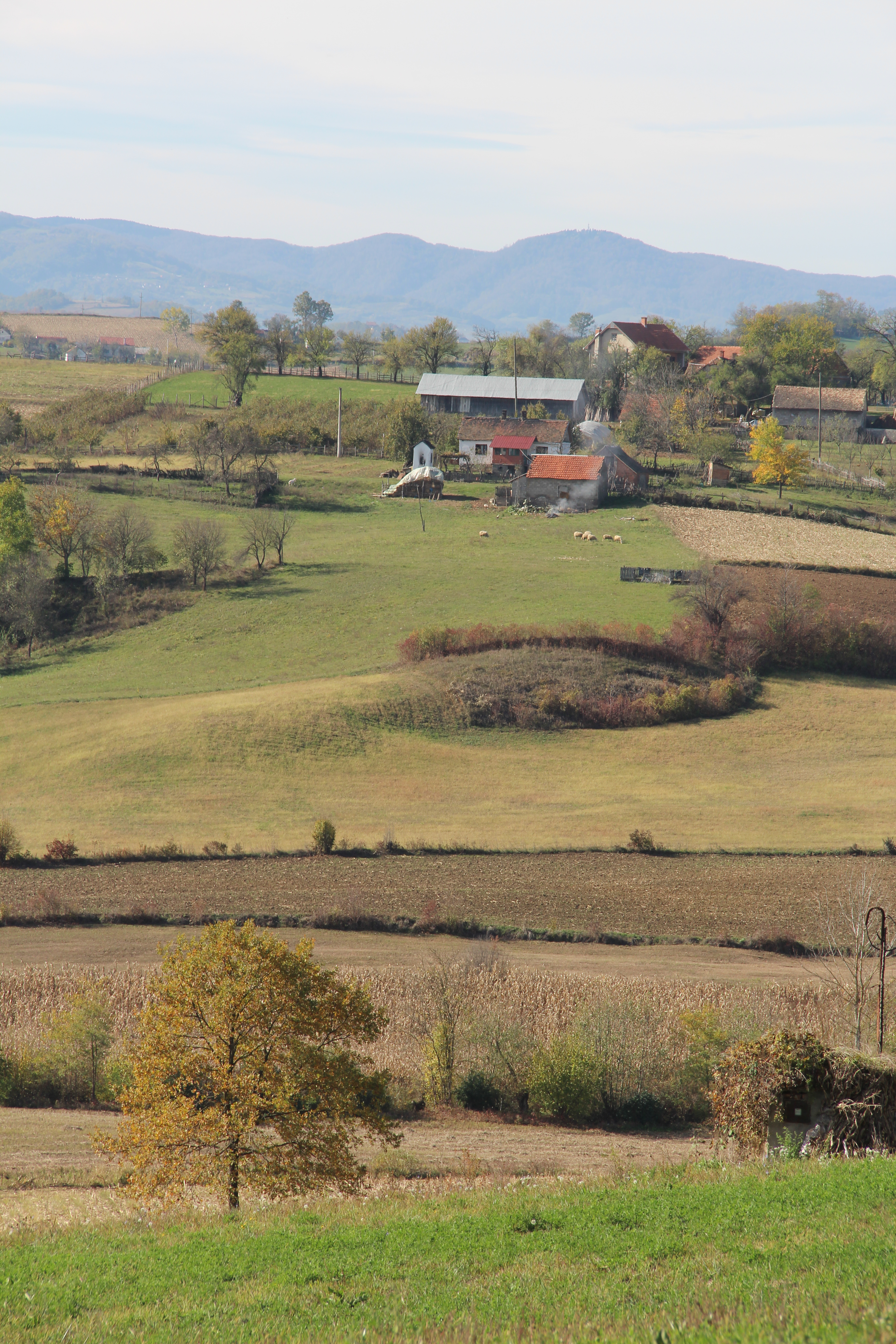
Belotić - panorama

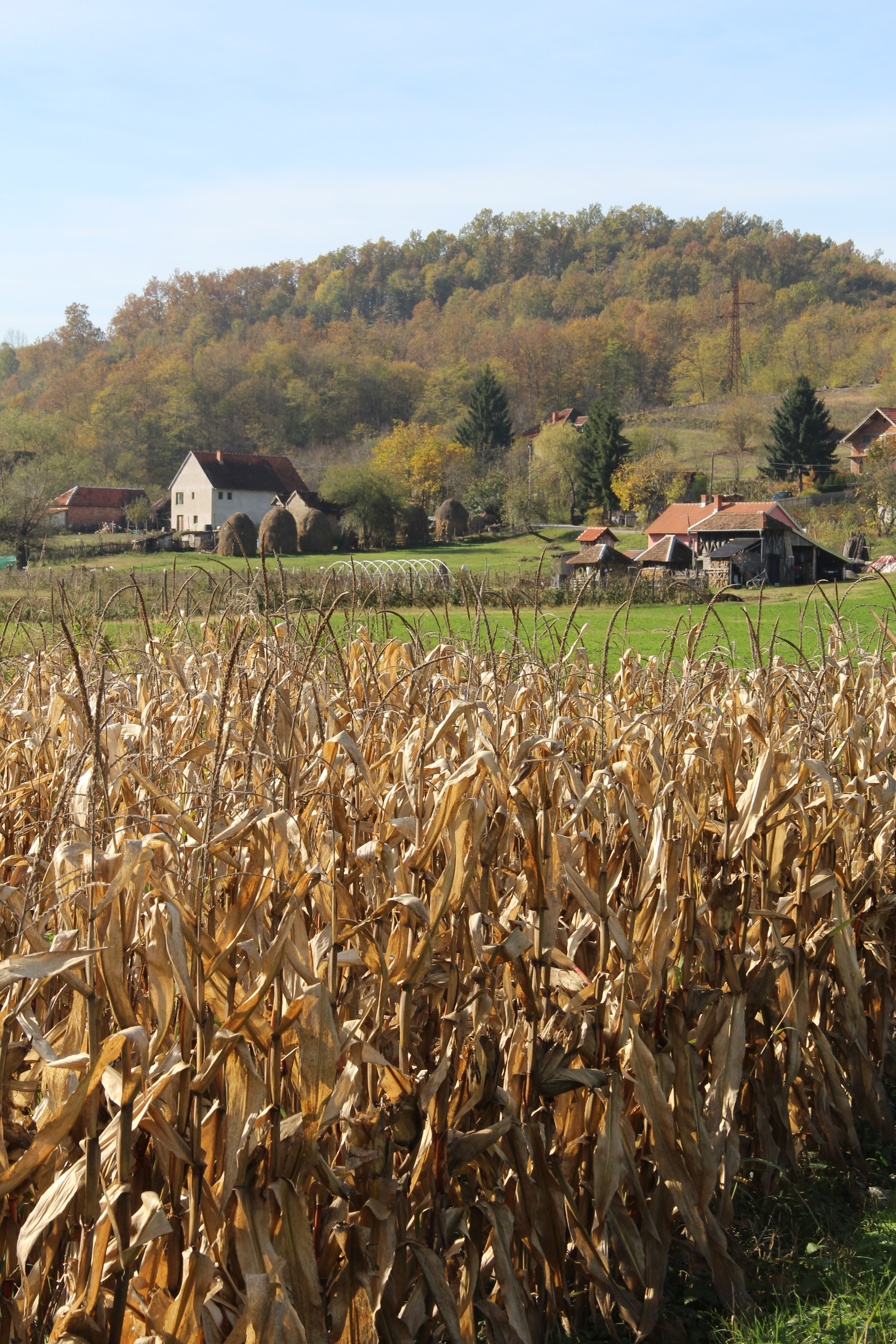
Belotić - panorama

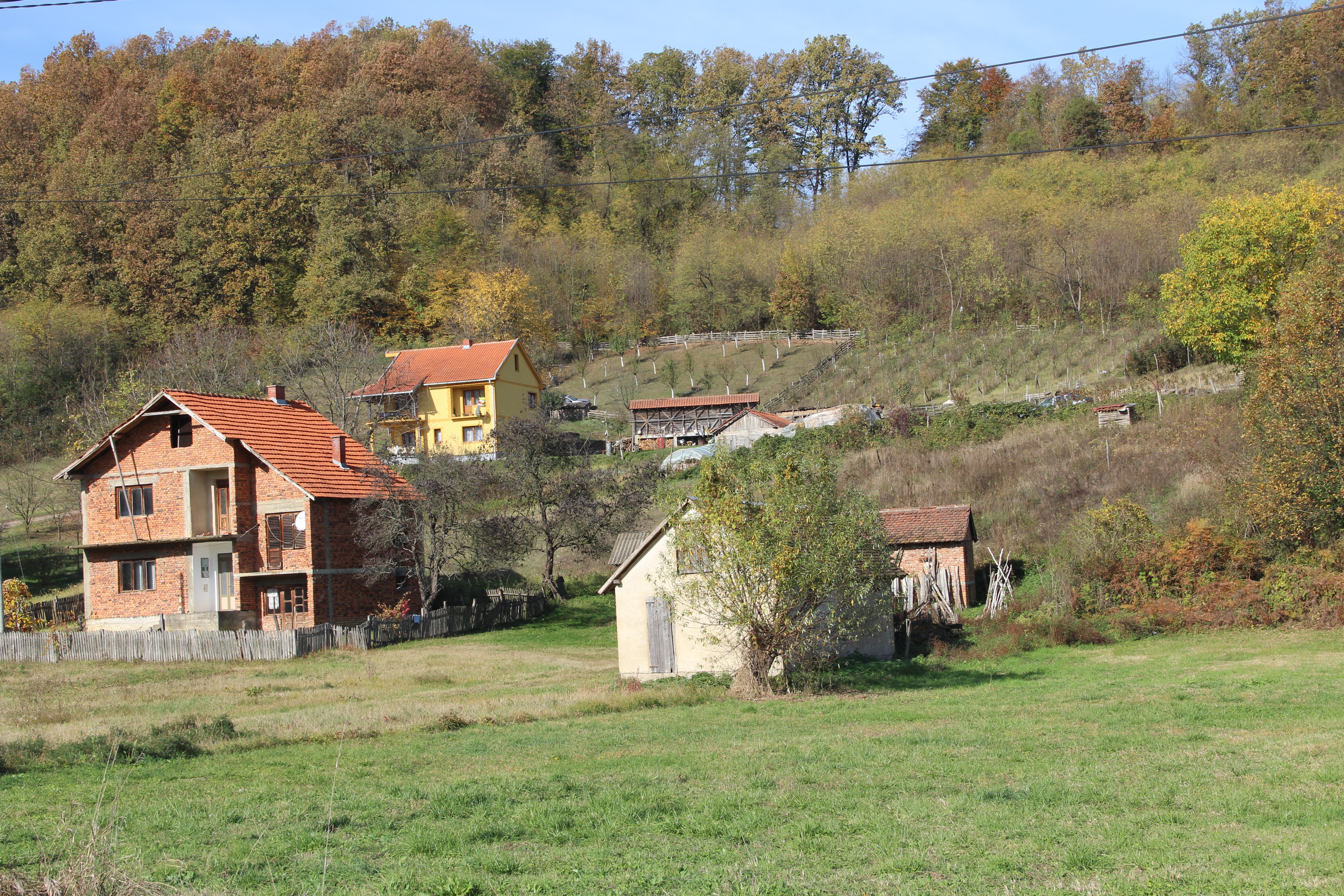
Belotić - panorama

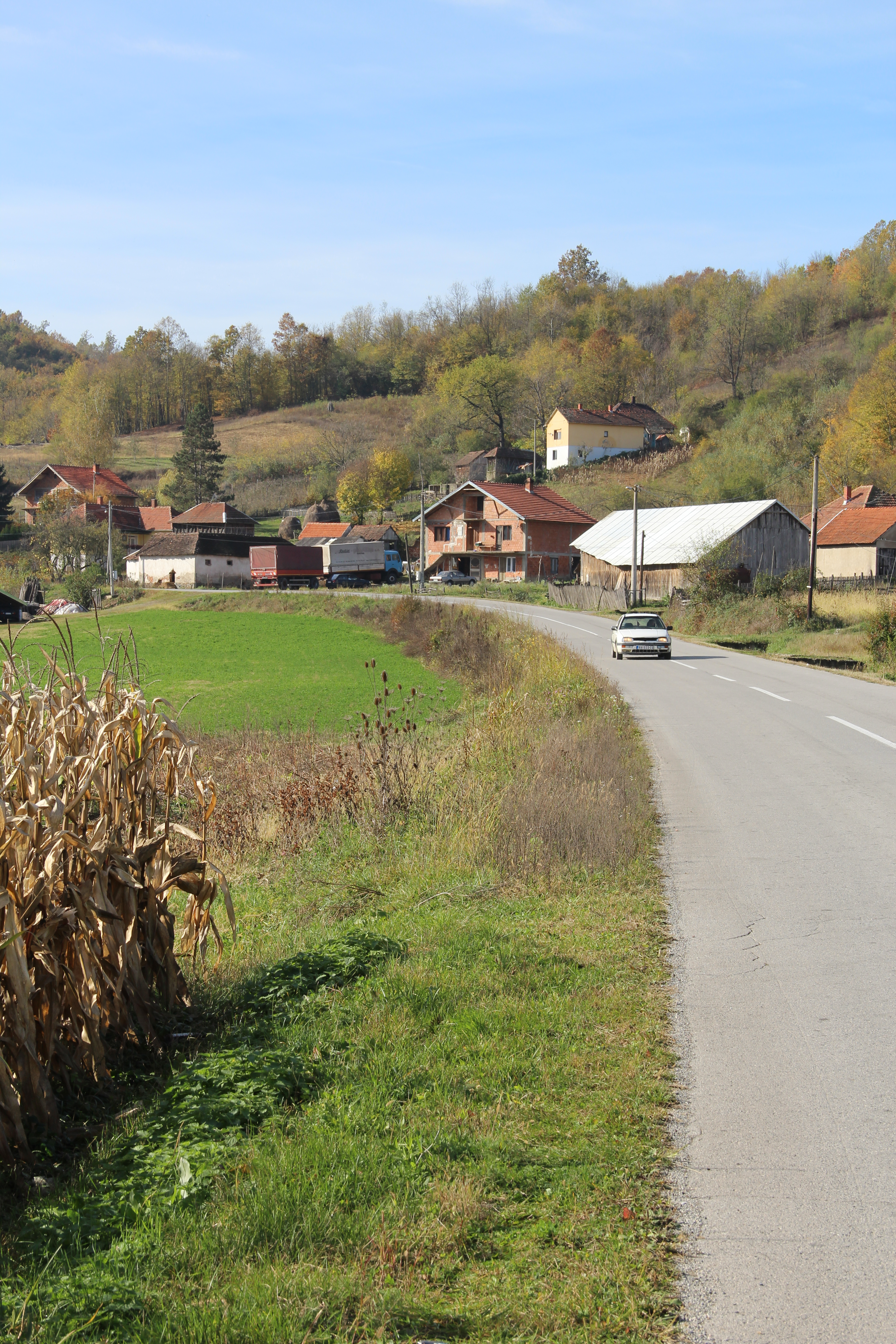
Belotić - panorama

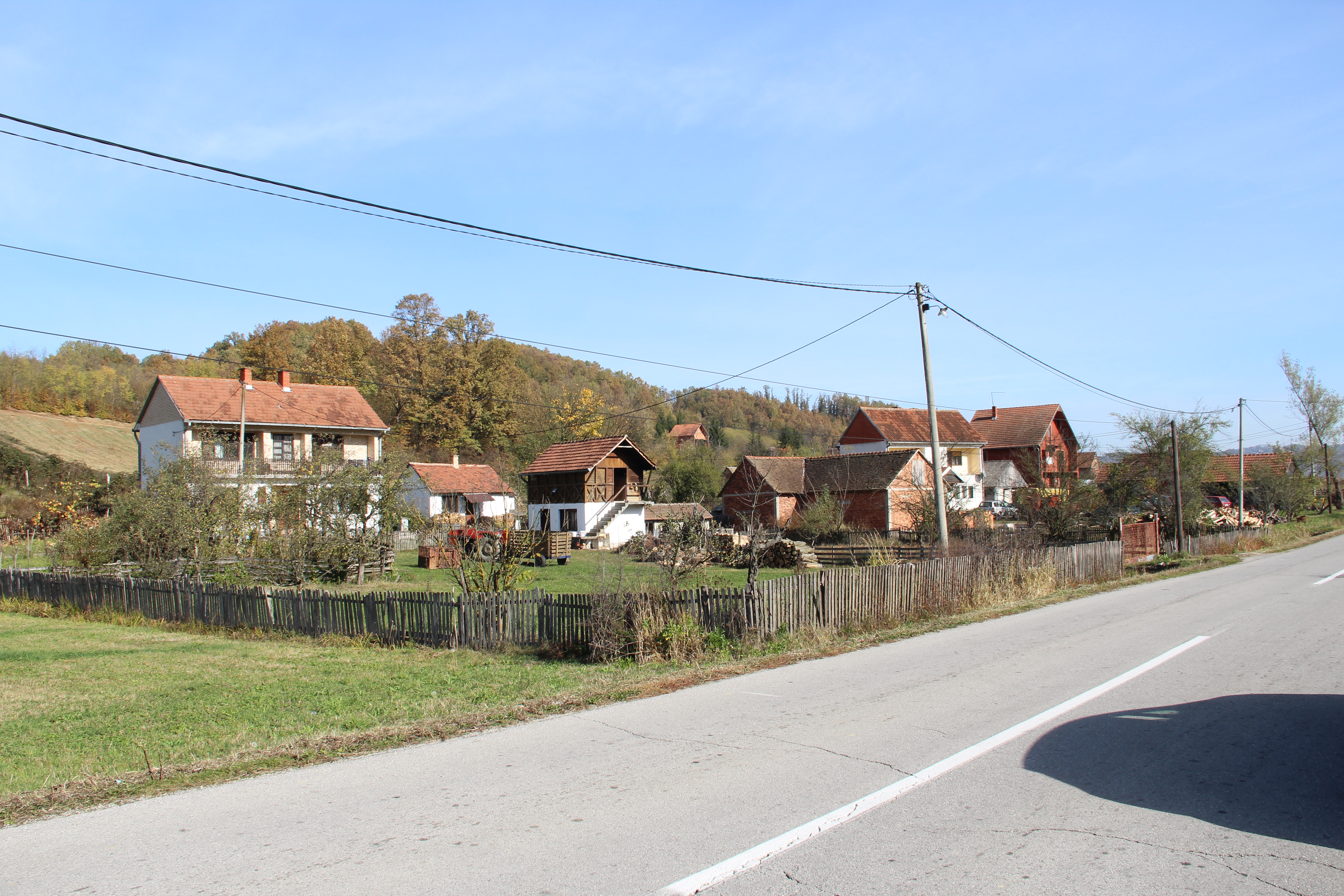
Belotić - panorama
