= Sima Marković (revolutionary) =

Serbian duke (1768–1817)

Voivode Sima Marković

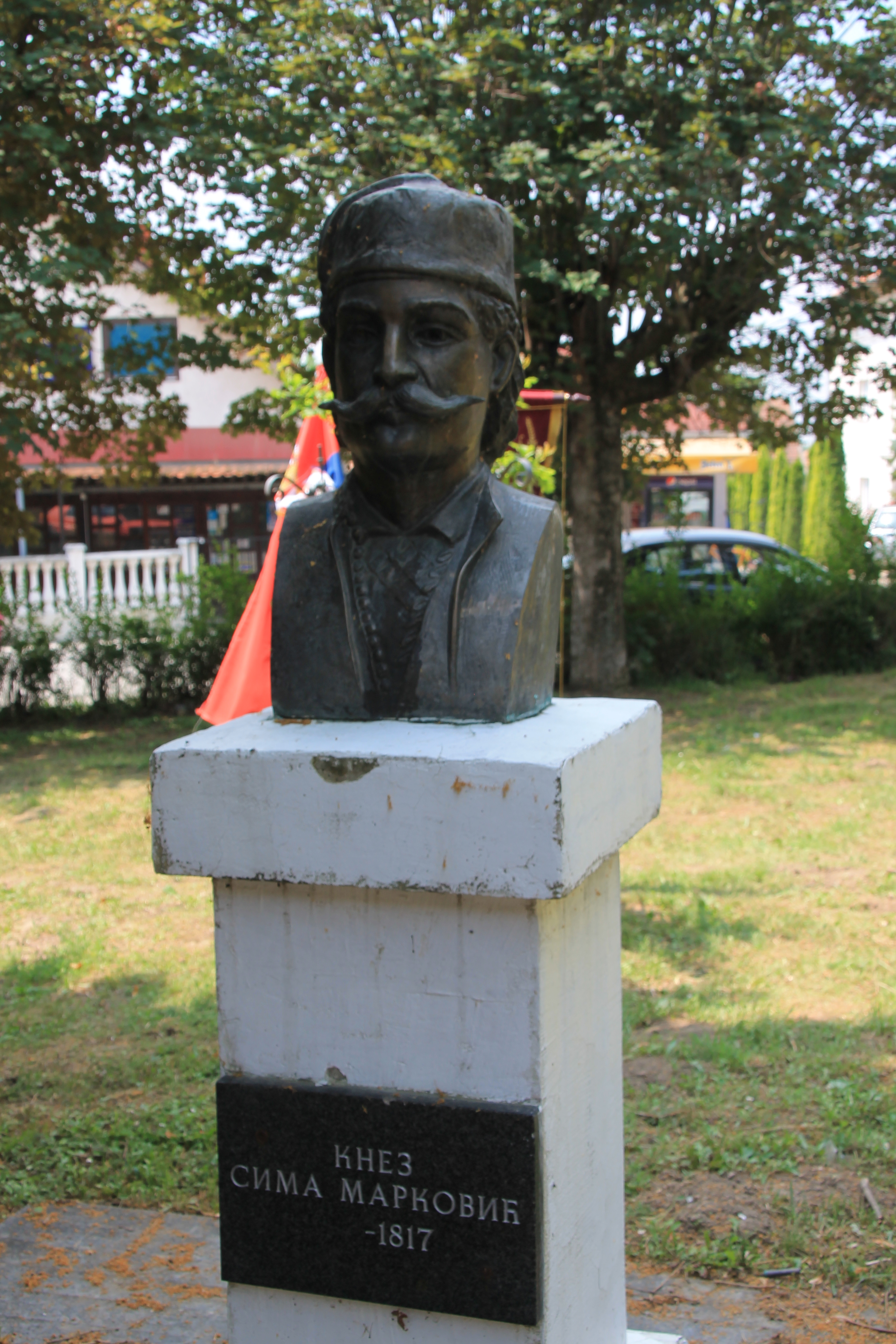
Monument of Marković in Veliki Borak

Sima Marković (Veliki Borak, 1768 – Belgrade, 22 March 1817) was a Serbian voivode who led his men in the First Serbian Uprising. He was one of four leaders of the Belgrade Nahiya along with Pavle Popović, Nikola Nikolajević, and Milisav Čamdžija.

== Biography ==
Marković was a prominent statesman, member and president of the Governing State Council of Serbia (he became president on Assumption Day in 1805). He was the Obor-knez of the Sanjak of Smederevo, also known as the Pashalik of Belgrade Nahiya in 1793. He was also a participant in Kočina Krajina. In the First Serbian Uprising, he led the army in Ivankovac, Mišar, Deligrad, in the liberation of Smederevo and Čokešina. The army of Prince Sima Marković was the first to enter the city of Belgrade on 13 December 1806, during the liberation of Belgrade from the Turks. He became the trustee of the People's Treasury, that is, the first Minister of Finance in 1811. With Dragić Gorunović and Pavle Cukić, he raised an uprising against Prince Miloš Obrenović and the Turks in 1817, but the uprising was suppressed, and he was captured and executed by Marashli Ali Pasha at Kalemegdan, on the day of the Forty Martyrs of Sebaste (Mladence).

Streets in Belgrade, Smederevo and Kragujevac and the street leading to his birthplace, as well as the elementary school in Barajevo, are named after him. "Days of Prince Sima Marković" have been organized in Veliki Borak for more than four decades, at the end of August.

== See also ==
- List of Serbian Revolutionaries

== Sources ==
- Радмила Васиљевић, "Војевање и страдање кнеза Симе Марковића", 1804, 10 (14)

Government offices
Preceded by Post established	Minister of Finance of Serbia; 1811–1813	Succeeded by Koca Marković
