= Jovan Vukomanović =

Jovan Vukomanović (Serbian: Јован Вукомановић; 1784–1815) from Srezojevci, (Rudnik nahiya), was the brother of Princess Ljubica Obrenović, and a leading participant in the first and the Second Serbian Uprising.

== Biography ==
During the First Serbian Uprising (1804–1813), the town of Požarevac was part of the Karađorđe's Serbia. At the end of the uprising in 1813, the town came briefly once more under direct Ottoman control. It was there that Prince Miloš Obrenović raised an insurrection against the Ottoman Empire. In 1815 Požarevac came under Turkish attack. At the beginning of the battle, commanding officer Vukomanović, the brother-in-law of Prince Miloš, who led the Serbs to victory was mortally wounded. It was one of the most significant armed engagements between the Ottoman army and Serbian revolutionary forces that resulted in a peace treaty between the Ottoman Empire on one side and Serbia on the other. Thereafter, the town became part of the autonomous Ottoman Principality of Serbia.

In 1868, Serbia managed to extricate itself from the Ottomans altogether.

== Sources ==
- Milan Đ. Milićević, Pomenik znamenitih ljudi u srpskog narodu novijega doba, Vols. 1 & 2 (Belgrade, 1888)
- Milan Đ. Milićević,Kneževina Srbija (Belgrade, 1878)

== See also ==
- List of Serbian Revolutionaries
