= Belotić (Bogatić) =

Belotić Белотић (Serbian) Mačvanski Belotić
- Village (Selo)
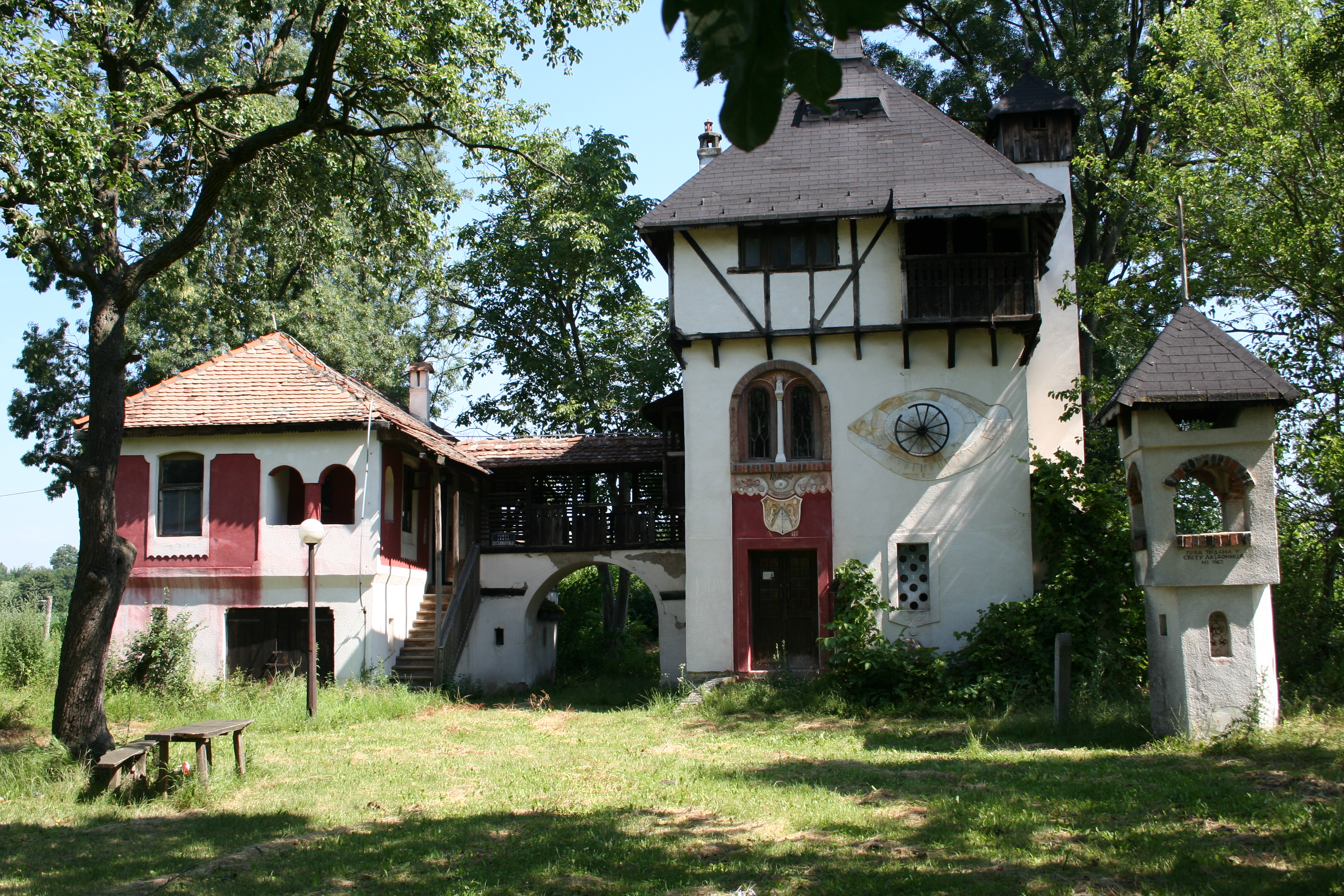
- Radovan-Tower

- Location within Serbia
- Coordinates: 44°49′02″N 19°32′31″E
- Country: Serbia
- Statistical Region: Šumadija and Western Serbia
- Region: Mačva
- District: Mačva District
- Municipality: Bogatić
- Time zone: UTC+1 (CET)
  - Summer (DST): UTC+2 (CEST)
- Postal code: 15361
- Area code: 015

Belotić (Serbian Cyrillic: Белотић) or Mačvanski Belotić (Serbian Cyrillic: Мачвански Белотић) is a village in Serbia. It is situated in the Bogatić municipality, in the Mačva District. The village has a Serb ethnic majority and the population numbered 1,557 people in a 2011 census.

== See also ==
- List of places in Serbia
- Mačva
