= Mutasallim =

Ottoman gubernatorial title

Mütesellim or müsellim (Ottoman Turkish: متسلم or مسلم; Arabic: متسلم, romanized: mutasallim; Greek: μουτεσελίμης, romanized: mouteselímis; Serbo-Croatian: muselim) was an Ottoman title used for the deputies employed by the sanjak-bey as civil governors in the nahiye administrative unit, who managed tax and tithe collection. The judicial counterpart in the nahiya was the kadi (judges).

In order to reduce conflicts between mütesellims in Anatolia, in some cases one mütesellim was appointed by the sanjak-bey as lieutenant governor in charge for the whole sanjak. The Ottoman Empire abolished the position of mütesellim in 1842. This position was often connected with conflicts between various parties who saw it as possibility to increase their personal wealth. In the period between 1842 and 1864 local military governors assisted by local administration were in charge for tax collection and control of the population instead of mütesellims. After 1864 and the creation of the vilayet system, the office of mütesellim was replaced with new position of mutasarrıf.

== See also ==
- Ayan
