= Šarena Mosque Travnik =

Mosque in Travnik, Bosnia and Herzegovina

Šarena Mosque (Sulejmanija)
- Šarena džamija
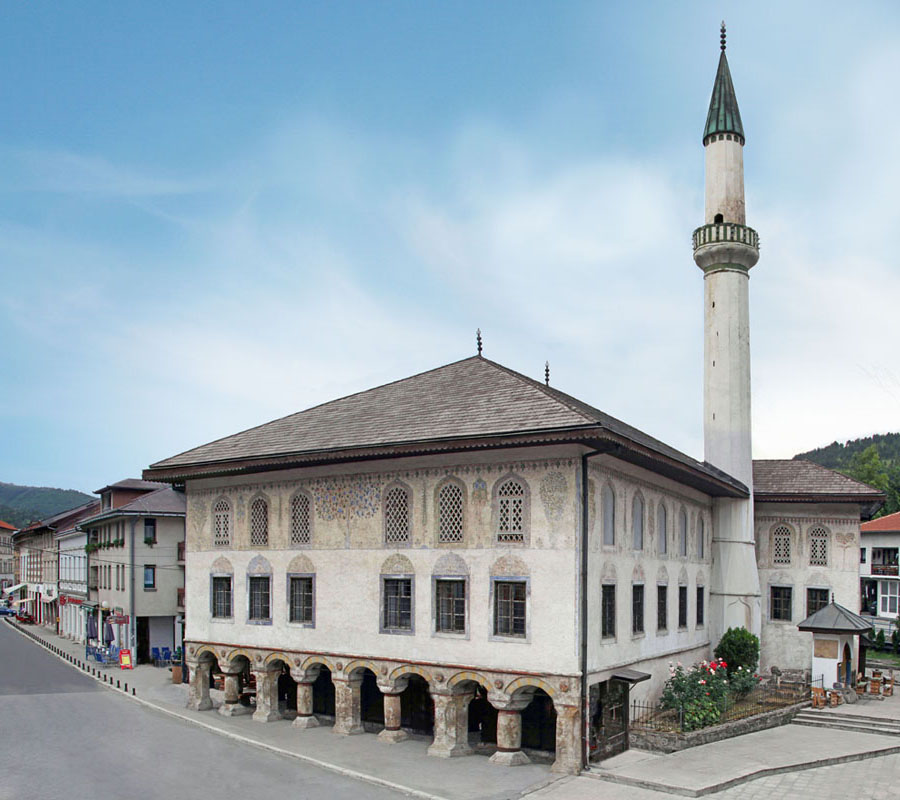

Religion
- Affiliation: Islam
- Region: Travnik

Location
- Location: Travnik, Bosnia and Herzegovina
- Country: Bosnia and Herzegovina
- Interactive map of Šarena Mosque (Sulejmanija)
- Coordinates: 44.226561°N 17.669805°E

Architecture
- Style: Ottoman architecture
- Founder: Sulejman-paša Skopljak, Gazi-aga
- Funded by: Sulejman-paša Skopljak, Ćamil Ahmed-aga, Gazi-aga
- Completed: Second half of the 16th century

Specifications
- Length: 21.88 m
- Width: 16 m
- Minaret: 1

The Šarena Mosque (Bosnian: Šarena džamija; lit. 'Painted Mosque'), also known as the Sulejmanija, is a mosque located in the Donja Čaršija neighborhood of Travnik, Bosnia and Herzegovina. It serves as the central mosque of the Travnik Muftiship. It is presumed to have been built in the second half of the 16th century. The waqf (endowment) charter of the mosque's first restorer notes that it was originally built by Gazi-aga.

== History ==
In 1757, the vizier Ćamil Ahmed-aga built a mosque on the site, which the local residents named the Ćamilija. It burned down in a fire in 1815, and the Bosnian vizier Sulejman-paša Skopljak built a new mosque in its place. Following this reconstruction in 1816, the mosque acquired its present appearance.

The Sulejmanija survived the catastrophic Travnik fire of 1903. The building suffered some damage during World War II, and it was not until the 1980s that a thorough restoration was carried out, returning the mosque to its former appearance, including its distinctive floral ornaments.

== Architecture and characteristics ==
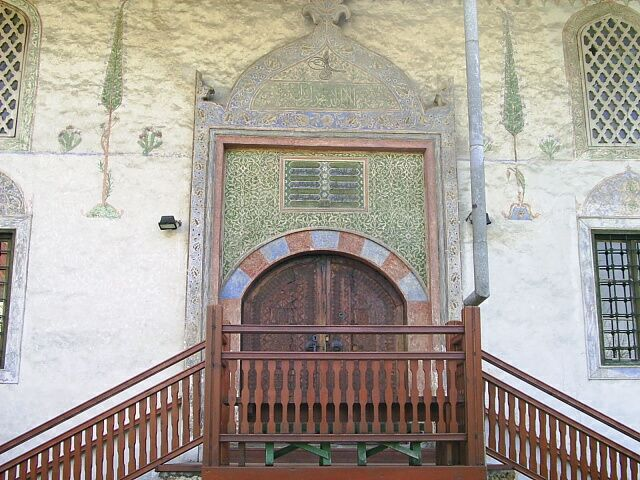
Entrance to the mosque

The Šarena Mosque features a slightly elongated rectangular layout, accompanied by a minaret and an added portico in the rear left corner. It consists of three levels. On the ground floor, beneath the entire mosque, is a stone bezistan (covered market) that previously housed ten shops. These shops have since been removed. The bezistan is divided by two rows of massive wooden pillars (six on each side) into two aisles that were once partitioned into shops and a central cobblestone passage, which acted as an internal street. Today, the bezistan serves as a single unified retail space. The exterior dimensions of the mosque on the ground floor are 21.88 by 16 meters, while the interior dimensions of the bezistan are 12.30 by 8.20 meters. The Sulejmanija represents a unique example in Ottoman architecture where the same building is used simultaneously for both sacred and secular purposes.

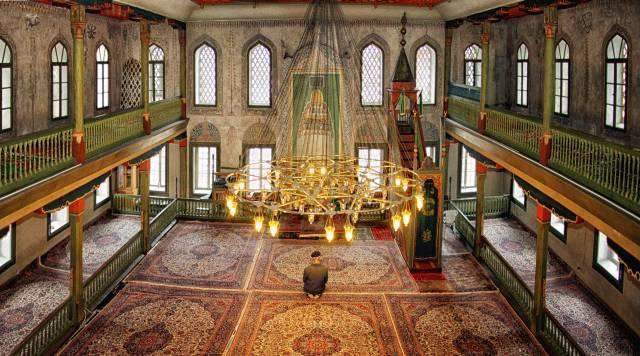
Interior of the mosque

The minaret is located on the left side of the mosque instead of the right, which departs from the general rule for Islamic places of worship. This placement is attributed to the damp and unstable ground on the western (right) side of the building. It is presumed that the minaret is older than the current mosque and dates back to the previous Ćamilija mosque.

=== Decorations ===
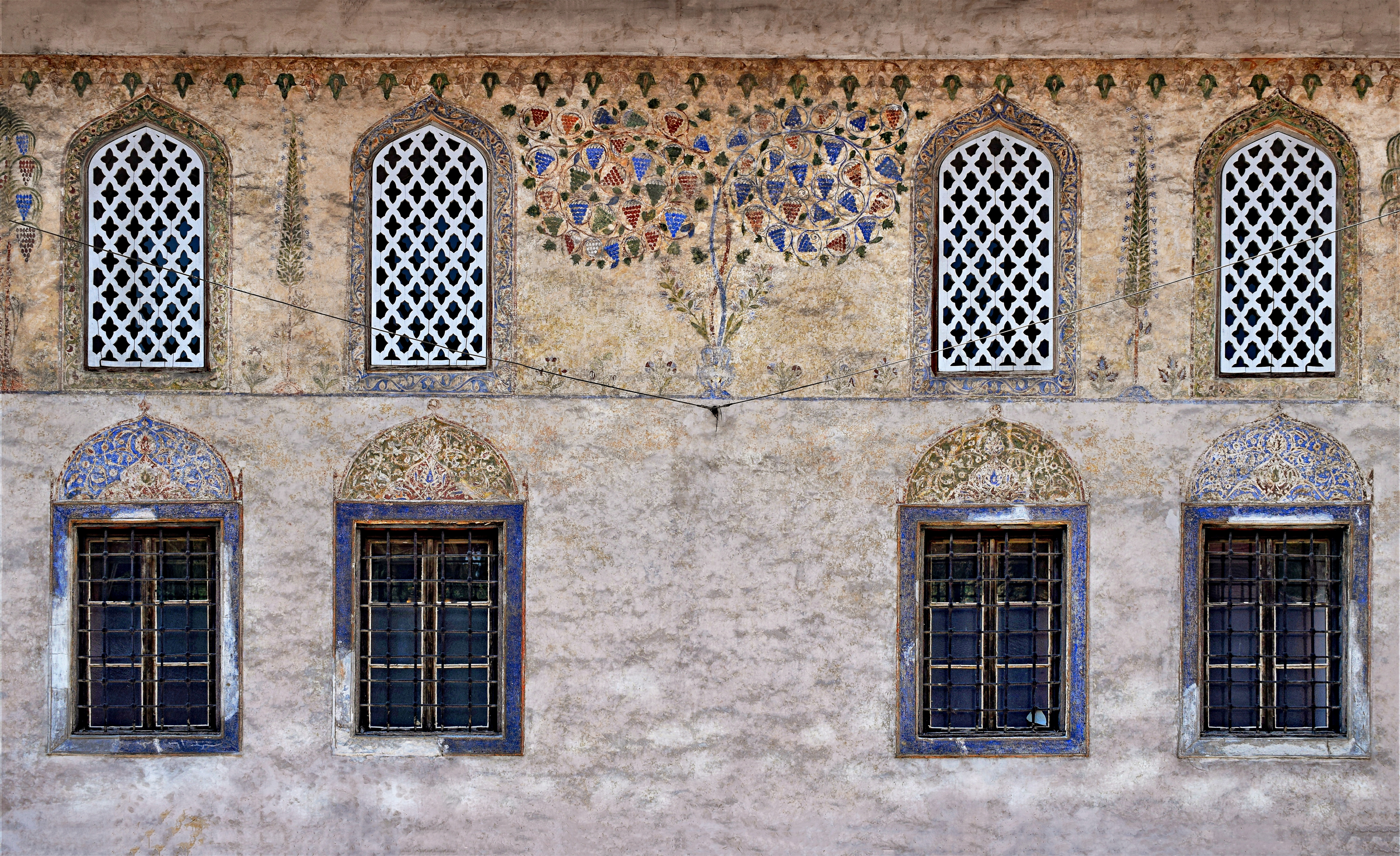
Arabesques on the mosque's walls

The building was named the Šarena Mosque (Painted Mosque) due to the unusual artistic decorations on its interior and exterior walls, which were added during the 1816 reconstruction. The beautifully painted ornamental sections above the mihrab and the arched spaces above the windows are particularly prominent. The gallery above the windows features the names of the closest companions (Sahabah) of the Prophet Muhammad, written in calligraphic Arabic script. The coffered ceiling and the wooden pillars supporting the gallery and roof structure are vibrantly decorated.

The decoration was executed on fine mortar mixed with copious amounts of lime and organic material (chaff and sawdust). The master craftsman incised the basic sketch into the mortar with a sharp object, likely while the mortar was not completely dry. The decoration was then carried out using an inconsistent fresco technique; since the mortar was already somewhat dry, egg tempera was used as a binder. Consequently, the pigment did not bond securely to the base. Over time, exposed to the elements, the ornamentation suffered such damage and alteration that by the Austro-Hungarian period, it had been covered with a coat of whitewash. However, according to some scholars, the decoration was not damaged during the Austro-Hungarian era. Evidence for this is a photograph from 1906, taken when Travnik received electricity, which shows a wooden power pole with the well-preserved decorated mosque in the background.

Nevertheless, during the Austro-Hungarian period, the decoration on the facades and in the interior was whitewashed, and then repainted with stenciled ornamentation. Milk was used as a binder for this new decoration, but due to its weak consistency, it also faded over time. Eventually, the overall appearance was so altered that the colors and shapes were barely recognizable.

In the 1950s, the Institute for the Protection of Cultural Monuments of Bosnia and Herzegovina granted a request from the Waqf Directorate and allowed the facade to be whitewashed, provided that the oldest ornamentation was not destroyed by chipping it away. It was believed that this would protect the decoration, as the layer of whitewash was intended to conserve it and insulate it from the weather. The original decorations on the facades and the interior of the mosque were uncovered again in 1992.
