= Mihailo Obrenović, Prince of Serbia =

Prince of Serbia (1839–1842, 1860–1868)

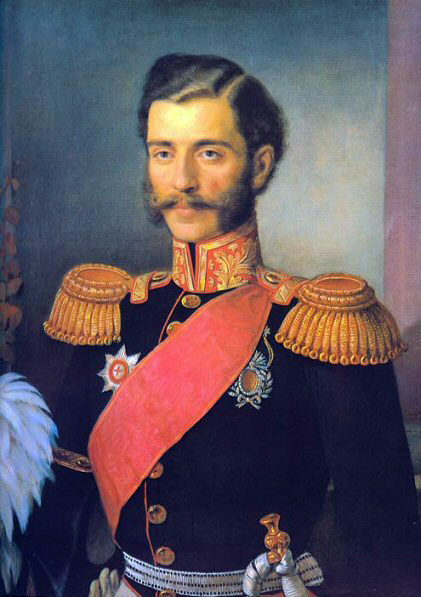
- Portrait, c. 1860

Prince of Serbia
- Reign: 8 July 1839 – 14 September 1842
- Predecessor: Milan Obrenović II
- Successor: Alexander Karađorđević
- Reign: 26 September 1860 – 10 June 1868
- Predecessor: Miloš Obrenović I
- Successor: Milan Obrenović IV
- Born: 16 September 1823; Kragujevac, Principality of Serbia
- Died: 10 June 1868 (aged 44); Belgrade, Principality of Serbia
- Spouse: Júlia Hunyady de Kéthely (m. 1853)
- Issue: Velimir Mihailo Teodorović (illegitimate); Milan Obrenović IV (adopted)
- House: Obrenović
- Father: Miloš Obrenović I
- Mother: Ljubica Vukomanović
- Religion: Serbian Orthodox
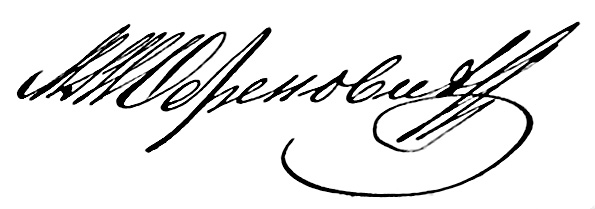
- Signature

Mihailo Obrenović III (Serbian Cyrillic: Михаило Обреновић, romanized: Mihailo Obrenović; 16 September 1823 – 10 June 1868) was the ruling Prince of Serbia from 1839 to 1842 and again from 1860 to 1868.

His first reign ended when he was deposed in 1842, and his second ended when he was assassinated in 1868. He is considered to be a great reformer and the most enlightened ruler of modern Serbia, as one of the European enlightened absolute monarchs. He succeeded in negotiating a withdrawal of Ottoman troops from Serbian soil, while retaining certain Serbian ties to Constantinople. He advocated the idea of a Balkan federation against the Ottoman Empire.

== Early life ==
Mihailo was the son of Miloš Obrenović, Prince of Serbia and his wife, Ljubica, Princess of Serbia. He was born in Kragujevac, the second surviving son of the couple. In 1823, he became the first person in Serbia to be vaccinated against smallpox, which took away the lives of three of his siblings: Petar, Marija and Velika. He spent his childhood in Kragujevac, then in Požarevac and Belgrade. Having finished his education in Požarevac, Mihailo left Serbia with his mother to go to Vienna. His elder brother by four years, Milan Obrenović II, born in 1819, was frequently in poor health.

== First reign ==
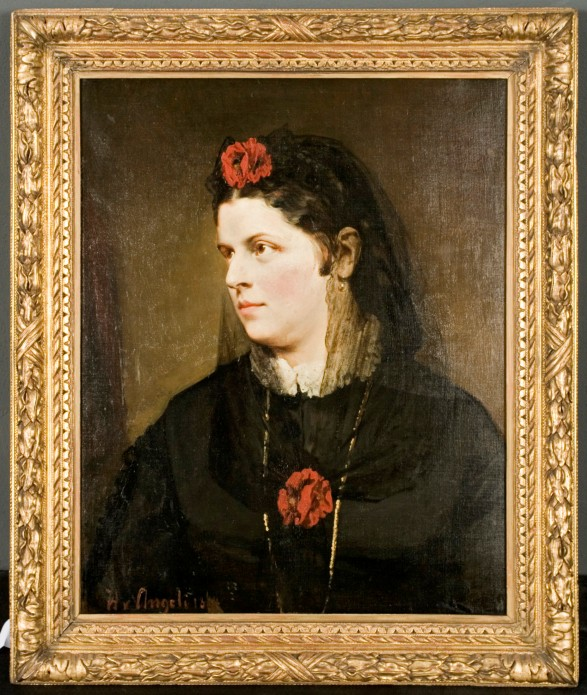
Princess Maria Josefa of Liechtenstein, Mihailo's first love

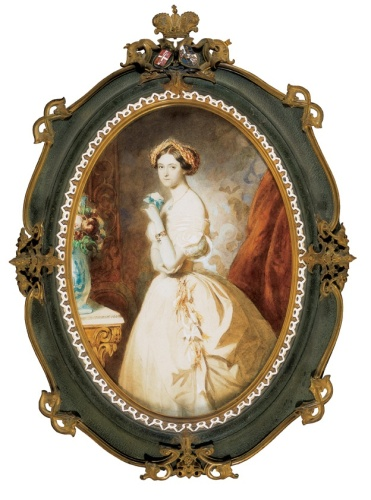
Portrait of Princess Julia Obrenović by Bernard (1855)

Initially, Prince Miloš abdicated in favour of his firstborn son, Prince Milan Obrenović II, who was by then terminally ill and died after just one month of rule. After the death of his elder brother, Mihailo came to the throne as a minor, having been born in late 1823, and proclaimed prince on 25 June 1839. He was declared of full age the following year. Few thrones appeared more secure, and his rule might have endured throughout his life but for his want of energy and inattention to political developments. During his first reign, on 19 November 1841 he has founded Society of Serbian Letters, but his inexperience meant he did not cope well with some other important challenges Serbia faced. On 14 September 1842, his reign was ended by a rebellion led by Toma Vučić-Perišić, which enabled the Karađorđević dynasty to assume power and stay on the throne for another sixteen years.

== Life in exile, forbidden love, marriage ==
After the overthrow, Prince Mihailo withdrew from Serbia across the rivers of Sava and Danube with around one thousand of his adherents. His destiny was decided by Austria and Turkey. Prince Mihailo was directed to the estate of his sister, Princess Jelisaveta Obrenović, Baroness Nikolić de Rudna, while his mother, Princess Ljubica was sent to Novi Sad. She died there alone in 1843. Mihailo organized her burial at Krušedol monastery.

He wrote to Vučić in 1853 to say that he did not want to recover the throne by violence. The prince later moved to Vienna, where he lived with his father in Palais Salm, bought by them in 1852. There he managed his father's large estate. At that time, he wrote the poem "Što se bore misli moje" ("Why do my thoughts torture me"). It was dedicated to his first love, Princess Maria Josefa von und zu Liechtenstein, the youngest daughter of Prince Karl Joseph of Liechtenstein and his wife, Countess Franziska von Würben und Freudenthal. He asked for her hand, but her father initially declined, as Mihailo was an Orthodox and she was a staunch Catholic. Furthermore, Karl Joseph thought that Maria Josefa was a too good catch for a deposed Prince, member of the House of Obrenovic, an upstart vassal dynasty whose wealth came from trading. At the time, Obrenović family were living in exile, while Serbia has been ruled by the rival Karadjordjevic dynasty. After being rejected and insulted, Mihailo, broke all social contacts with this line of the Liechtenstein family, who were also living in Vienna. Princess Maria Josepha later married Prince Ferdinand Bonaventura Kinsky von Wchinitz und Tettau and is ancestor of many royals, including the ruling Prince Hans Adam II of Liechtenstein.

On 1 August 1853, Mihailo married Countess Júlia Hunyady de Kéthely in the Russian chapel in Vienna. She was the youngest child and only daughter of Count Ferenc Hunyady de Kéthely and his wife, Countess Julia Zichy de Zich et Vásonkeő. The marriage proved to be unhappy and childless, although Mihailo had one illegitimate child, a son Velimir Mihailo Teodorović by his former Styrian mistress Maria Berghaus. While living in exile, he spoke French and German fluently.

== Second reign and assassination ==
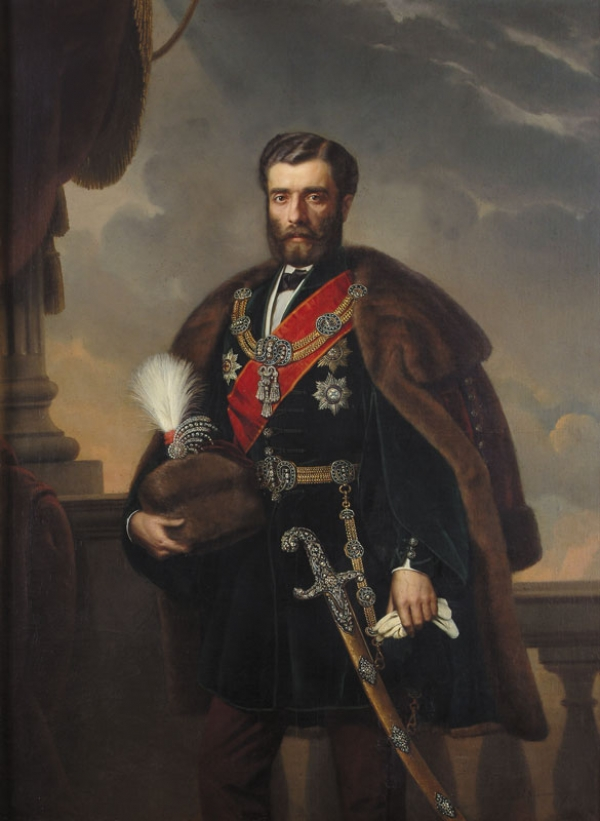
Portrait of Mihailo by Johann Böss, c. 1859–60

Mihailo was accepted back as Prince of Serbia after 18 years in exile, in September 1860, after the death of his father who had regained the throne in 1858. For the next eight years, he ruled as an enlightened monarch. Mihailo sought to reduce the authority and immunity of Serbian senators. During his second reign, the People's Assembly was convened just three times.

Prince Mihailo's greatest achievement was achieving a complete withdrawal of Turkish troops from Serbia in 1862. The Turkish presence had previously been restricted to a few fortresses and a designated neighborhood in Belgrade. Serbians were eventually allowed into the Turkish neighborhood with altercations sometimes reaching the point of major disturbances. After one such riot in the wake of the Čukur Fountain incident in June, 1862, which threatened the Turkish Belgrade Fortress, the Turks responded by bombarding the city. A Turkish inquiry ensued and the Great Powers which had allowed a Turkish presence in Serbia during the settlements of the Crimean War, summoned a conference at Constantinople in order to broker a conference between Serbs and Turks.

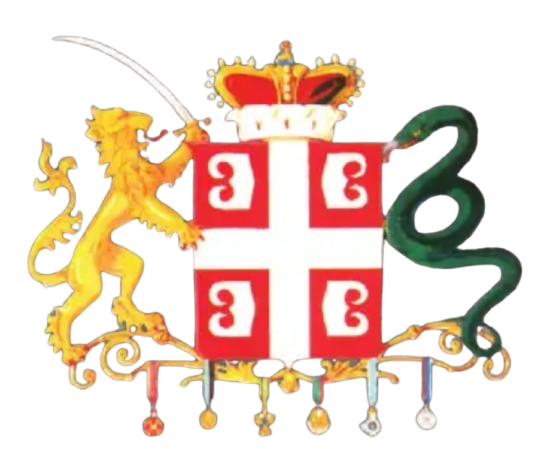
Coat of arms of Mihailo Obrenović

On September 4, 1862, the conference reached an agreement in which it was decreed that all Muslim inhabitants should be withdrawn from Serbia with the exceptions of existing garrisons in Belgrade, Fetislam, Šabac, and Smederevo. Prince Michael meanwhile continued to negotiate for all Turkish troops to be withdrawn from the country. Prince Michael wrote a letter to Grand Vizier Mehmed Fuad Pasha, emphasizing the lack of national interest the Ottomans had in maintaining troops in Serbia, and expounding upon the importance that the Serbs placed in the departure of all foreign troops.

The Sultan did not permit complete Serbian independence, but Serbian troops in service of the Ottoman government were permitted to replace Turkish troops at the garrisons, and the Serbian flag was allowed to fly over the fortresses alongside that of the Turkish flag.

This was not viewed as a sufficient concession by Serbian nationalists and partisans of the Karađorđević dynasty, still viewing the prince with enmity at having displaced their preferred royal family.

In 1866–68, Mihailo forged The First Balkan Alliance by signing the series of agreements with other Balkan entities.

During his rule, the first modern Serbian coins were minted. He was also the first in modern Serbian history to declare Belgrade the official capital city of the country.

Mihailo wished to divorce his wife, Julia, in order to marry his young mistress, Katarina Konstantinović, the daughter of his first cousin, Princess Anka Obrenović. Both resided at the royal court at his invitation. His plans for a divorce and subsequent remarriage to Katarina met with much protest from politicians, clergy and the general public. His astute and gifted Prime Minister Ilija Garašanin was dismissed from his post in 1867 for daring to voice his opposition to the divorce. However, the actual divorce never took place.

In the meantime, before the affair with his cousin Katarina, Mihailo had been seeking to arrange a marriage that would be both politically advantageous and ensure the continuation of his line. As early as 1864, he dispatched envoys to explore the possibility of marrying Princess Jelena Karađorđević, the youngest daughter of the deposed Alexander Karađorđević, former Prince of Serbia. However, her mother, Princess Persida, categorically rejected the proposal. Mihailo renewed his efforts in 1866, but the outcome was the same.

Also, in the early months of 1867, Alexander Semenovich Ionin, the Russian consul in Dubrovnik, reported to the Ministry of Foreign Affairs of the Russian Empire, that Mihailo Obrenović, who was "persistently intent on replacing his wife Princess Julia", had, through the mediation of his aide-de-camp, Colonel Ljubomir Ivanović, pledged himself in marriage to the widowed Princess Darinka of Montenegro. The envisioned union, however, was not merely personal; its deeper intention and purpose was the political consolidation of Serbia and Montenegro under a single sovereign authority.

While Prince Mihailo Obrenović was gradually introducing absolutism, a conspiracy was formed against him. The main organizers and perpetrators were the brothers Radovanović, who wanted to avenge their brother, Ljubomir Radovanović, who was in prison. Kosta Radovanović, the main perpetrator, was a wealthy and respected merchant. His brother, Pavle Radovanović, was with him during the assassination, and the third of the brothers, Đorđe Radovanović, was also involved. Prince Mihailo Obrenović was also member of the masonic lodge.

On 10 June 1868 Mihailo was travelling with Katarina and Princess Anka in a carriage through the park of Košutnjak near his country residence on the outskirts of Belgrade. In the park appeared Pavle and Kosta Radovanović in formal black suits, and pointing a loaded gun at the Prince, Kosta approached the carriage. Prince Mihailo Obrenović recognized him, because of a dispute over his brother Ljubomir. The last words of the prince, which Kosta himself admitted when on trial, were: "Well, it's true." Mihailo and Anka were shot dead, and Katarina wounded. Further details of the plot behind the assassination have never been clarified; the sympathizers and cousins of the Karađorđević dynasty were suspected of being behind the crime, but this has not been proven. The National Assembly declared the House of Karađorđević perpetually excluded from ruling and proclaimed Prince Michael's fourteen year old cousin Milan as the legitimate heir to the Serbian throne.

== Orders and decorations ==
- Order of Saint Anna (Russian Empire)
- Order of the White Eagle (Russian Empire)
- Order of Saint Alexander Nevsky (Russian Empire)
- Order of the Redeemer (Kingdom of Greece)
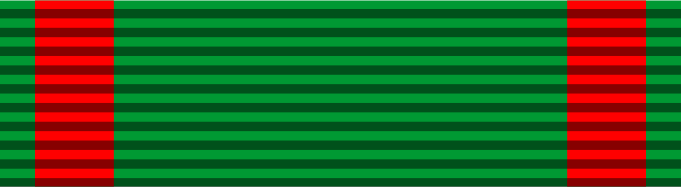
- Order of Osmanieh (Ottoman Empire)
- Order of Glory (Ottoman Empire)
- Order of the Medjidie (Ottoman Empire)
- Order of Leopold (Austrian Empire)
- Order of Saints Maurice and Lazarus (Kingdom of Italy)
- Order of Prince Danilo I (Principality of Montenegro)

== Gallery ==
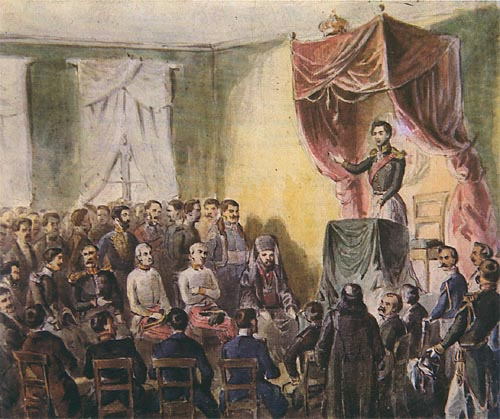
Prince Mihailo speaks to the Society of Serbian Scholarship members at the first meeting on 8 June 1842

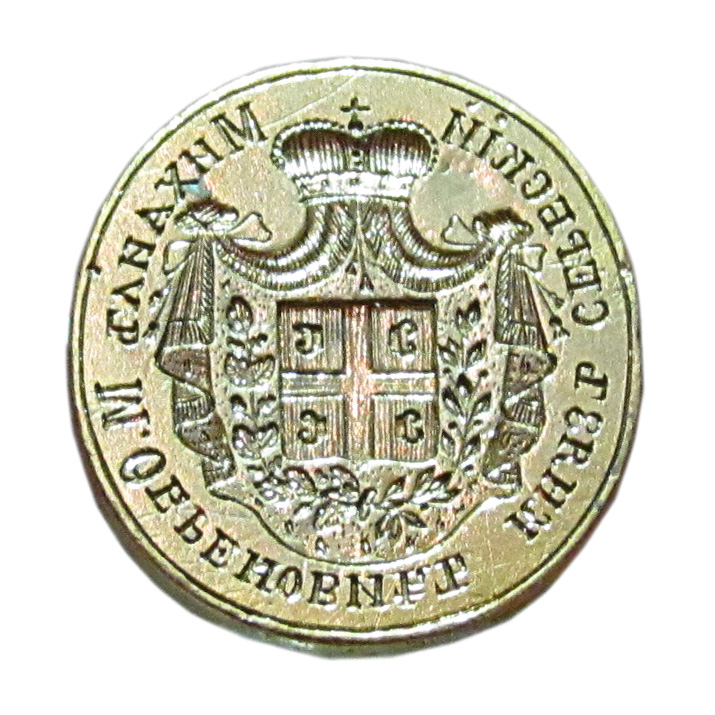
Prince Michael's official seal

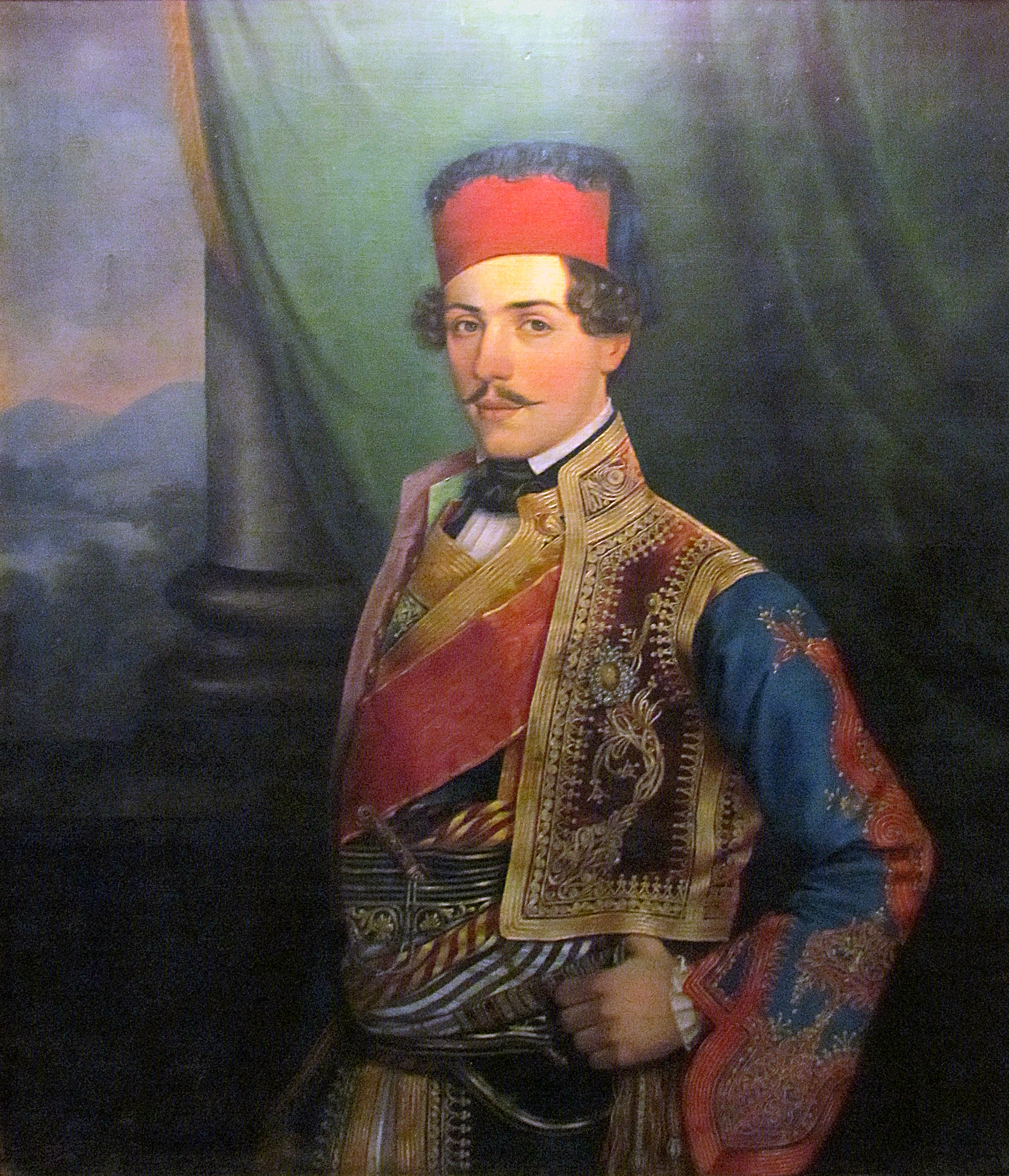
Portrait of Prince Michael by Jovan Popović, 1841

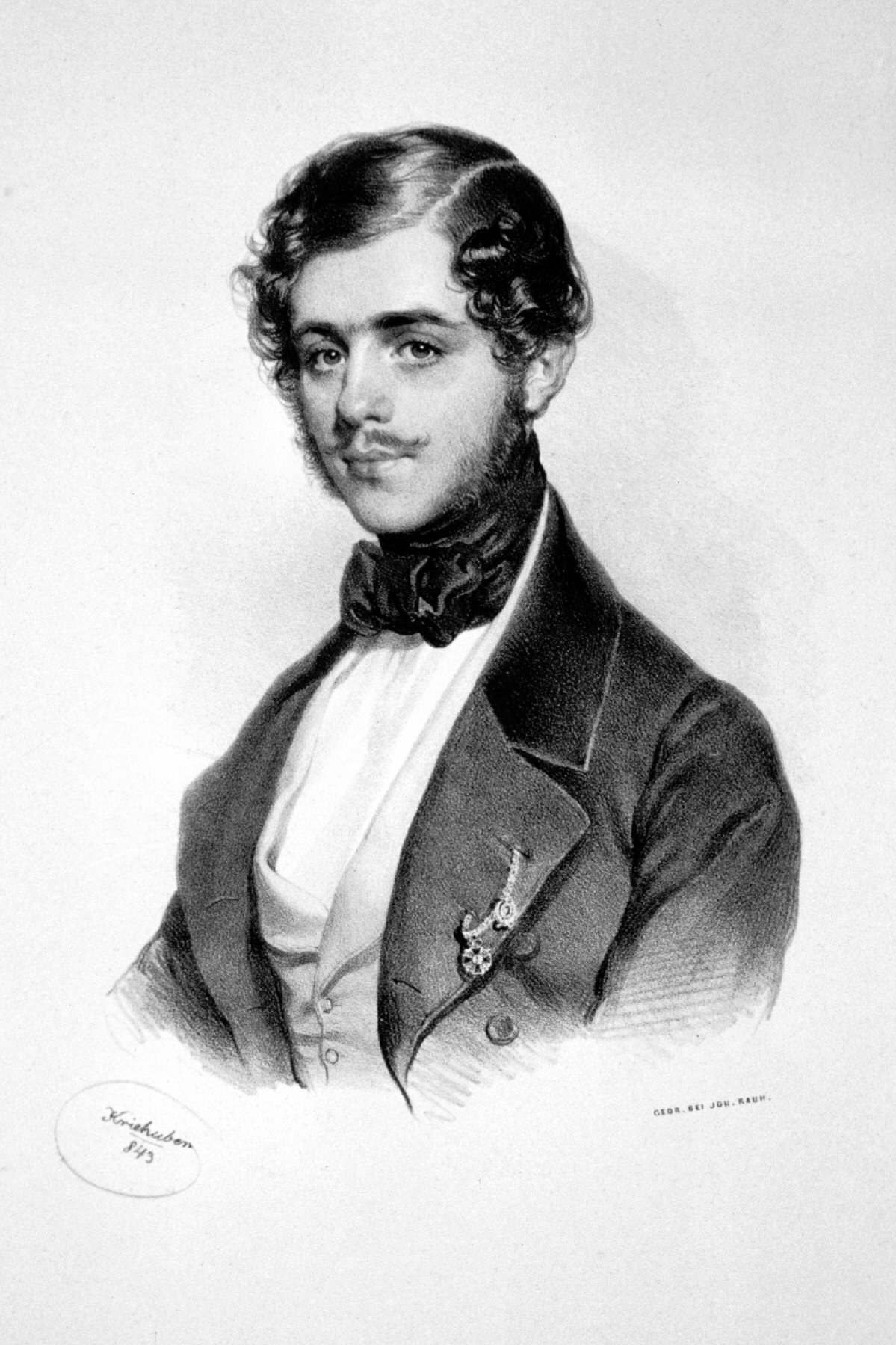
A lithography of Prince Michael by Josef Kriehuber, 1843

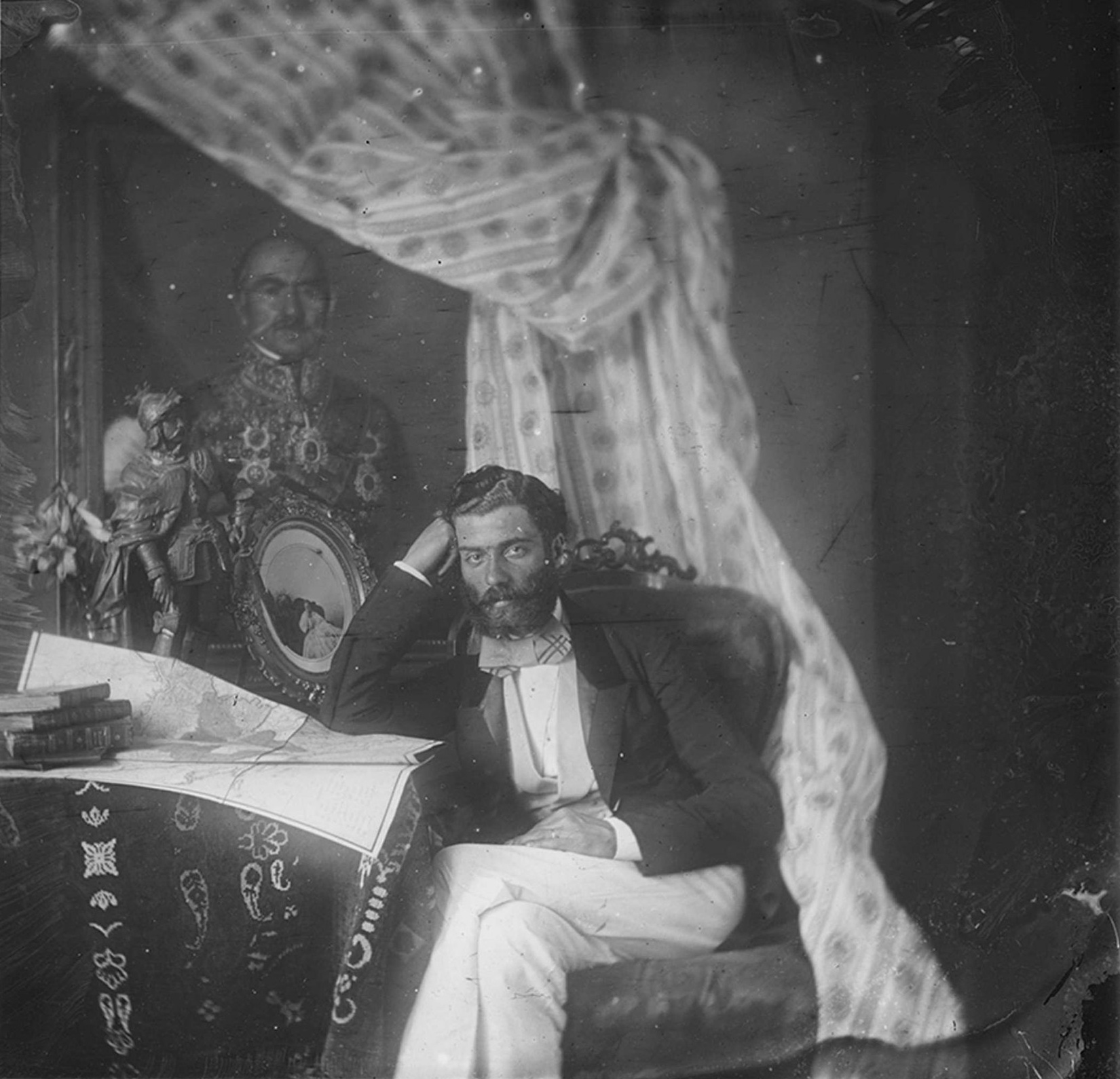
A photo of Prince Michael by Anastas Jovanović, 1856

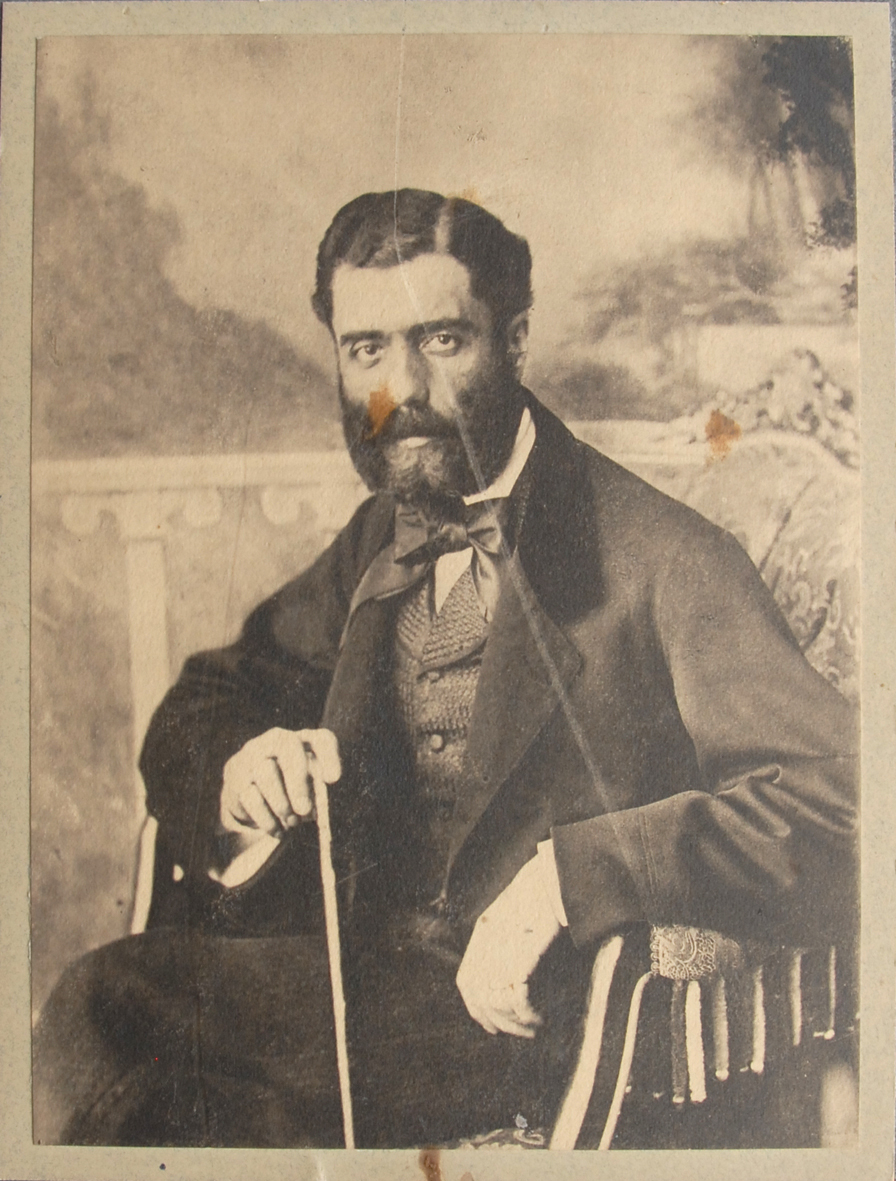
A photo of Prince Michael, ca. 1860

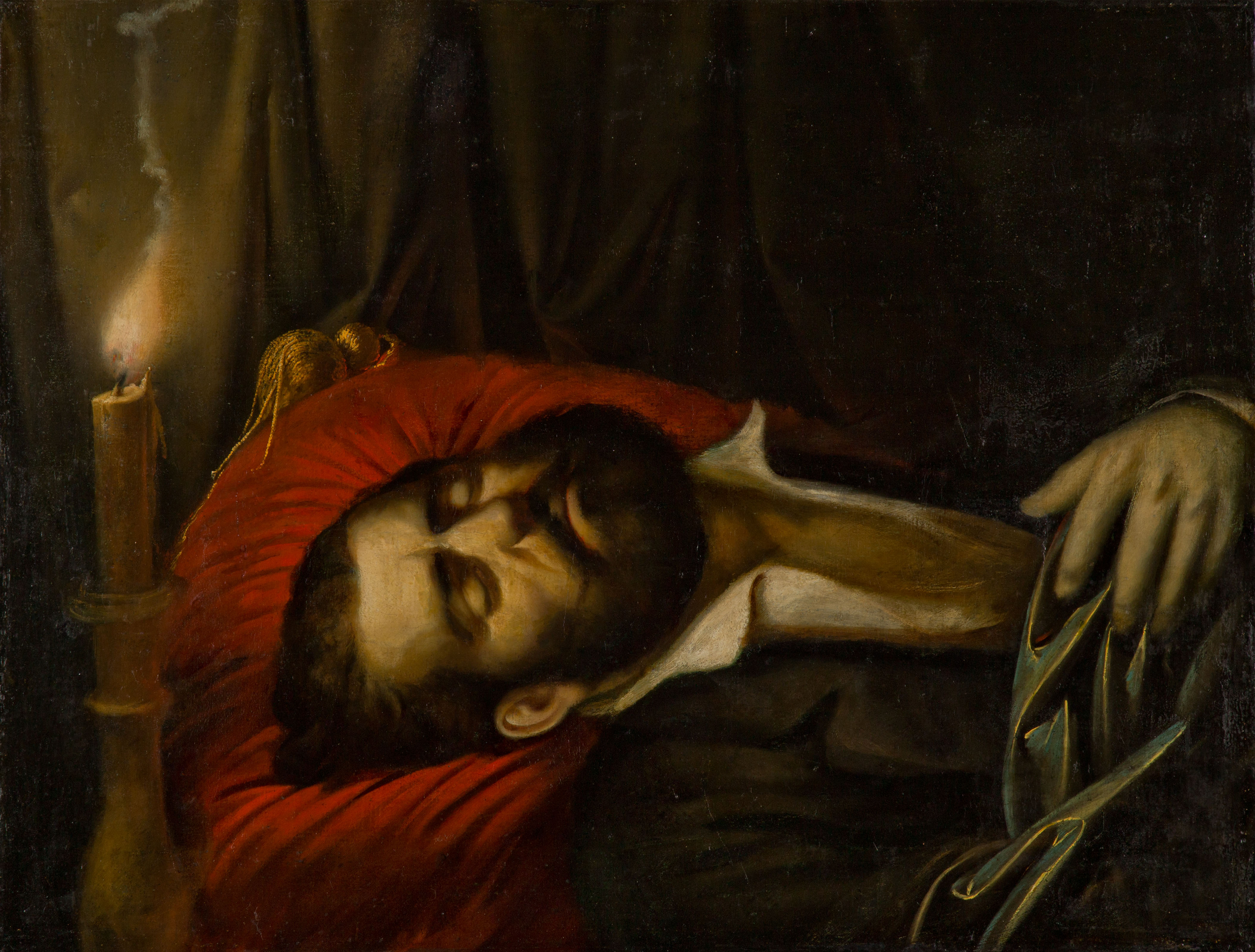
"Knez Mihailo na odru" by Đura Jakšić, 1868‒1869

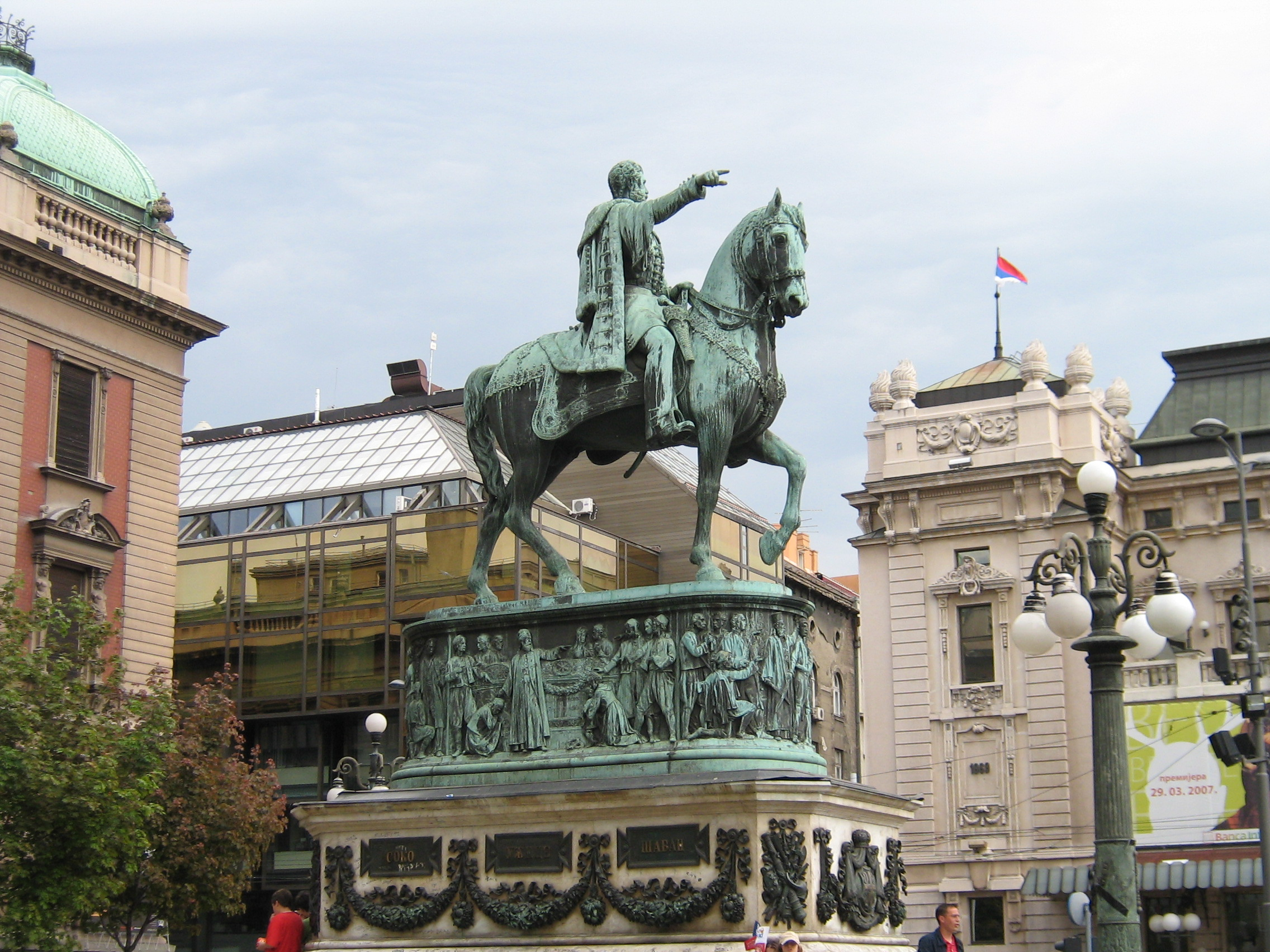
The statue of Prince Michael on Republic Square in Belgrade

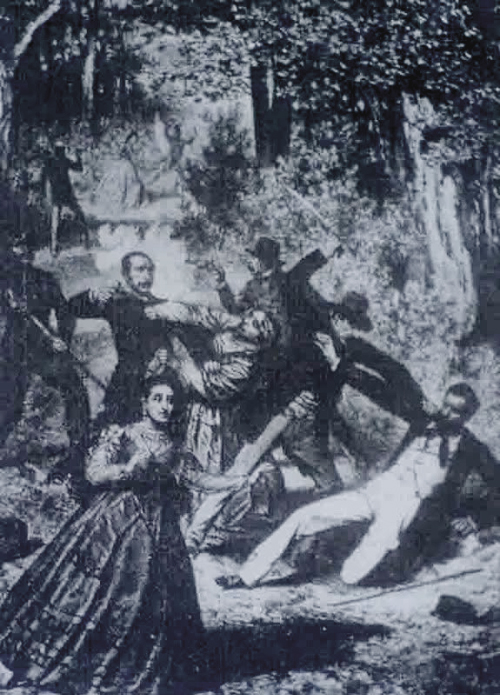
Lithography of V. Katsler illustrating the assassination of serbian prince Mihailo Obrenovic and his cousin Anka in 1868

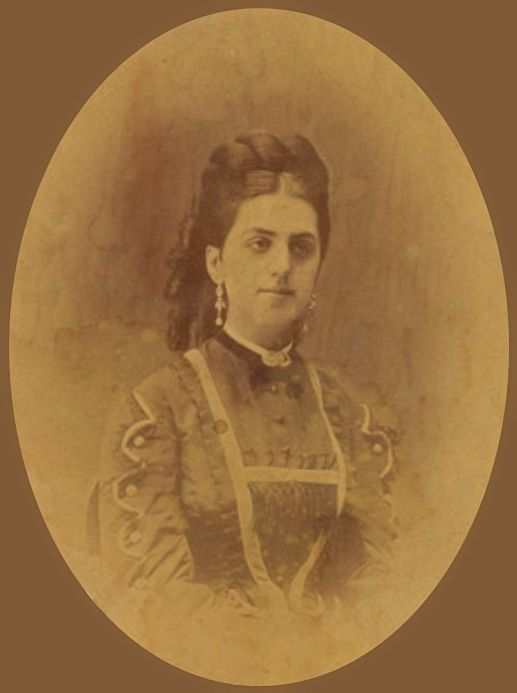
Katarina Konstantinović, Mihailo's cousin and mistress, daughter of Princess Anka Obrenović

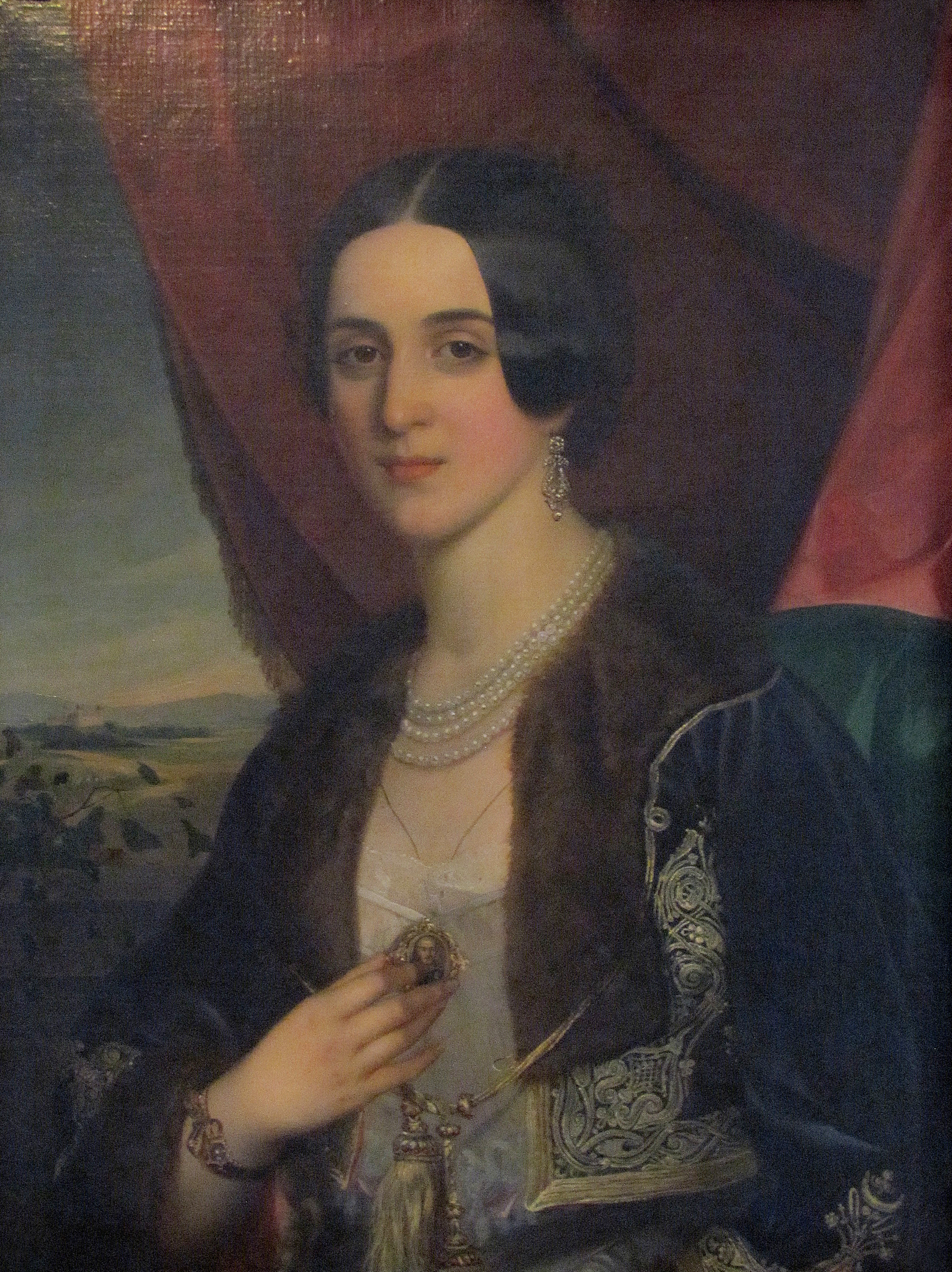
Mihailo's sister, Princess Jelisaveta Obrenović, Baroness Nikolić of Rudna (1818-1848) by Miklós Barabás

Properties

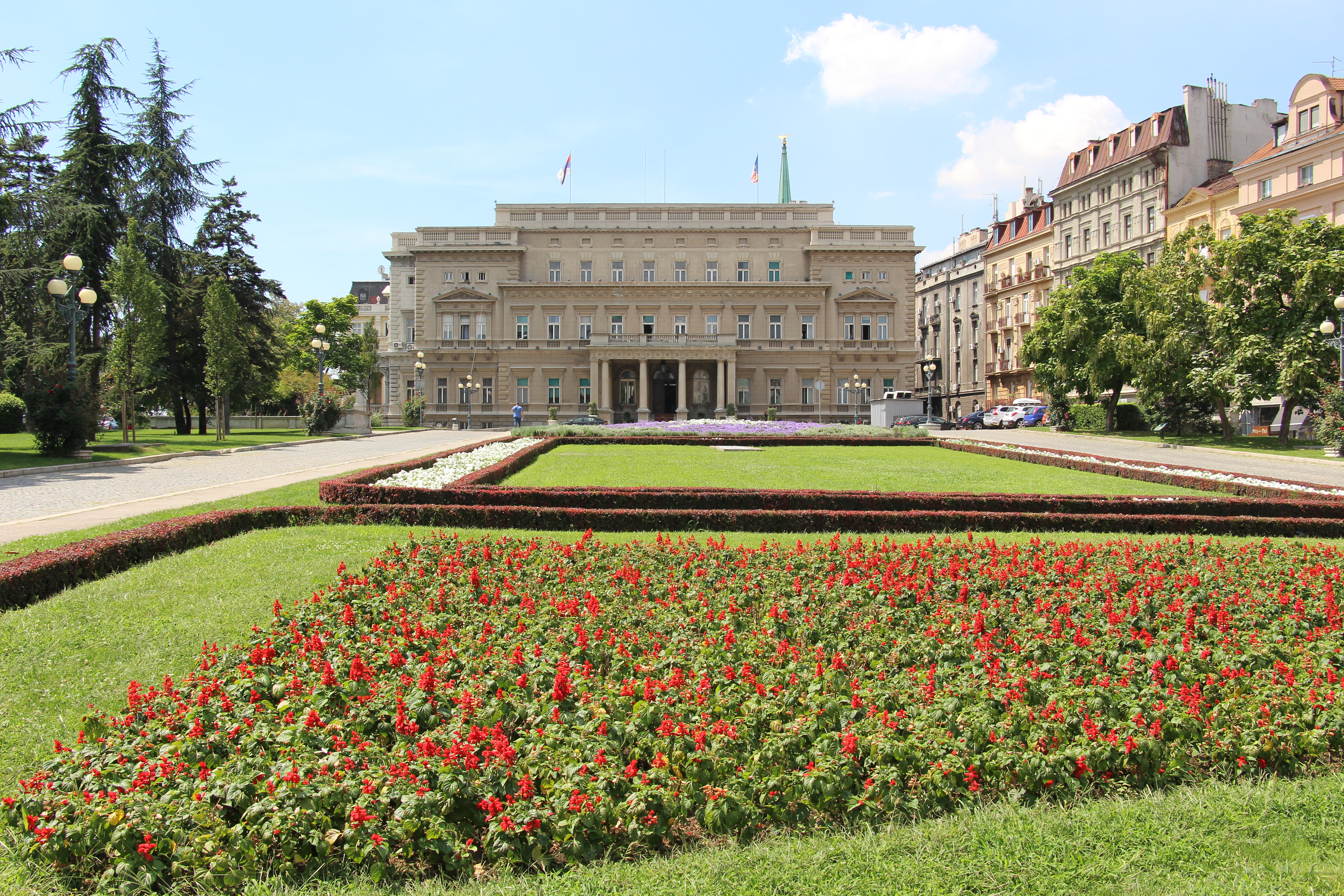
Old palace, Prince's residence in Belgrade

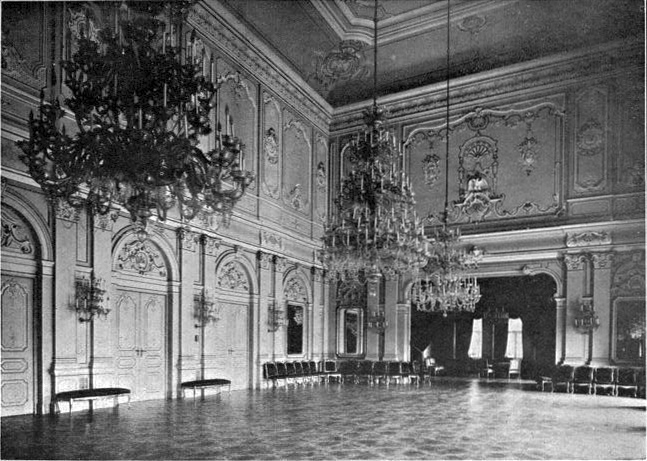
Ballroom in Old palace, Belgrade

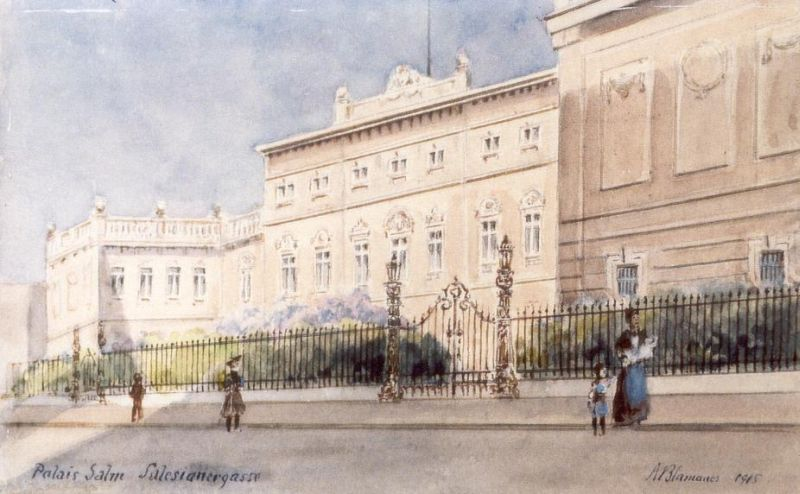
Palais Salm-Vetsera in Vienna, owned by Prince Mihailo Obrenović

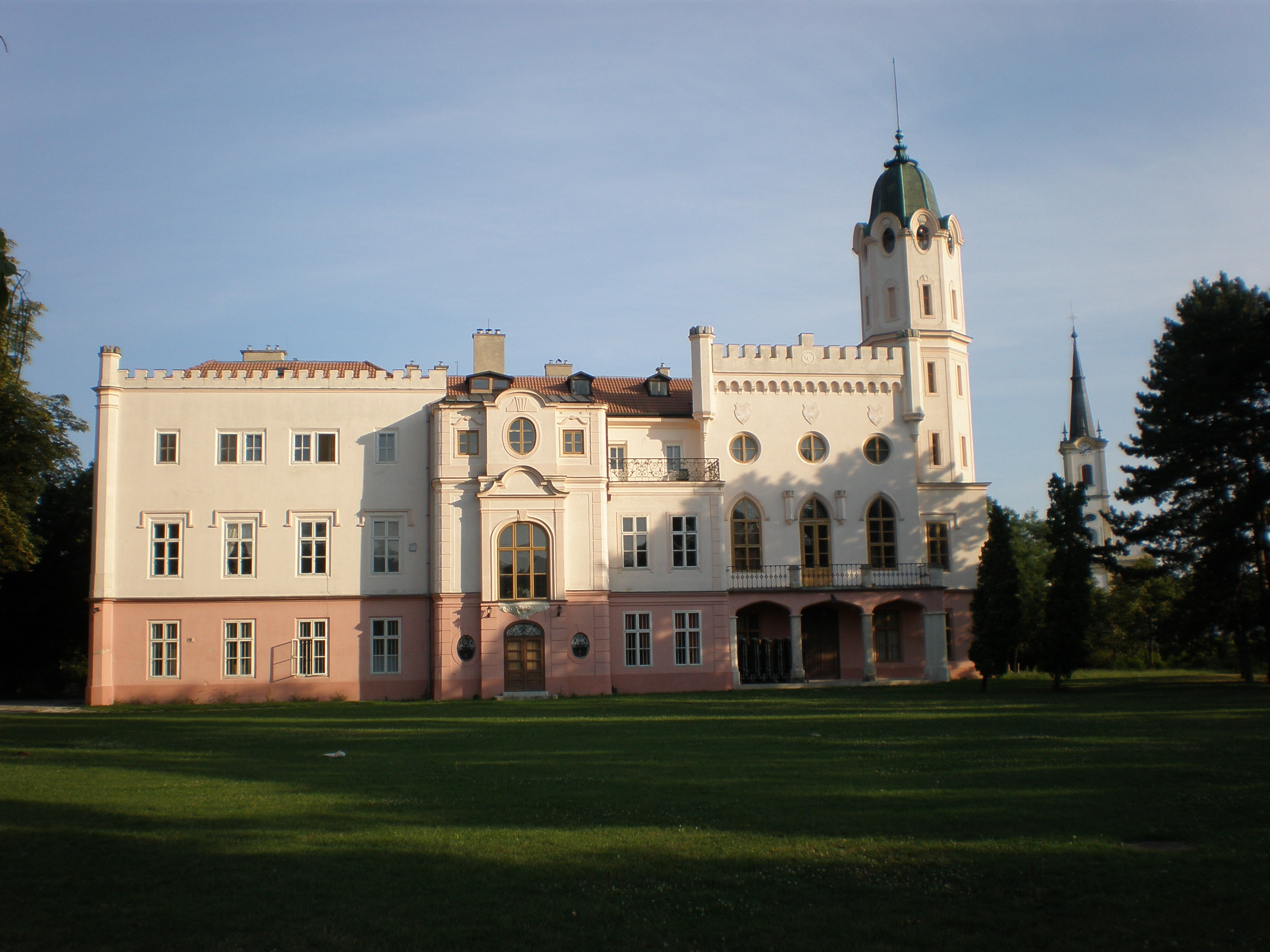
Ivanka pri Dunaji, Mihailo's residence in Slovakia

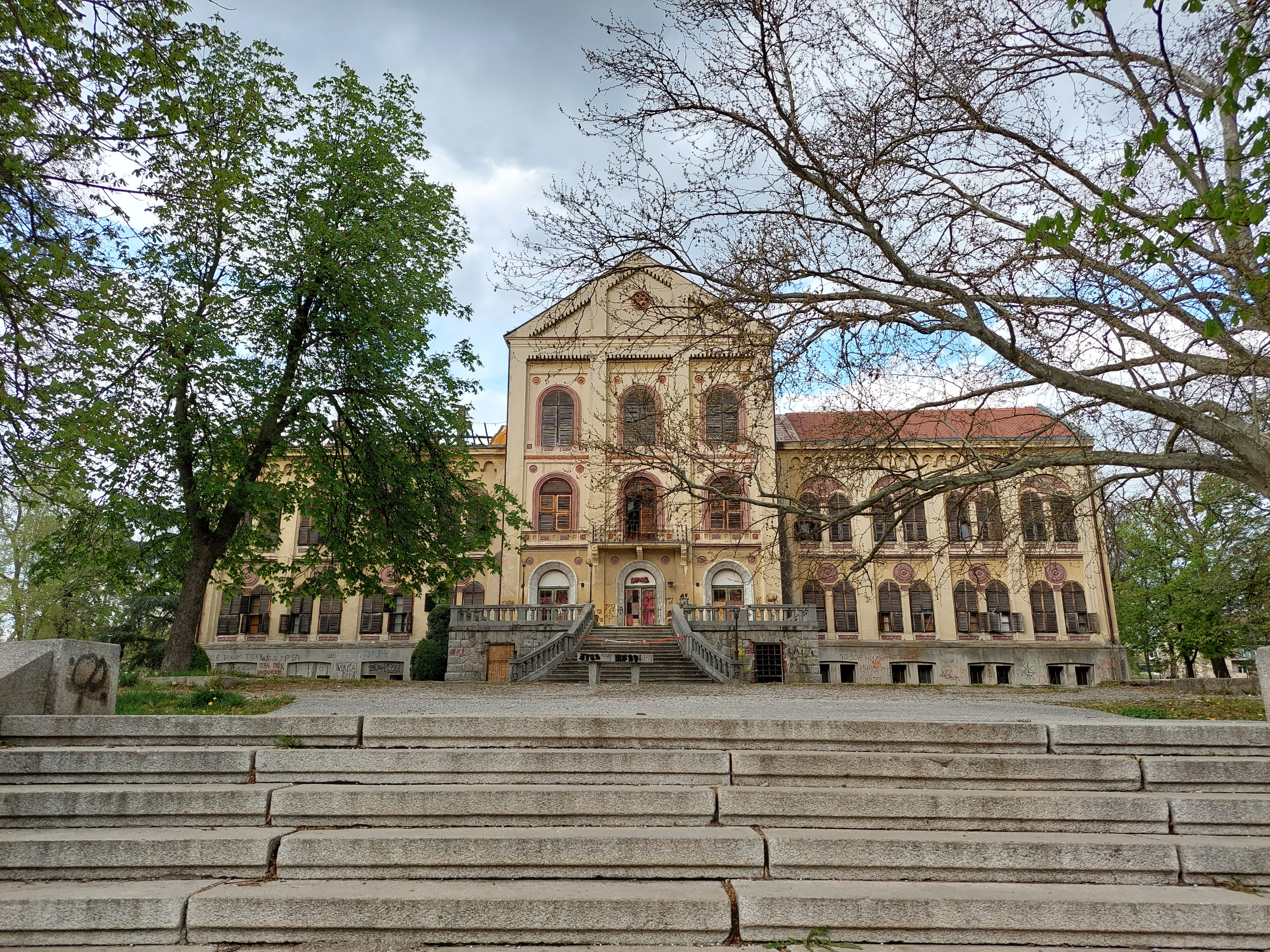
Prince Michael's summer residence in Aranđelovac.

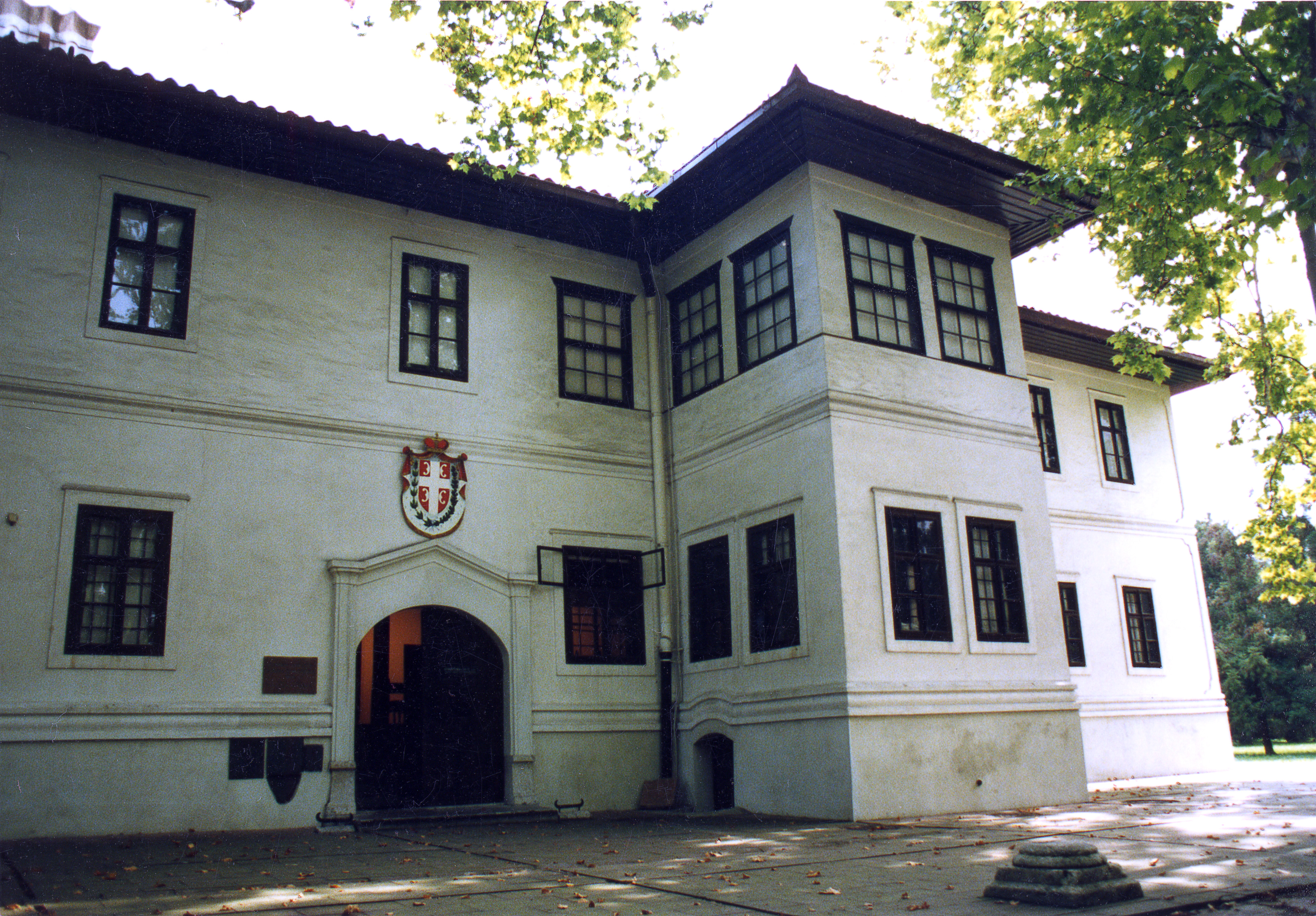
Mihailo's residence in Topčider, nearby where he was assassinated

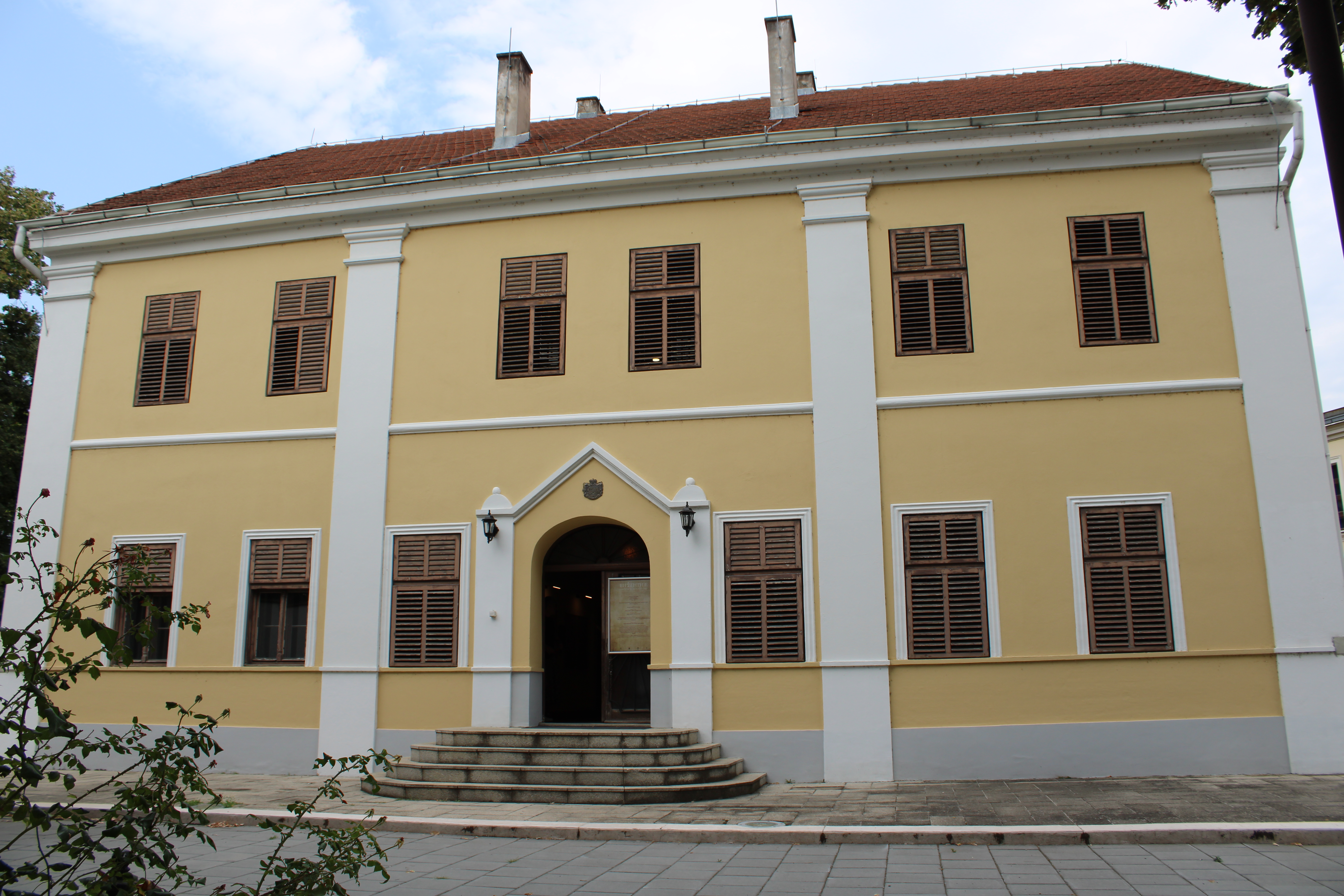
Prince Mihailo's residence in Kragujevac

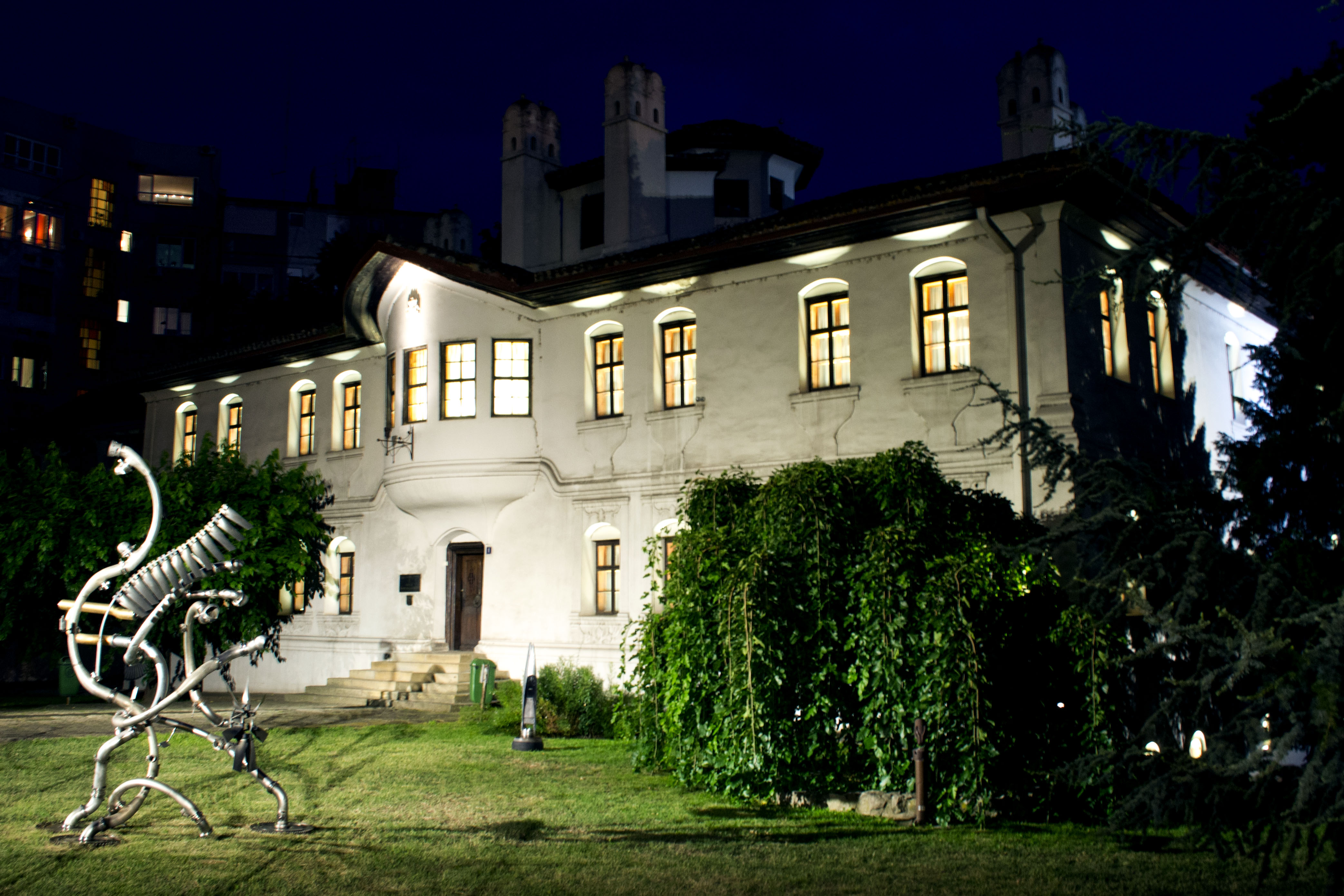
Residence of Princess Ljubica, where Prince Mihailo lived until 1842

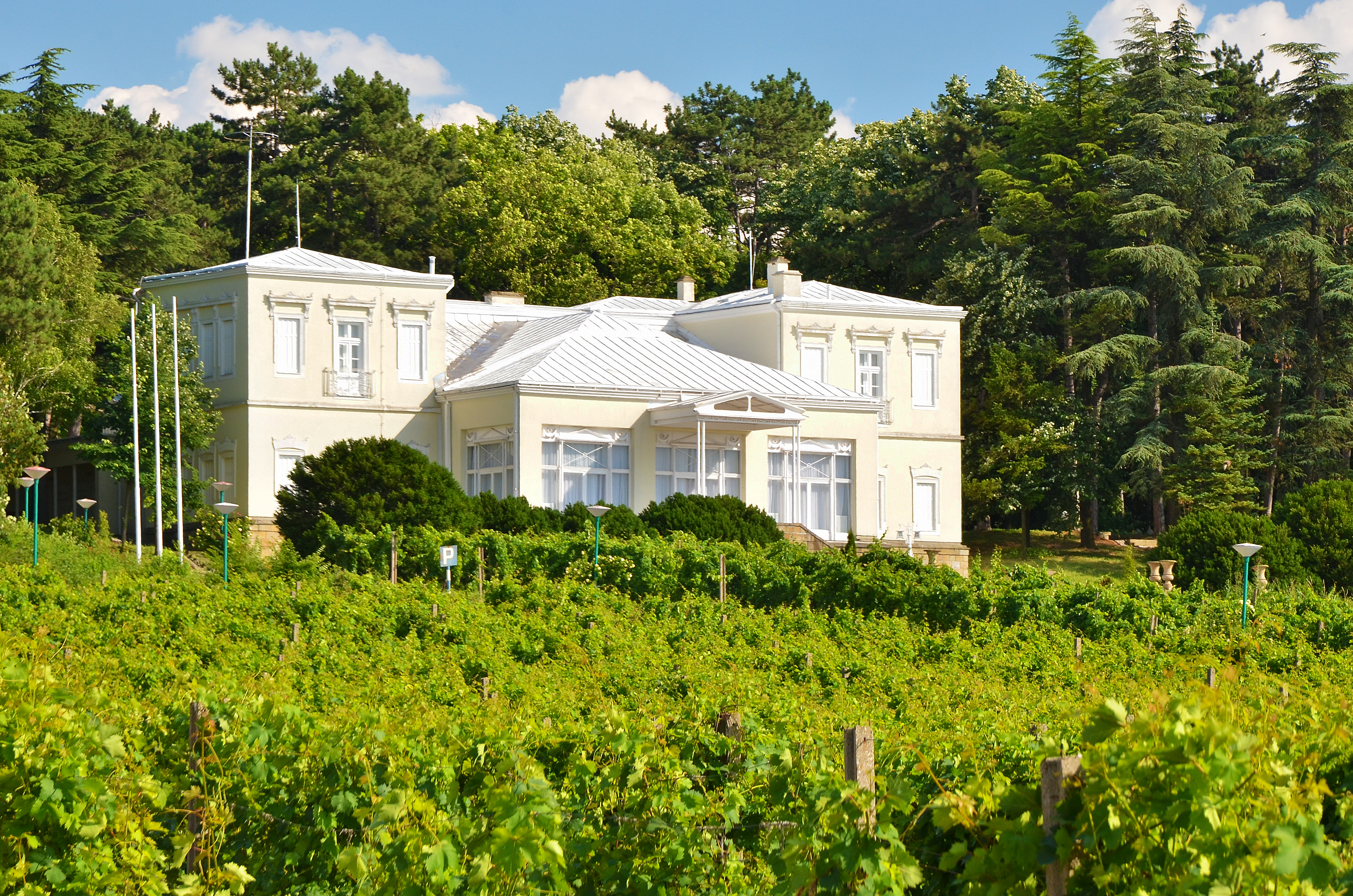
Prince Mihailo's summer residence in Smederevo

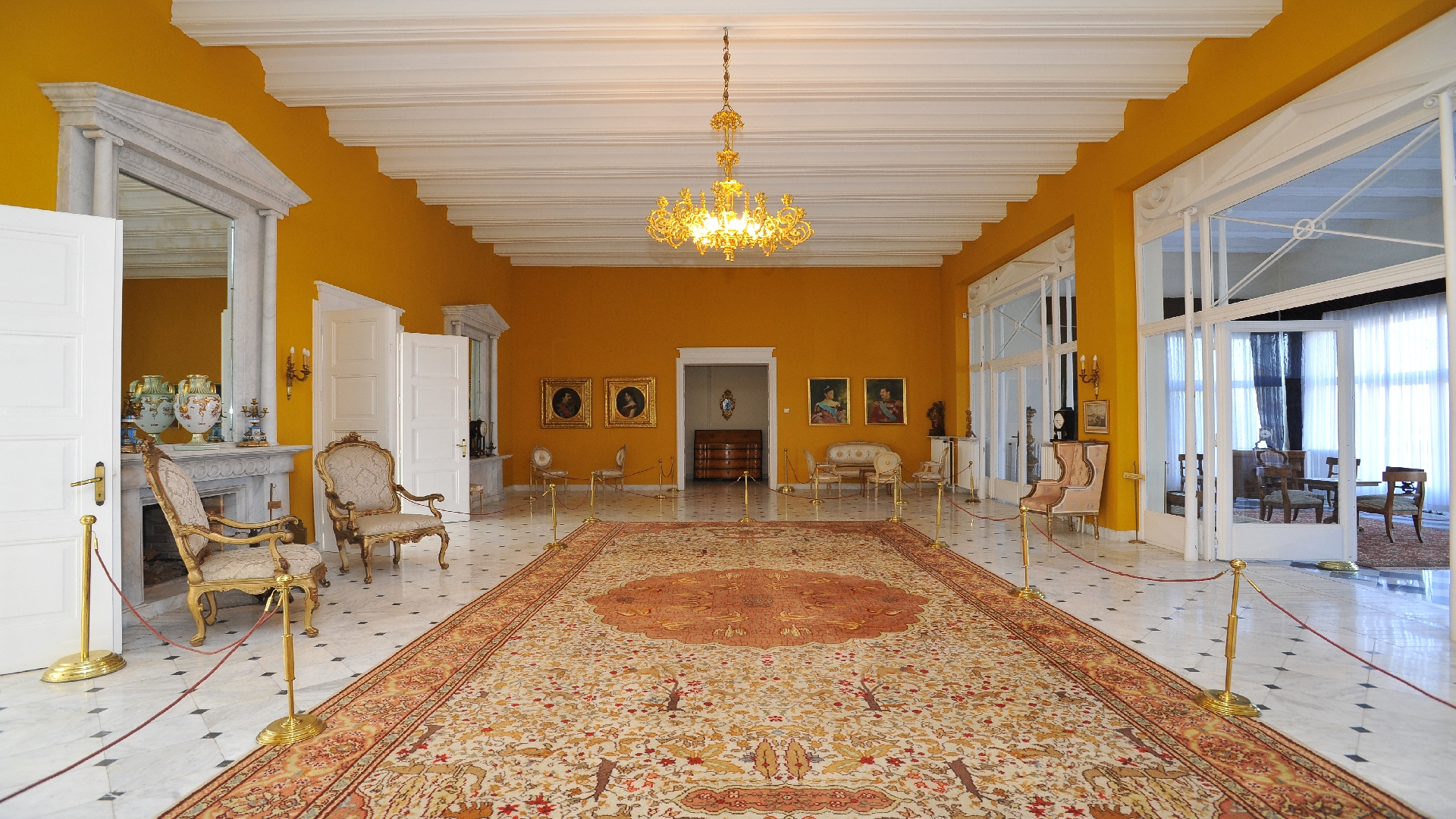
Interior of summer villa in Smederevo

== See also ==
- Čukur Fountain
- Treaty of Vöslau

Mihailo Obrenović, Prince of Serbia House of Obrenović Born: September 16 1823 Died: 10 June 1868
Regnal titles
Preceded by Milan Obrenović II	Prince of Serbia; 1839–1842	Succeeded by Aleksandar Karađorđević
Preceded by Miloš Obrenović I	Prince of Serbia; 1860–1868	Succeeded by Milan Obrenović IV
