= Velimir Mihailo Teodorović =

Serbian philanthropist (1849–1898)

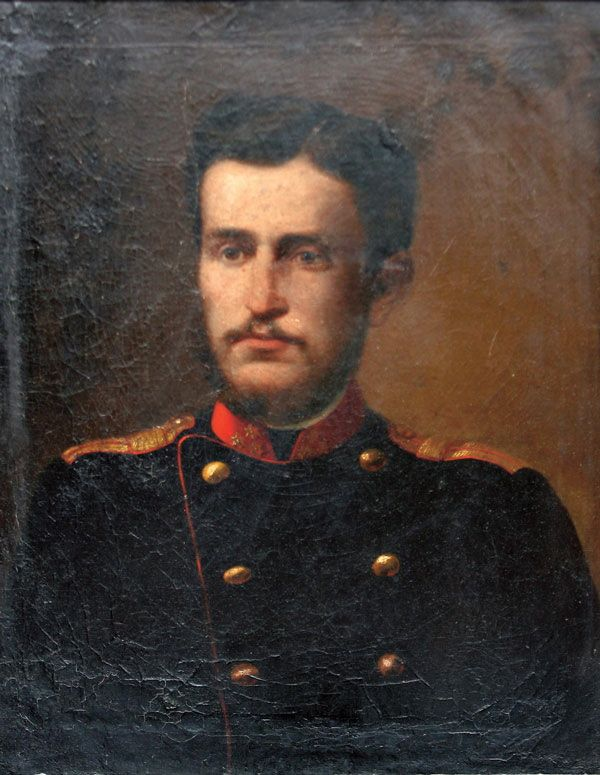
- Velimir Teodorovic, painted by Stevan Todorović in 1869
- Born: May 8, 1849
- Died: January 31, 1898 (aged 48)
- Occupation: Philanthropist

Velimir Mihailo Teodorović (Rogaška Slatina, 8 May 1849 – Munich, 31 January 1898) was a Serbian philanthropist, endowment holder and an illegitimate descendant of the House of Obrenović, ruling family of the Kingdom of Serbia.

== Biography ==
Young Velimir Teodorović

Velimir Mihailo Teodorović was born as an illegitimate child of Serbian Prince Mihailo Obrenović and seventeen-year-old girl, Maria Berghaus (1831-1863) from Styria. Maria's father worked as a marven doctor (badenmeister) in a spa in Rogaška Slatina. The prince frequented the spa in 1848 and became close to Maria during these visits. Their son was baptized in the Catholic Church as William. The love between his parents did not last long.

Mihailo bought a house in Vienna for Maria and his son, gave her a dowry, and paid alimony for the child through his Viennese banker Tirke. Four years later, she married a certain Dr. Schuster, who saw in Velimir only a source of income and influenced Maria to ask for more and more money to support herself. Due to the large debts for which the doctor is responsible, the house was put up for sale in order to settle debts. The house was bought by the banker Tirke at the will of the prince and now placed in Velimir's name. Dissatisfied with this situation, especially with Velimir's education, his father brought him to Belgrade in 1857. Velimir first lived with Antonije Anta Radivojevic, Mihail's manager of the property. Antonije's wife Sofija tried to replace Velimir's mother, and her son Živko was like a brother to him.

Despite the fact that Velimir initially spoke only German, he was enrolled in the primary school near the St. Michael's Cathedral, where he studied solidly. On the advice of the personal physician and trustee of Prince Mihailo, Dr. Karol Pacek, Velimir Mihailo Teodorović was enrolled in the school of Stevan Todorović in 1861, together with Stevan's nephew Jovan Stojšić and Živko Radivojević. At that time, Velimir Mihailo was assigned a personal valet, Teodor Petković, who did the job for life. From his students from the painting school, Steva Todorović formed the "First Serbian Gymnastics and Wrestling Company", of which Velimir was a member, as well as the sons of other high-ranking civil servants and prominent citizens of Belgrade. The company organized public classes with exercises, wrestling and various competitions, and Prince Mihailo Obrenović was delighted with this idea and helped to level the land, fence and make wooden exercise equipment near the buildings of the Royal Academy.

At the suggestion of Ilija Garašanin, Velimir then continued to study in the house of Professor Milutin Stojanović, who passed on his love for theatre, literature and art. During the summer holidays, the professor took them to Italy, Switzerland or France, to get to know the landscapes and people. Velimir was accompanied by a group of students, including Živko Radivojević.

Velimir visited Princess Julia more often than his father, with whom he was in the evening in the billiard room in the basement of the old court. The prince was very reserved towards him, fearing that he would spoil him with excessive attention, which was a common custom at that time, especially with male children.

When he turned seventeen (1866), at his father's urging, he converted to the Orthodox faith. The godfather at his baptism was Metropolitan Mihailo of Belgrade. At his baptism, he was named Velimir Teodorović. Teodorović was the old surname of Obrenović dynasty. Since then, he has always signed himself as Velimir Mihailo (after his father) Teodorović.

He grew into a young man that looked very much like his father, both in stature and character, as well as in the color of his voice, movements and nature. He loved poetry and was an avid rider and swordsman.

After completing his high school education in Serbia in 1867 he was enrolled in the private high school of Professor Olivier near Geneva. Along with his personal valet, he was accompanied by the prince's aide-de-camp Aleksandar Protić. It was there that he last met his father, who was returning from the World's Fair in Paris, and on that occasion, he received a diamond ring, of exceptional value and beauty. At that time, the prince gave up his intention to publicly recognize him as the son of the heir, as he intended to marry Katarina Konstantinović, expecting a legal heir.

After his father's death, in the assassination in Košutnjak in 1868, since there was no will, at the request of Metropolitan Mihailo, the governor and the prince's sister Petria Bajić of Varadija (1810-180), he was immediately brought to Belgrade, he was given an inheritance, bordered on the Danube and had its own port, in Lesser Wallachia, and Romanian bonds worth 30,000 ducats, thus securing its future. As Velimir or (as he was officially called) "Prince Mihajlo's cadet" was a minor, he was assigned three guardians: Metropolitan Mihajlo, President of the Court of Cassation Đorđe Petrović and President of the National Assembly Živko Karabiberović. He was sent from Belgrade to the inherited estate and then continued his studies in Munich. He studied agronomy first, it was thought that this knowledge would be useful for him to manage the properties in Lesser Wallachia. He then reoriented himself to chamber sciences (economics and politics).

He became an adult at the age of 21 in 1870 and entered the possession of Negoi. The rest of the relatives were intolerant of him, as they feared he would try to take over the throne, although he never showed any pretensions of doing so.

== Velimirianum ==
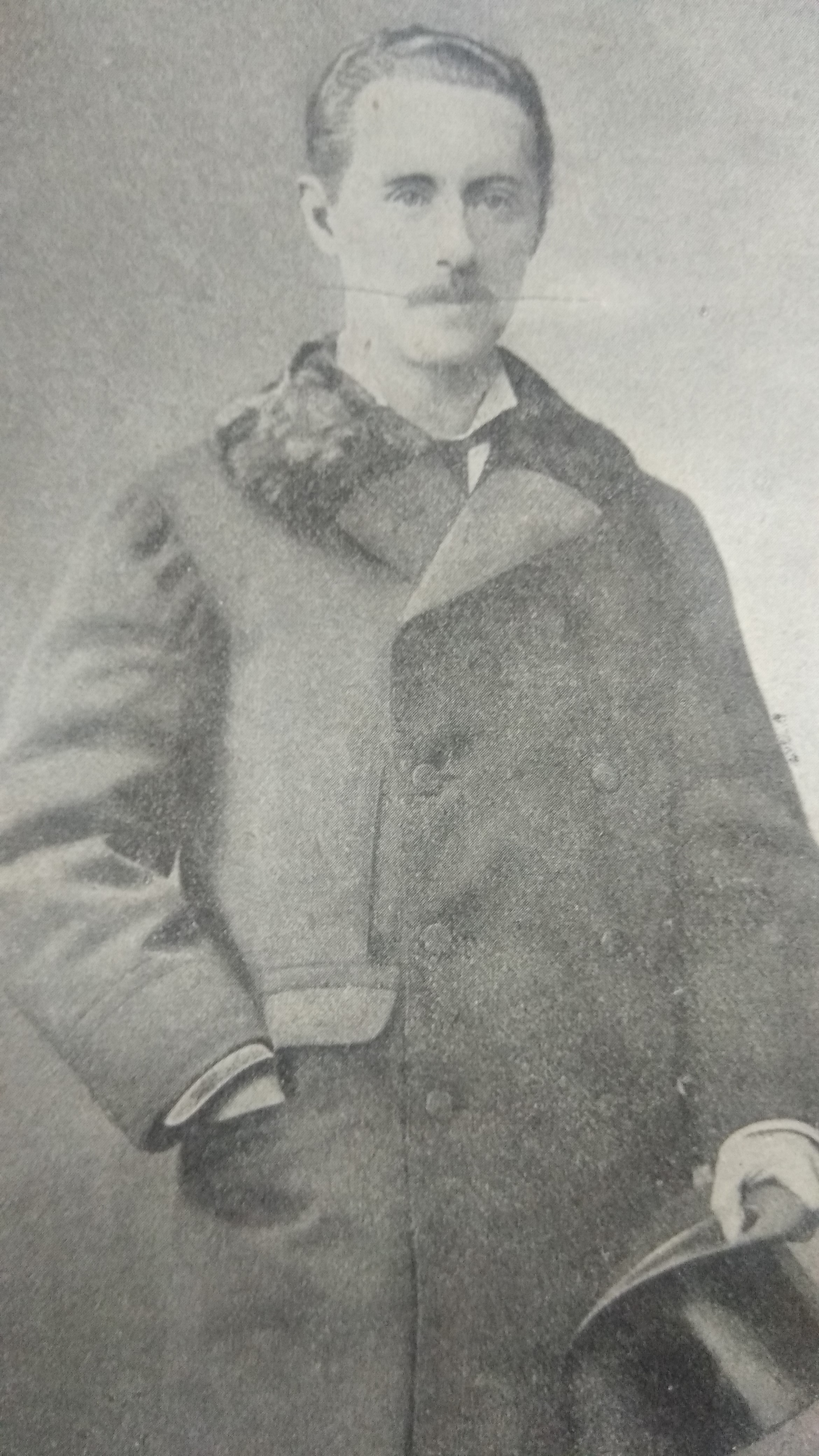
Photo of Velimir Teodorović, published in 1910

He is the only member of the Obrenović family to donate his property to Serbia. According to the will from 1889, he appointed the Kingdom of Serbia as the sole heir of all his movable and immovable property. The will was supplemented in 1893, according to which he left a legacy to his half-sister Teresa Schuster, in the form of a sum that was to be paid to her for life in German marks, which was done until 1944. According to his wishes, his property was to be separated from the state property, as an endowment, under the name Velimirianum, with the aim of helping the development of science, art, trade, industry and crafts. For the management of the endowment and the use of its fund, it was determined that the state council be the sole and exclusive executor.

Only ten years after his death, the remains of his property could be used in terms of a will. In the meantime, there were discussions about the inheritance, which the state had to lead before the Romanian courts, while closer and further descendants of the Obrenović family appeared as possible heirs, who disputed the establishment of the endowment, among them the most persistent were the descendants of Mihailo's sister Petrija, and then Queen Natalia, as the heiress of King Alexander, who asked for a sum of 30,000 ducats with 6% interest. The state managed to reach a settlement with all interested heirs at great expense of the endowment, while the property of Negoi in the Dolj district had to be sold in 1904 based on the judgment of the Romanian authorities, of which the State Council received a total of about 1,700,000 dinars. gold, together with arrears of property.

In 1905, King Peter Karađorđević signed the Law on the Work of the Endowment, which enabled the State Council to determine the manner of handling the endowment. The State Council published a report on the condition of the Endowment, on its revenues and expenditures in the past year, and every year on behalf of Velimirianum, the board announced a competition in daily newspapers to receive assistance. The first manager of the endowment was Nikola Pašić. Later, the endowment was managed by the Serbian company Privrednik. With the funds of the endowment, the remains of Velimir Mihailo Teodorović were transferred to the New Cemetery in Belgrade. From 1935 to 1940, a number of humanitarian and charitable institutions regularly received funds for their activities, and the Serbian Academy of Sciences and Arts and the University of Belgrade received the same grants. In addition, every year, Velimirianum bought books and magazines from various publishers, which was sent as a gift to high schools, teachers' colleges, rural schools, ministries and various other institutions, except for two copies which remained at the endowment library.

Of the total endowment income, ten percent was set aside for the improvement and beautification of the City of Belgrade.

The endowment worked well until 1945 when Tito's totalitarian regime took over.

Velimirianum came out of the Second World War badly damaged, and after the abolition of the State Council in 1945, the Ministry of Education, by order of the Presidency of the Government, took over the management of the endowment by a commission. Documents have been preserved that in 1957 the Secretariat for Education paid aid to the primary school in Gornji Milanovac and the editorial office of Decje novine at the same school and that the last aid from that fund was granted in 1971 to Srboljub Mitić, a peasant poet from the village of Crljenac near Požarevac. The endowment still exists today, but does not work.

Velimirianum had its building in Belgrade, at 11 Sveti Sava Street, near the Hotel Slavija - The name of the endowment is permanently written in copper letters at the main entrance of the building. The letters were later removed, leaving only the holes. A restaurant was later built on the ground floor, before it too shut down.

== Works cited ==
- Matović, Mariana (November 2004). "Dobroslav M. Ružić (1854-1918)" Доброслав М. Ружић (1854-1918) (PDF). Glas Biblioteke. 11: 65–98. Archived from the original (PDF) on August 15, 2016.
- Matović, Dragana (September 21, 2014). "Portret sina kneza Mihaila krije tajnu" Портрет сина кнеза Михаила крије тајну. Večernje novosti.
- Софронијевић, Мира (2003). Даривали су своме отечеству. Belgrade: Технологије, издаваштво и агенција Јанус. ISBN 978-86-907353-4-1.
- Павловић, Бранка (2007). Поруке времена прошлих Историја и традиција филантропије у Србији у XIX и XX веку (PDF). Belgrade: Балкански фонд за локалне иницијативе. ISBN 978-86-907353-4-1. Archived from the original (PDF) on 5 October 2016.
- Цветковић, Душан (2003). Последњи изданак династије Обреновић. Belgrade: НИП „Глас“ а.д. Archived from the original on 2022-02-16.
- Гордић, Гордана (2012). Задужбине (PDF). Краљево: Министарство културе и информисања, Народни музеј Краљево. Archived from the original (PDF) on 11 October 2016.
