= Society of Serbian Letters =

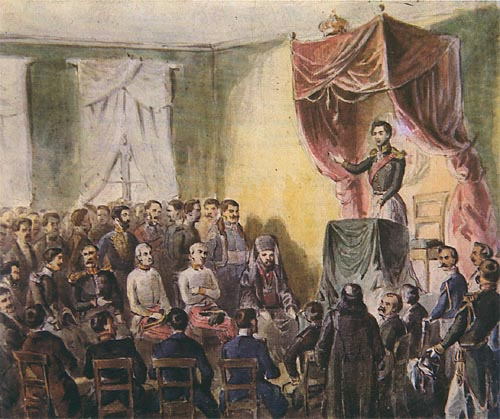
Prince Mihailo Obrenovic speaks to DSS members at the first session on June 8, 1842. Lithograph by Anastas Jovanovic

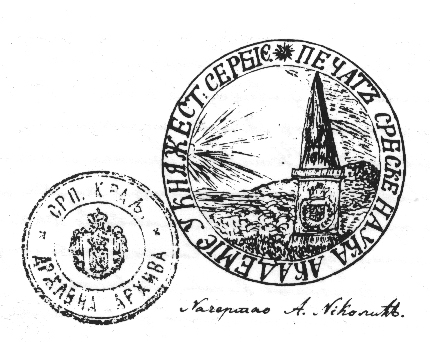
Draft seal of the Association of Serbian Slavs, drawing by A. Nikolić, 1841

Society of Serbian Letters (Serbian: Дружтво србске словесности, ДСС, romanized: Družtvo srbske slovesnosti, DSS), founded in 19 November 1841 and confirmed by the seal and signature of prince Mihailo Obrenović.

== Establishment ==
The founders were Jovan Sterija Popović and Atanasije Nikolić. The first members, apart from them, were Dimitrije Isailović, Stefan Marković, Jovan Stejić, Dimitrije P. Tirol, Sima Milutinović Sarajlija and Isidor Stojanović and later Ignjat Vjekoslav Brlić. The task of the society was to spread the sciences in Serbian language and to improve the Serbian vernacular. The president of the Association by position was Minister of Education.

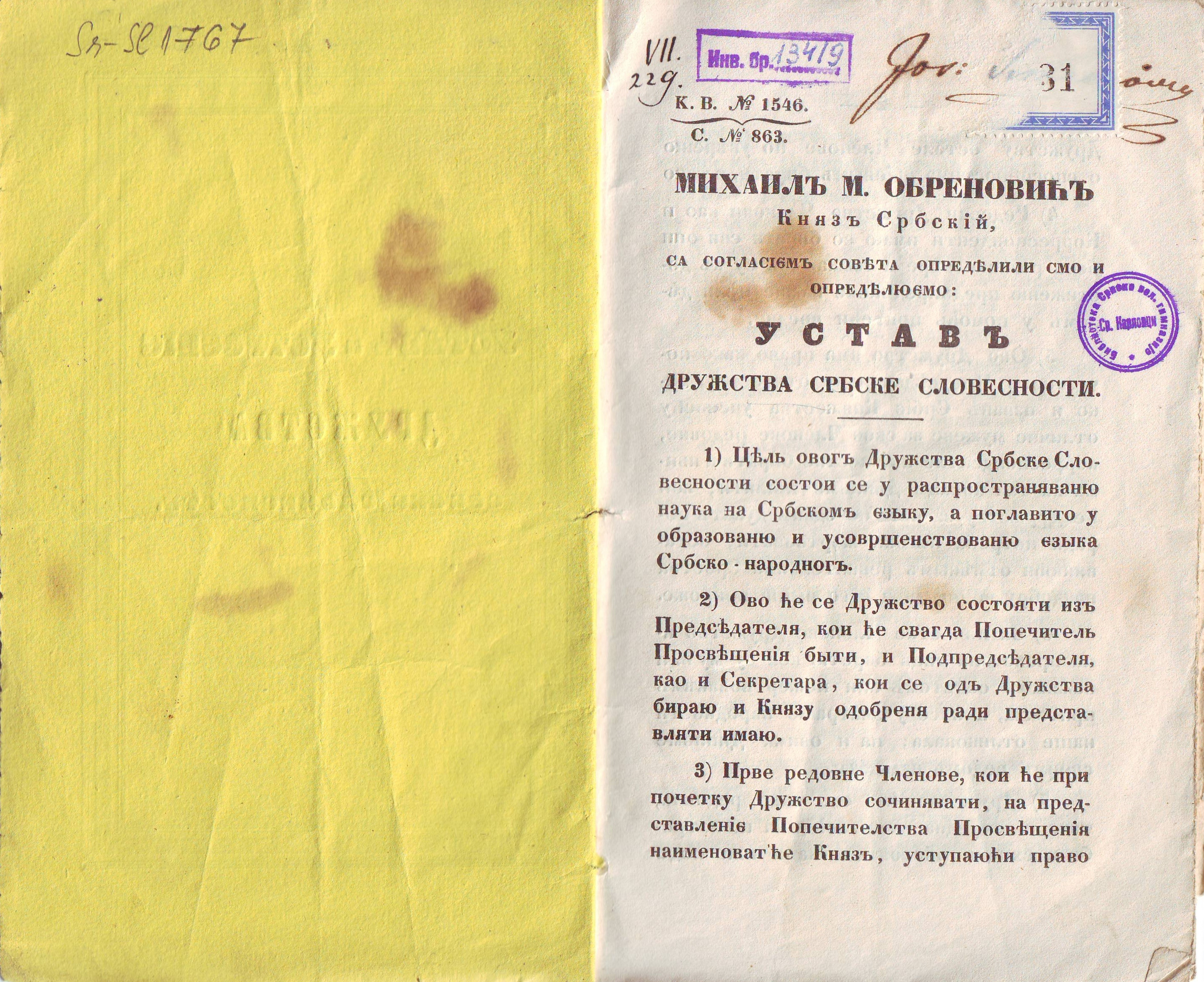
The first page of the Constitution of the Society of Serbian Literature

Right at the beginning, the Society tried to solve the then still unresolved issue of spelling and adopted an alphabet of 35 letters. The work was interrupted in August 1842, due to riots in the country, and resumed only in August 1844. Since then, the Society has been working on the "Linguistic Dictionary" and school textbooks, but soon stopped working on the dictionary, especially because of the protest Vuk Karadžić. After that, the Society worked on collecting historical data and articles, reviewed various works of its members, gave them to members to make a school book.

In "Novine Srbske" of 1846, the work program of the Society and its newsletter was published. The magazine "Glasnik Drustva Srpske" slovenosti started to be published in 1847. Within the Gazette, there is a space for: Serbian history and antiquities, geography, state writing (statistics) and Serbian natural history, and works in the field of other sciences. From the second issue, Glasnik regularly published sources, and from the fifth 1855 he began to follow domestic and later foreign publications. During its existence, in the period 1847 - 1863 the Society published 17 issues of the Herald.

The Society of Serbian Literature has published several books and cooperated in lifting the ban on Vuk's spelling. Although as early as 1848 it was requested to abandon the spelling imposed by the provision from 1832, and the editorial board of the newspaper kept the old one, the Society did not do much to improve the language. He started publishing the first texts written in Vuk's language and spelling of Serbian philologist, translator, linguistic historian and lexicographer Đuro Daničić.

The most significant works published in the Gazette are Serbian Historical Monuments of the Venetian Archive, which was prepared by Janko Šafarik in the period 1859 - 1862 as well as the chrysostom of Emperor Stefan Dušan of Monastery of the Holy Archangel near Prizren and published in 1862.

== Termination ==
Liberals tried to use the Society of Serbian Literature for their theoretical liberalism. The Society on 26 January 1864 had its annual meeting at which they proposed Garibaldi and Hercez as new members of the Society.

27 January 1864 the Society of Serbian Literature was abolished by Prince Michael.

29 July 1864 was renewed under the name Serbian learned society.

== See also ==
- Belgrade Lyceum
- National Museum (Belgrade)
- Serbian Academy of Science and Arts

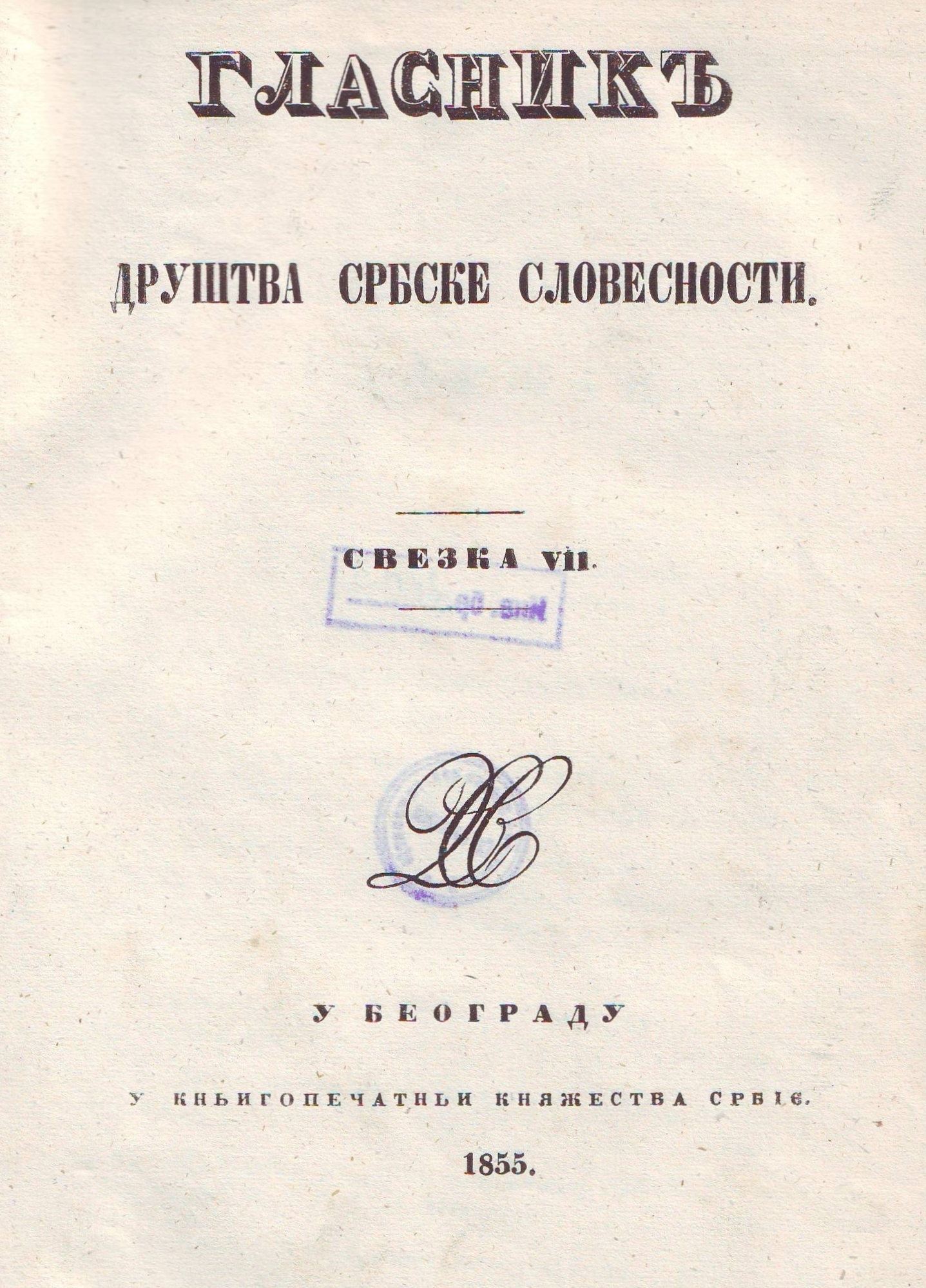
Front page of the seventh volume of the Gazette of the Society of Serbian Literature (1855)

== Sources ==
- Šafarik, Janko (1859). Srbski istoriski spomenici mletačkog arhiva XI. Belgrade.
- Šafarik, Janko (1862). Srbski istoriski spomenici mletačkog arhiva XV. Belgrade.
- Jovanović, Slobodan (1933). Ustavobranitelji i njihova vlada, 1838-1858. Izdavačka knjižarnica Gece Kona.
- Fostikov, Aleksandra (1999). Bibliografija objavljenih istorijskih izvora u Glasniku DSS-a odnosnu SUD-a (1846-1864/65-1892). Istorijski institut Beograd.
- Хронологија Друштва српске словесности (1841-1864) [Chronology of the Serbian Literary Society (1841-1864)]. Српска академија наука и уметности (in Serbian). Archived from the original on 2016-03-05.
