= Johann Böss =

Viennese artist (1822–1887)

- Johann Böss (c. 1850)
- Born: 1823
- Died: 1887 (aged 63–64)
- Known for: portraits of notable Serbian people
- Scientific career
- Workplaces: Austria, Hungary, Serbia

Johann Böss (Pest, 1822 – 1887) was a Austrian Viennese portrait painter and draftsman. In 1846 he painted numerous portraits of famous personalities from Serbia, including the Obrenovićs, the Karađorđevićs, as well as the Anastas Jovanović family.

== Life ==
He completed his painting studies at the Academy in Vienna, where Anastas Jovanović was also at the time, which is where their acquaintance and collaboration originated. He studied at the academy from 1839 to 1843.

In 1845, Jovanović came up with the project of publishing "Spomenike Serbska" ("Споменике Сербске"; Serbian Monuments), with which he would preserve from oblivion the most important figures and events from Serbian history since ancient times. In 1850, Jovanović had his own workshop in Vienna, and since he made all his lithographs from his own photographs or oil paintings by other painters, Böss was an associate who went to Serbia to portray the sought-after figures..

Jovanović's daughter Katarina stated that her father did not paint portraits himself, but "had a skilled portraitist, Johann Böss, to do it; he sent him to Serbia several times when he needed a portrait of a person beyond the reach of his photographic lens."

From 1846 he began working on portraits and copies of paintings in Serbia. In 1861, he became a member of the Wiener Künstlerhaus.

== Works ==
Many of his works have been lost, but their titles have survived:

- two portraits of Proto Matija Nenadović from 1846 (the first disappeared in World War I , and the second is registered as the work of an unknown painter - it is in the University Library in Belgrade )
- Karađorđe (made according to a copy by V. M. Borovikovsky)
- Prince Miloš (based on the work of the Austrian painter Einzel)
- Princess Ljubica (according to the painting by Pavel Đurković )
- portrait of Princess Julia

He also painted a portrait of Anastas Jovanović in 1858 (the only one signed by the painter with J. Böss 858) and his entire family, which stood in Jovanović's house at Kosovska 25, all today in the Belgrade City Museum)

- Portrait of mother Marija Jovanović around 1845 - 1855 , exhibited on the first floor of Princess Ljubica's residence in Belgrade
- Portrait of Katarina Hadži-Popović's sister, circa 1850. Katarina was married to the Supreme Court's cassation judge Nikola Hadži-Popović, after whom the Belgrade neighborhood of Hadžipopovac is named.
- portrait of son Konstantin Jovanović as a boy, circa 1852 -1855

For Jovanović he also painted a large representative portrait of Prince Mihailo Obrenović (circa 1860 ), which also stood in the salon of Jovanović's house. Today it is owned by the Belgrade City Museum , exhibited on the first floor in the residence of Princess Ljubica.

- Some of his works were based on photographs by Anastas Jovanović, including:
- Njegoš ( 1847. Museum in Cetinje )
- Njegoš's brother Pero Tomov (1847. Museum in Cetinje)
- Stevan Knićanin
- Prince Alexander Karađorđević
- Prince Mihailo , 1847.
- Tsar Nicholas I Pavlovich

== Gallery ==
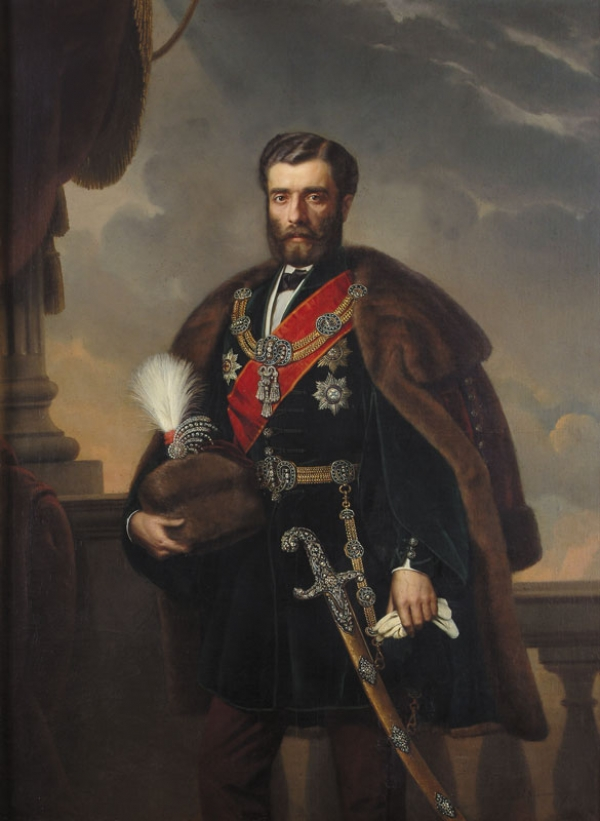
Mihailo Obrenović, 1860.

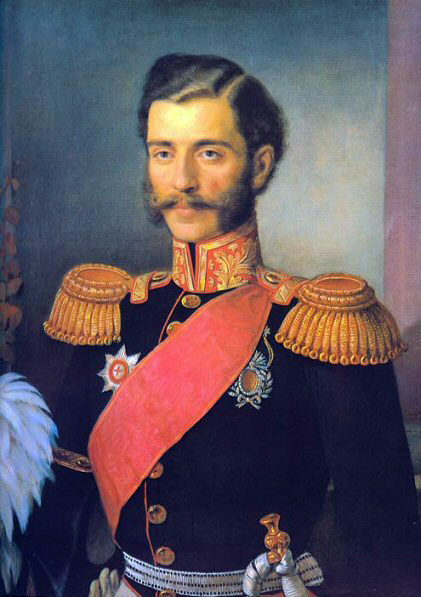
Mihailo Obrenović, 1856.

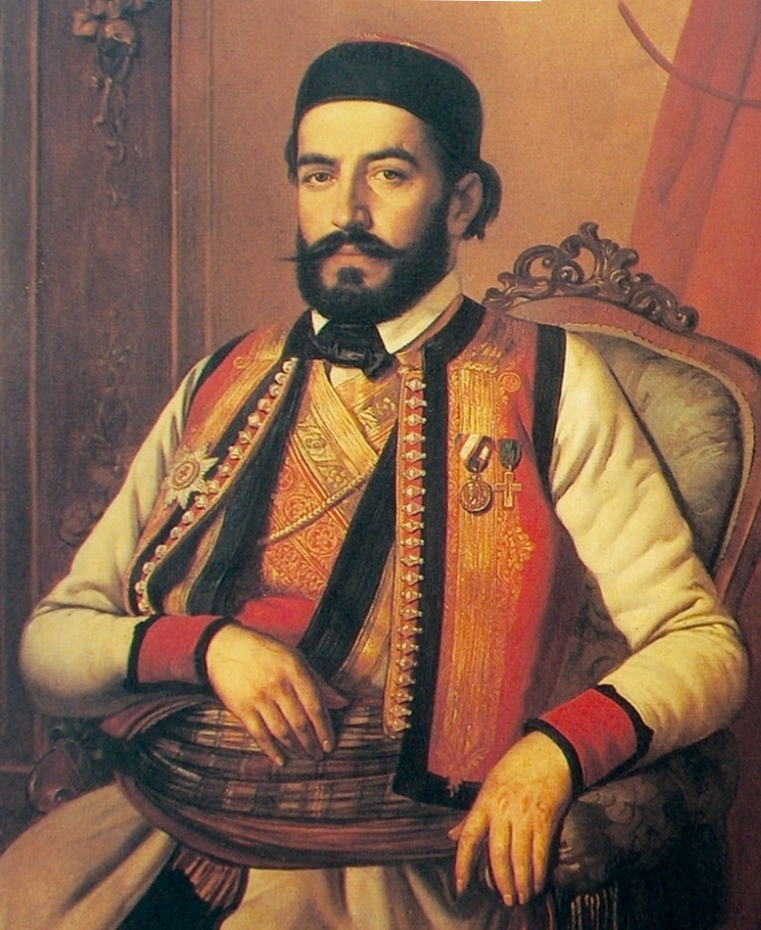
Petar II Petrović Njegoš, 1847.

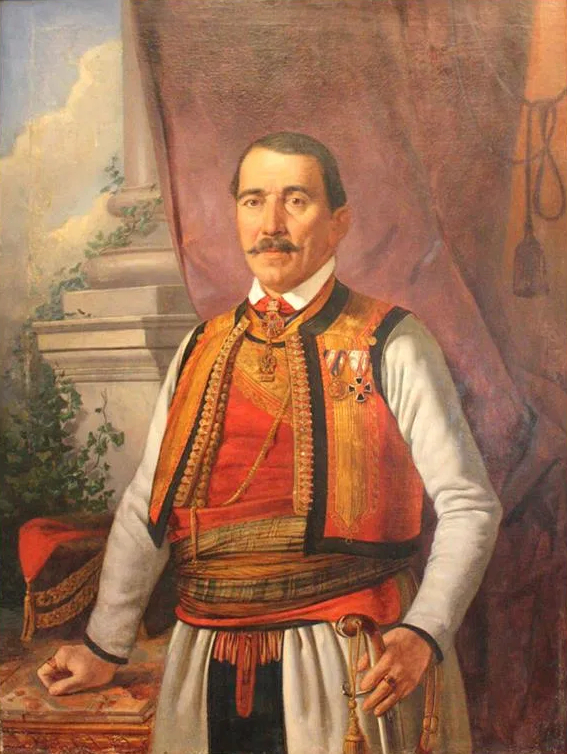
Pero Tomov Petrović Njegoš, 1847.

Tsar Nikolas I, 1850.

Lute player, 1856.
