= Alexander Berghaus =

German otorhinolaryngologist (born 1952)

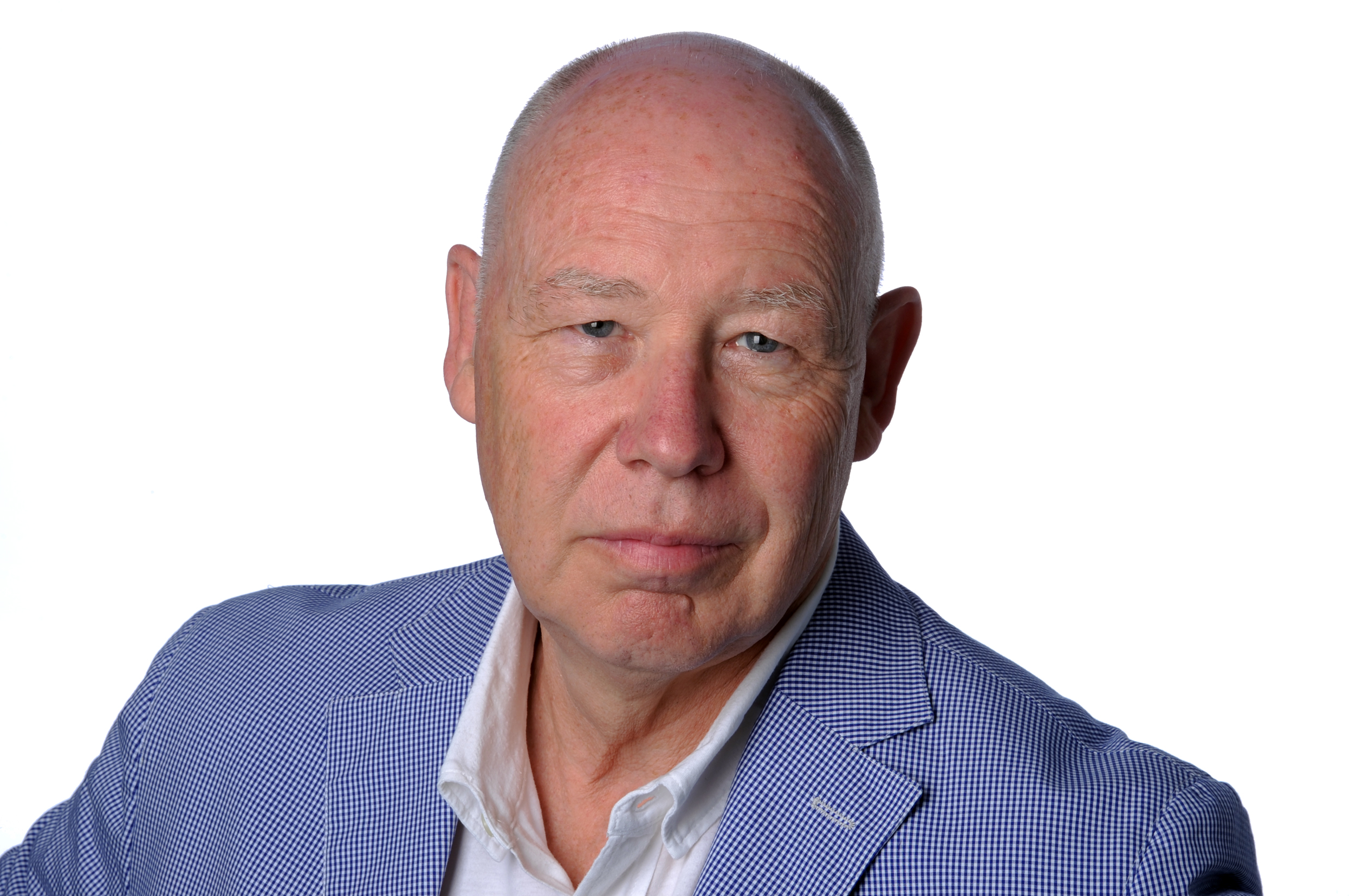
- Born: 9 January 1952 (age 74)
- Scientific career
- Fields: Otorhinolaryngology, head and neck surgery, and especially facial plastic surgery
- Workplaces: LMU Munich

Alexander Berghaus is a German specialist in otorhinolaryngology and a university professor of otorhinolaryngology at LMU Munich.

From 1993 to 2003, he was a director of the department of otorhinolaryngology, face and neck surgery, and professor of the department of otorhinolaryngology at the Martin Luther University of Halle-Wittenberg. He was dean at the medical faculty there in 1994 and pro-dean from 1996 to 1998. Since 2003 he has been director of the department of otorhinolaryngology at the LMU Klinikum and professor of otorhinolaryngology at LMU Munich.

Berghaus worked on polyethylene prosthetics for the trachea, ear reconstruction and other uses over his career. He also invented and patented instruments for rhinoplasty that were licensed to Karl Storz GmbH.

With G. Rettinger and G. Böhme he authored a book: Hals-Nasen-Ohren-Heilkunde Hippokrates Verlag, Stuttgart 1996, ISBN 3-7773-0944-3.

In 2001 he became a member of the Academy of Sciences Leopoldina.
