= Berghaus (surname) =

Berghaus is a German language habitational surname meaning 'at the Berghaus' ("mountain house"). Notable people with the name include:

- Albert Berghaus (fl. 1869–1880), American illustrator
- Alexander Berghaus (1952), German otolaryngologist
- Heinrich Berghaus (1797–1884), German geographer and cartographer
- Hermann Berghaus (1828–1890), German cartographer
- Ruth Berghaus (1927–1996), German choreographer, opera and theatre director, and artistic director
