= Anastas Jovanović =

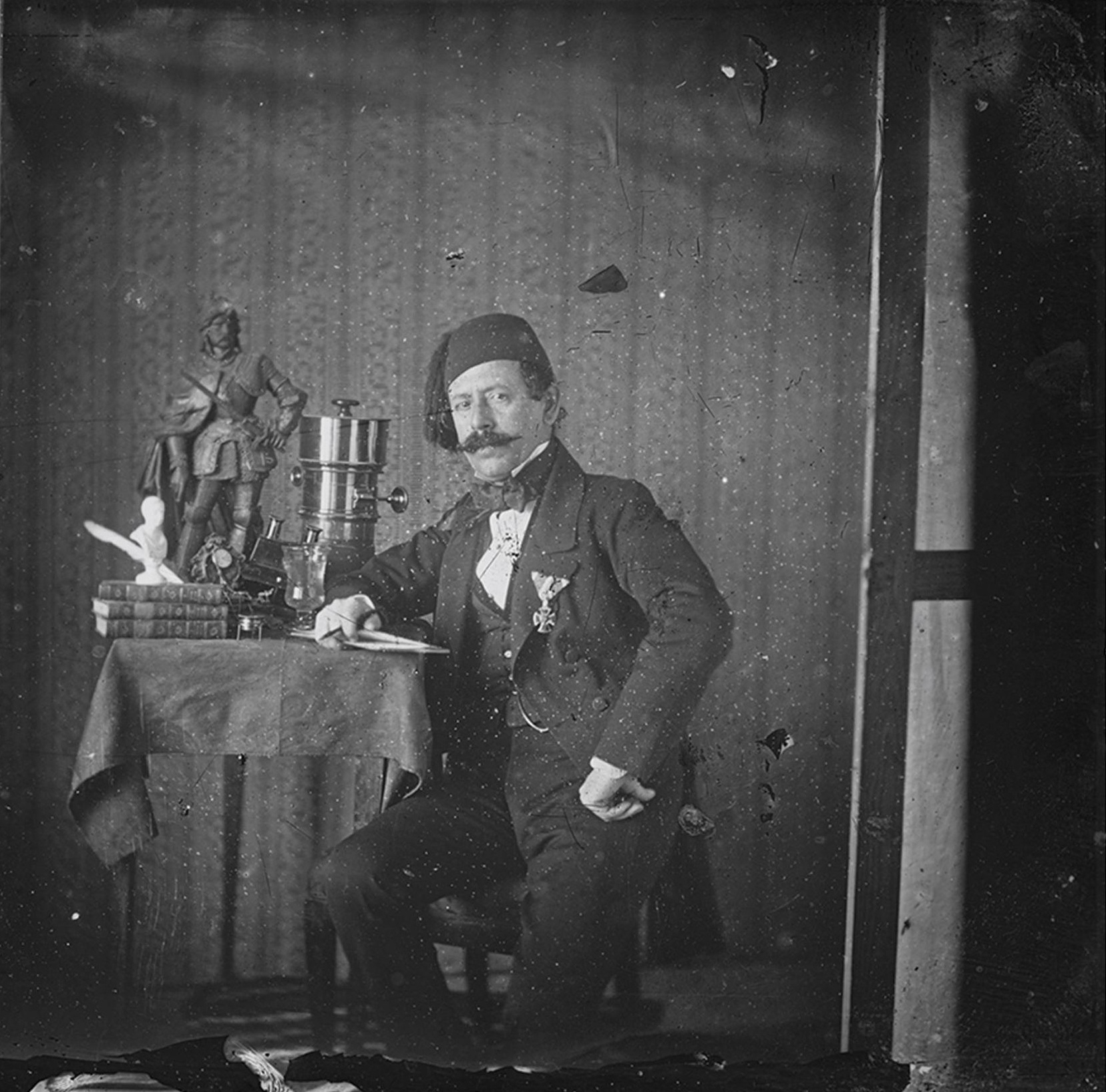
- Anastas Jovanović self-portrait c. 1854 (collodion).
- Born: 1817; Vratsa, Ottoman Empire
- Died: 1 November 1899 (aged 81–82); Belgrade, Kingdom of Serbia

Anastas Jovanović (Serbian Cyrillic: Анастас Јовановић, Bulgarian: Анастас Йованович 1817 – 1 November 1899) was a Serbian photographer and author of Bulgarian origin.

== Biography ==
Jovanović, was of Bulgarian origin and during his life he always felt himself a Bulgarian and at the same time a Serb. He was born in Vratsa, an important administrative and garrison city under Ottoman rule in 1817. When Anastas was 9 years old, his father sent him to continue his education in Belgrade, where his uncle worked at the Prince Obrenović sewing studio. In 1830, after the death of Anastas' father, his family moved to Belgrade. But only after one year his uncle who was their support died too.

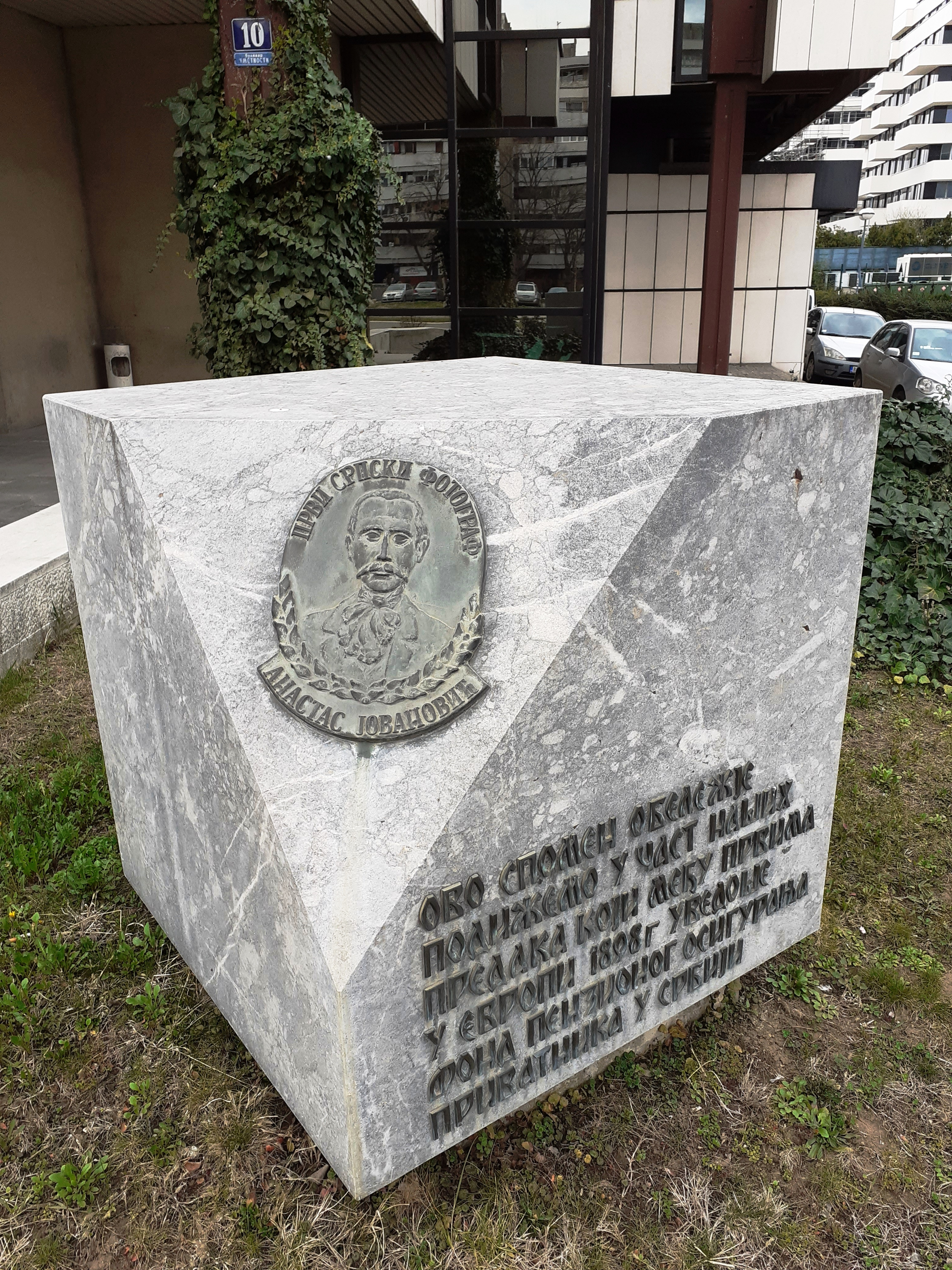
Monument to Anastas Jovanović in Belgrade

Anastas' son Konstantin Jovanović (1849–1923) was a prominent architect. Anastas's daughter Katarina Jovanović was a prominent Serbian to German translator.

He was awarded the Order of Prince Danilo I.

== Gallery ==
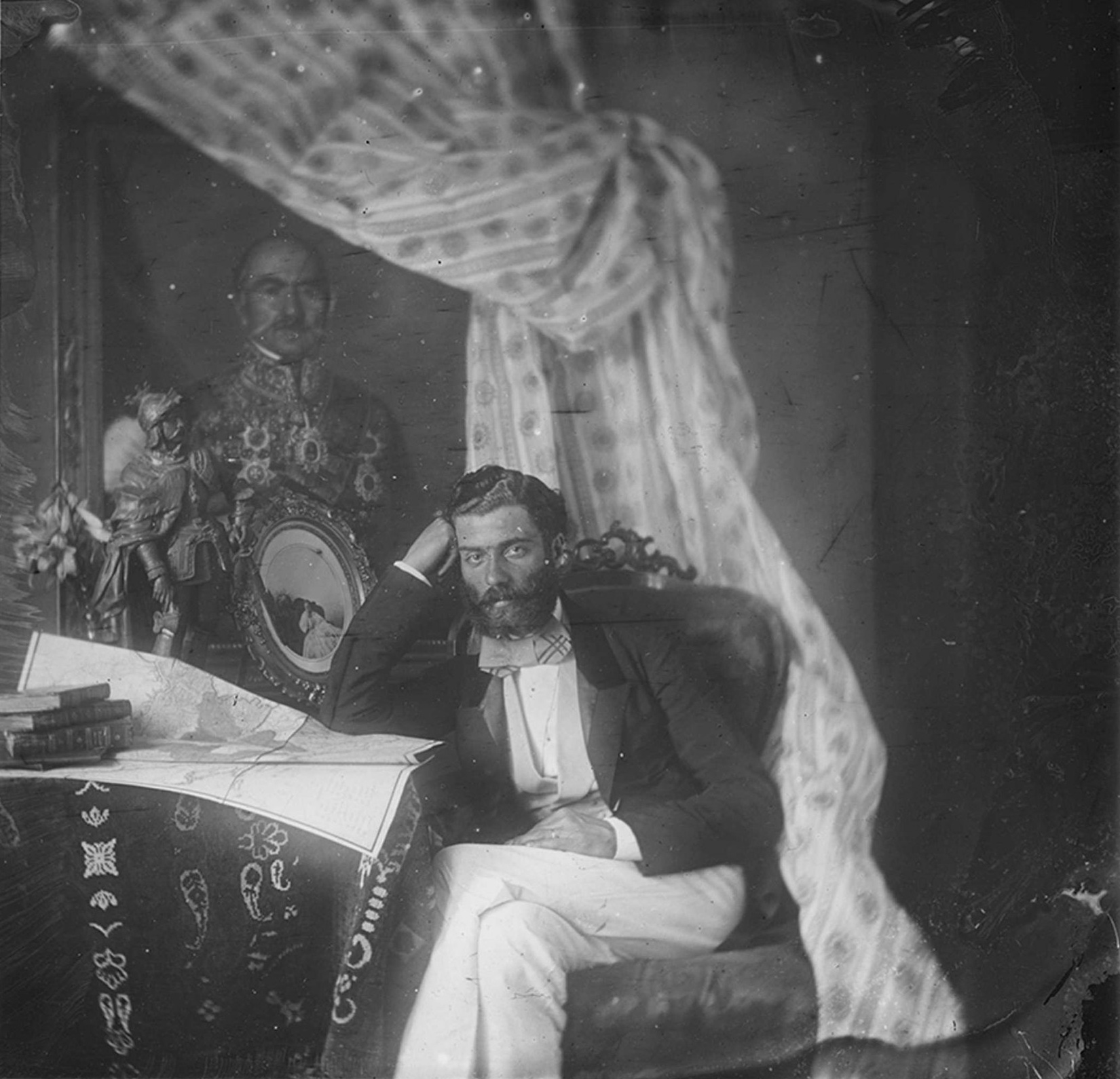
Prince Michael by Anastas c. 1856.

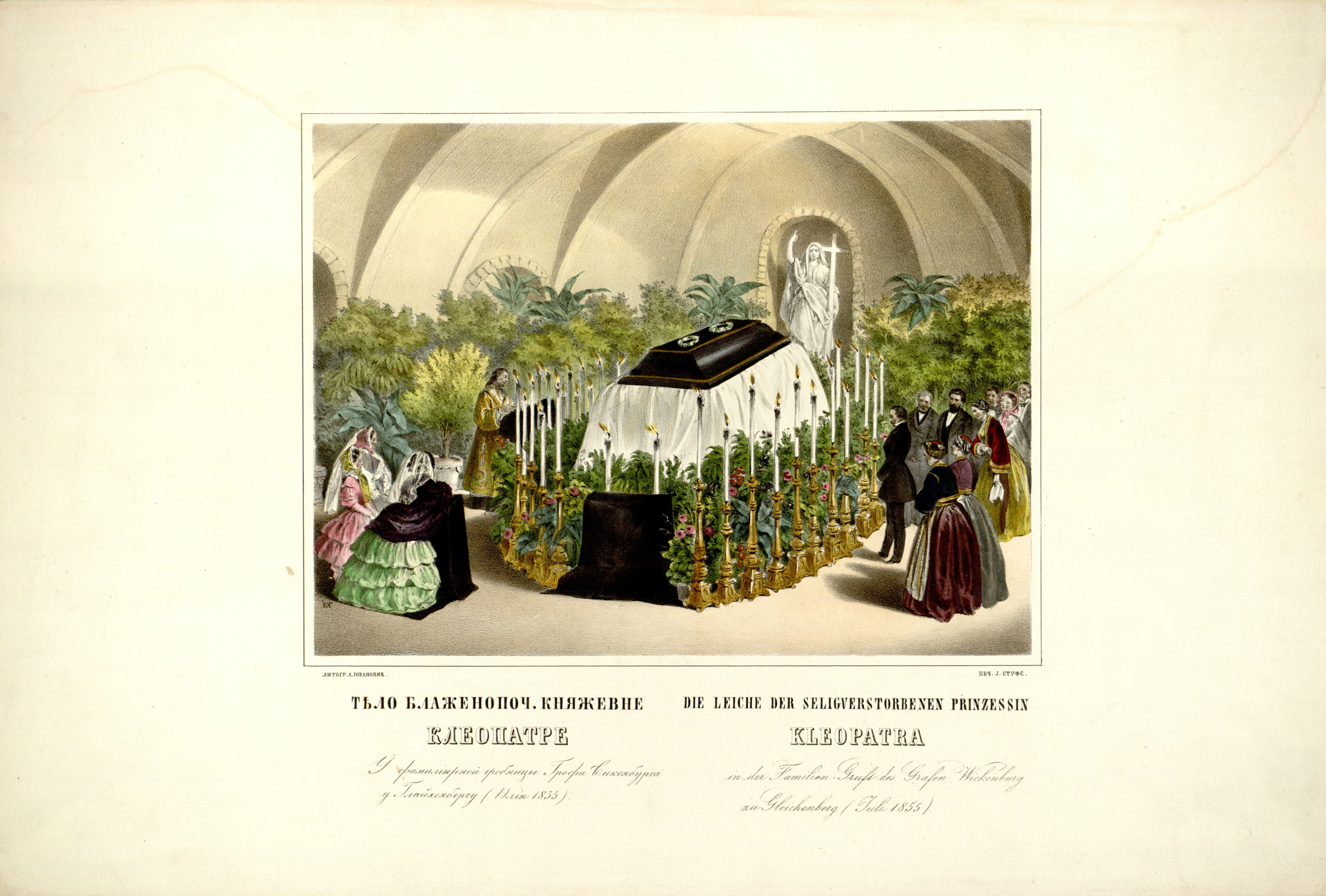
Corpse of late princess Kleopatra

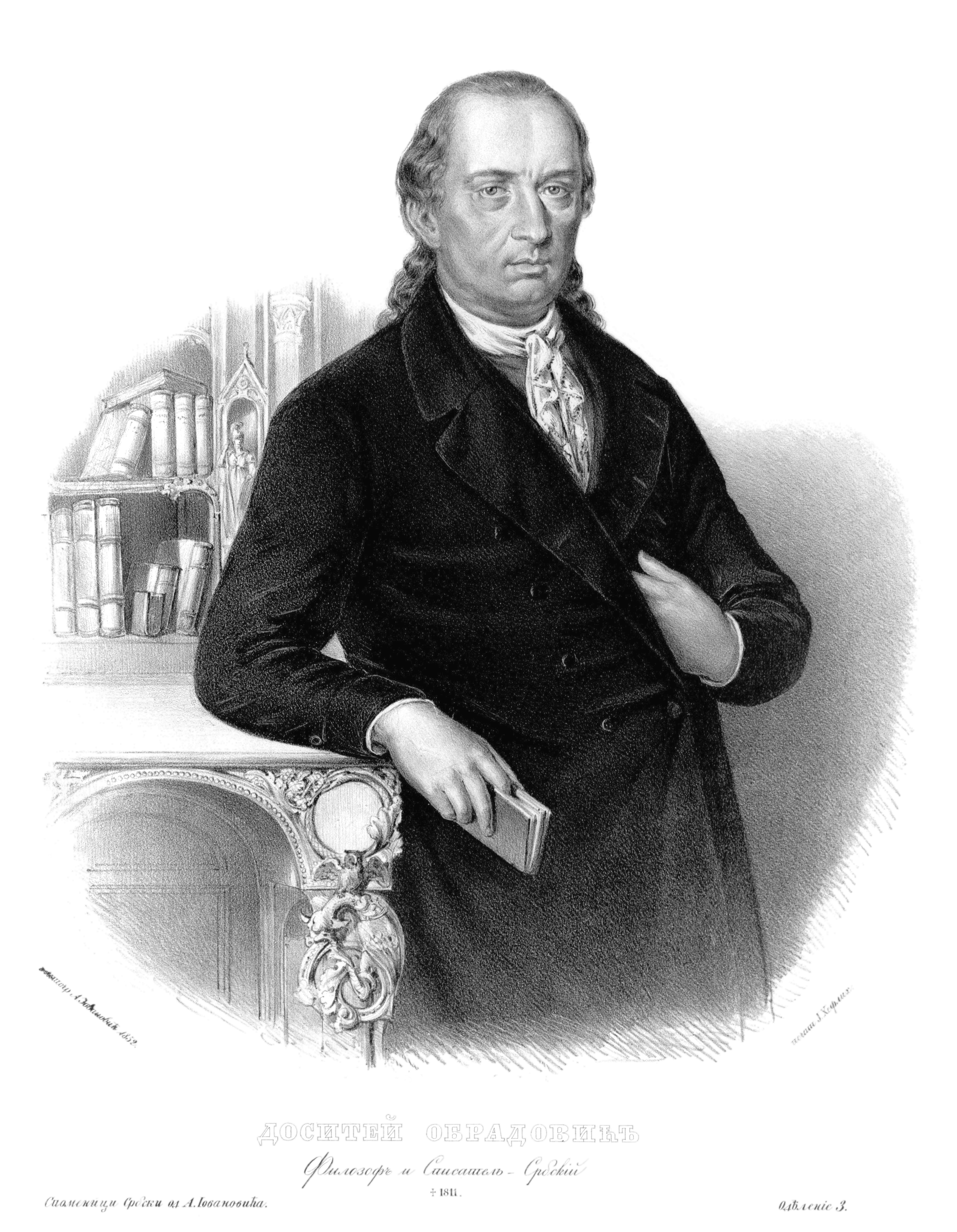
Portrait of Dositej Obradović

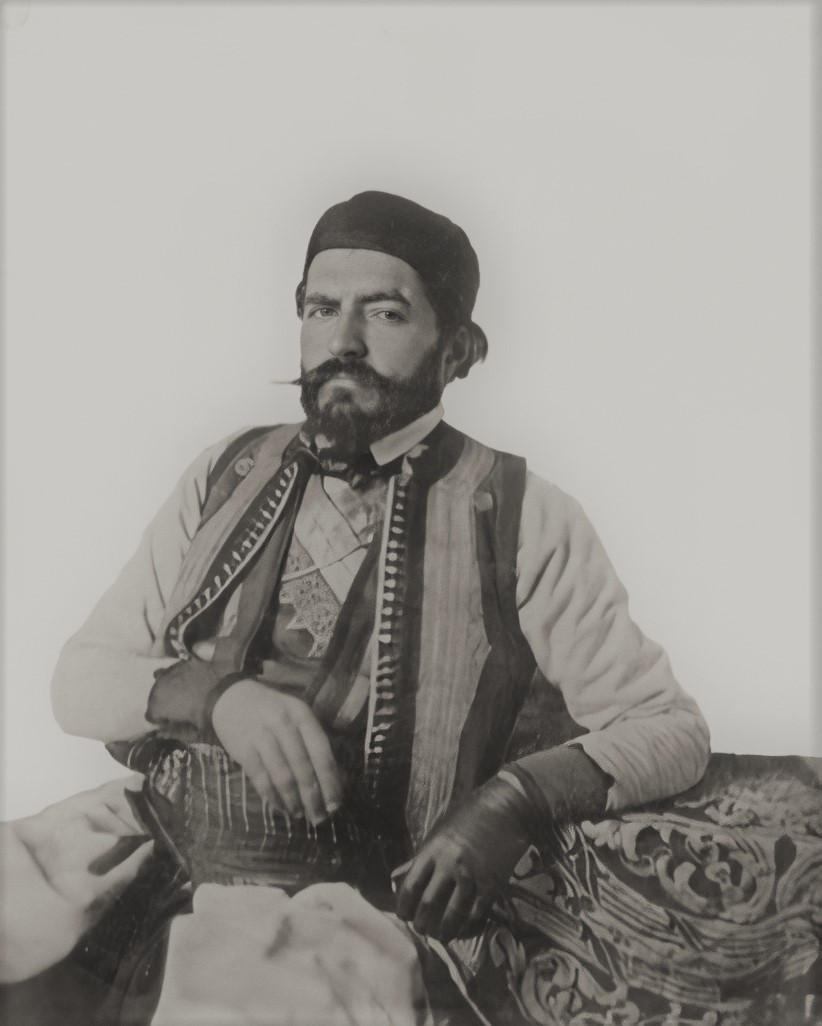
Petar II Petrović-Njegoš by Anastas c. 1851 (talbotype).

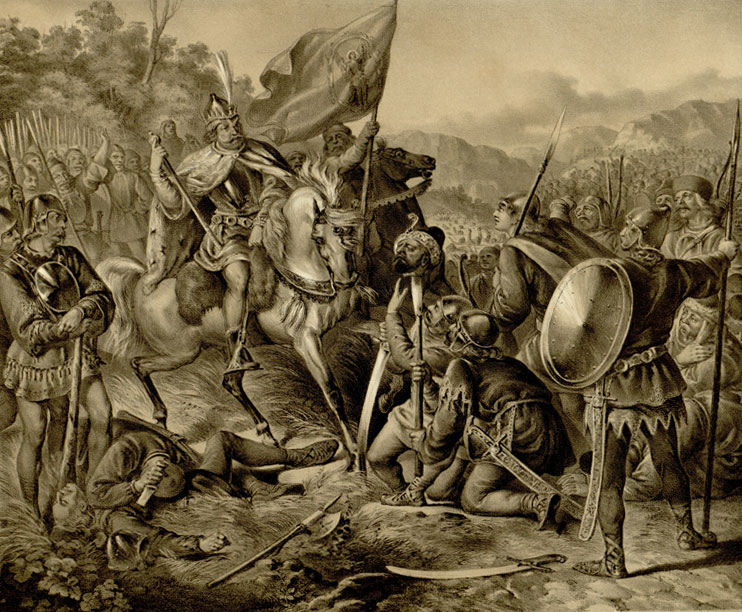
Victory of king Stefan Milutin over the Tatars

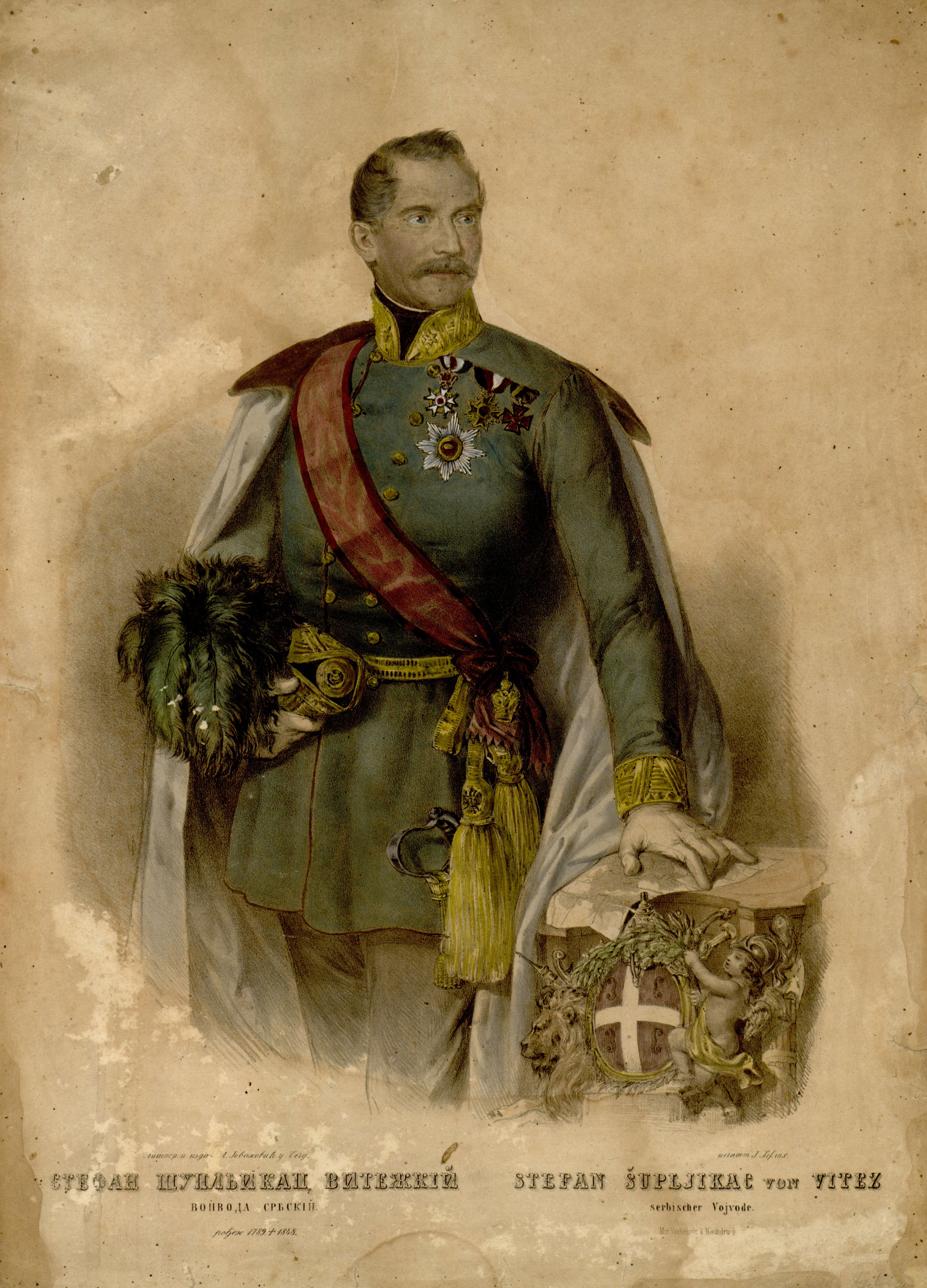
Portrait of voivode Stevan Šupljikac
