= Dimitrije Milaković =

Serbian philologist and historian

- Димитрије Милаковић
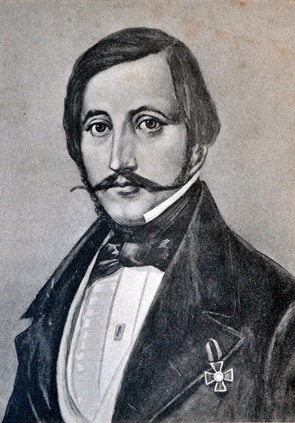
- Born: October 6, 1805; Jasenica, Ottoman Empire
- Died: August 27, 1858 (aged 52); Dresden, Kingdom of Saxony
- Resting place: Lipsko, Poland
- Education: University of Vienna
- Occupations: linguistics, philology, Slavic studies
- Known for: Secretary of the Prince-Bishop Petar II Petrović Njegoš, implementer of Njegoš's Serbian program of cultural and educational development
- Movement: Serbian Revival

Dimitrije Milaković (Serbian: Димитрије Милаковић; October 6, 1805 – August 27, 1858) was a Serbian philologist and historian.

He served as the personal secretary of Prince-Bishop Petar II Petrović-Njegoš from 1831 until the Prince-Bishop's death in 1851. He actively worked on the realization of Njegoš's program of cultural and educational development of the country and was the editor of the first Montenegrin magazine Grlica (1835–1839).

With regards to his literary-linguistic concept, Milaković can be described as moderate supporter of Vuk Karadžić's reforms. However, his insistence on more archaic orthography and morphological elements (archaic superlative and participle) largely pushed him into obscurity.

== Biography ==
Dimitrije Milaković was born in the village of Jasenica near Mostar on November 6, 1805. As a child, he moved to Mostar with his father, who died when Dimitrije was a small child.

Around the age of ten, he moved to Dubrovnik with his mother and older brother Jovan, fleeing a plague epidemic. Jovan became a merchant, while Dimitrije, being lame on one leg, studied the sciences. He finished elementary school in Dubrovnik, and high school in Novi Sad under Professor Georgije Magarašević. He graduated in philosophy in Pest and law in Vienna.

Milaković moved to Cetinje in 1831 and became Secretary of State in the Prince-Bishopric of Montenegro. Two years later, he traveled with Archimandrite Petar II Petrović-Njegoš to the Russian Empire, where he went to receive ordination. Milaković was also a personal friend of Njegoš, as well as accompanying him in various diplomatic activities, such as establishing the border between the Austrian Empire and Montenegro and establishing peace in Dubrovnik between the Prince-Bishop and Ali Pasha Rizvanbegović.

In 1836, he traveled again to the Russian Empire, where he stayed for about a year. After this, he became the personal secretary of Prince-Bishop Njegoš. During his stay in Russia, he received the Order of Saint Vladimir. He became a corresponding member of the newly founded Society of Serbian Letters in 1842.

After the death of Prince-Bishop Petar II, he traveled with Prince-Bishop Danilo to Saint Petersburg, where he became a secular Prince of Montenegro. On his return, Dimitrije spent some time in Trieste, where he sought information on Montenegrin history. After that, he spent two and a half years in Belgrade, from where he moved into his brother's home in Dubrovnik. He was in Dubrovnik for three years, where he was engaged in literary work.

After the Austrian police seized some of his papers as part of an investigation, Dimitrije decided to go to Saint Petersburg in February 1858. Now in poor health, he fell ill in Warsaw. After recovering somewhat, he moved to Dresden where he intended to continue his treatment and from there proceed to Paris where he'd stay for a short period of time. However, he died in Dresden on August 27, 1858. His brother ordered his corpse be transported from Dresden to Lipsko, where he was buried in the Orthodox cemetery.

== Philological and educational work ==
During his service in Cetinje, Milaković actively worked on the realization of Njegoš's program of cultural and educational development of the country.

He published and edited the first Montenegrin magazine Grlica (1835–1839), wrote the first school textbooks "Serbian Primer for Teaching Young People Ecclesiastical and Civic Reading" (1836) and "Serbian Grammar Compiled for the Montenegrin Youth. Part One" (1838). In 1849, Milaković reported to Vuk Karadžić that he had written the second part of his grammar, and had reworked the first significantly.

Unfortunately, the second part of Milaković's grammar was never published and the manuscript has been lost in the meantime.

Dimitrije Milaković's Serbian Grammar is the result of Njegoš's idea of "transforming the people", Milaković's studies of Russian philological thought, Vuk's grammatical and polemical writings, as well as older grammars, especially Mrazović's "Management". Milaković partly relies on the grammars of the Russian language of his time, such as that by Nikolay Gretsch and Alexander Vostokov, from which he at times transfers entire paragraphs without major changes. His second source and guide was Vuk's grammar published in 1818.

Milaković differs from Vuk significantly in terms of orthography, considering that both the "Serbian Primer" and the "Serbian Grammar" were published in old orthography. However, in the "Serbian Primer" he printed two alphabets, ecclesiastical and civil, which included some of Vuk's letters – Ћ, Ђ and Џ. In this regard, Milaković is in line with the idea of Prince-Bishop Njegoš, who wanted to avoid confrontations with the Serbian church. Milaković also differs from Vuk in terms of the literary and vernacular language, which he clearly keeps distinct, but unlike Vuk's opponents, he does not emphasize nor defend the role of Slavonic-Serbian heritage. Instead, Milaković emphasizes the vernacular as a foundation, while avoiding a total break with older literary-linguistic heritage. Milaković's morphological system is mostly in accordance with Vuk and is based on the morphological system of the Eastern Herzegovinian dialect. However, even here he differs from Vuk by introducing an archaic superlative and participle not present in the spoken language. Milaković behaved as a moderate follower of Vuk, and was largely forgotten because of his important deviations in relation to Vuk's orthography and morphological spelling.

He translated and reworked August Ludwig von Schlözer's "Introduction to World History" from Russian and collected material for the history of Montenegro. With this, he formed his work "History of Montenegro", which he published in Zadar in 1856. His history was certainly relied upon by the Russian historian Pavel Rovinsky in writing his work on Montenegrin history.

== Literature ==
- Milaković, Dimitrije. Istorija Crne Gore (PDF) (in Serbian). Pančevo: Braća Jovanović. Archived from the original (PDF) on 2 September 2020.
- Milićević, Milan Đ. (1888). Pomenik znamenitih ljudi u srpskog naroda novijeg doba (in Serbian). Belgrade: Srpska kraljevska štamparija. pp. 342–343.
- Okuka, Miloš (1989). "Dimitrije Milaković — umjereni vukovac" (PDF). Književni jezik (in Serbian). Filozofski fakultet Sarajevo: 207–213.
