= Petar II Petrović-Njegoš =

Vladika Petar II Petrović-Njegoš
- Петар II Петровић-Његош
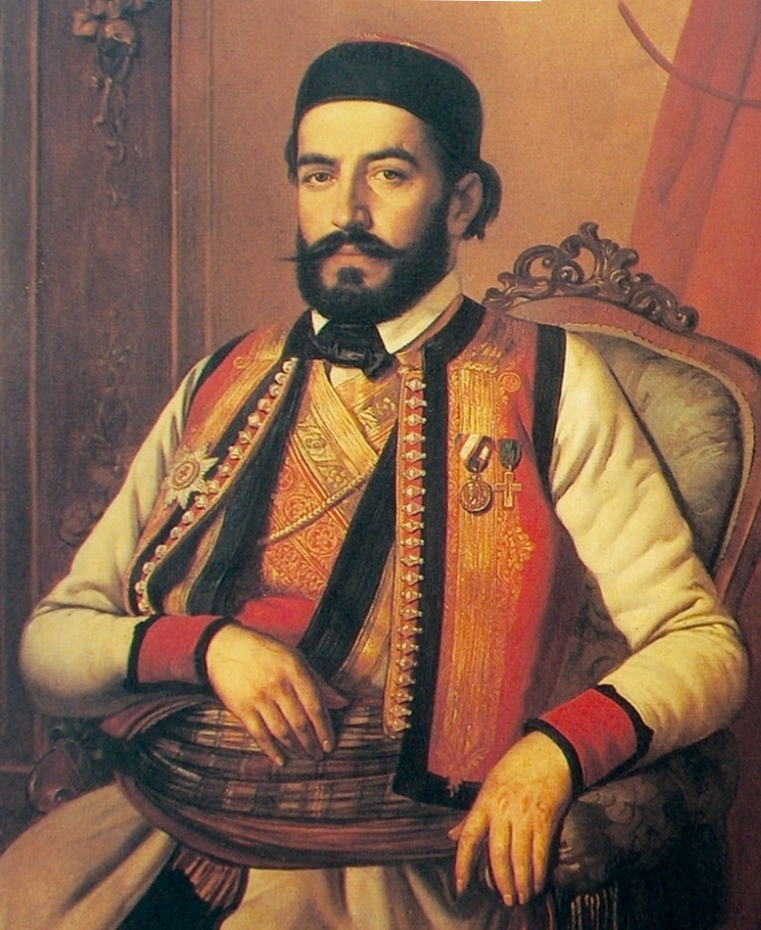
- Portrait by Johann Böss, 1847
- Born: Radivoje Petrović; 13 November [O.S. 1 November] 1813; Njeguši, Prince-Bishopric of Montenegro
- Died: 31 October [O.S. 19 October] 1851 (aged 37); Cetinje, Prince-Bishopric of Montenegro
- Resting place: Mausoleum of Njegoš, Mount Lovćen, Montenegro

Prince-Bishop of Montenegro
- Reign: 30 October 1830 – 31 October 1851
- Predecessor: Petar I Petrović-Njegoš
- Successor: Danilo II Petrović-Njegoš
- House: Petrović-Njegoš
- Father: Tomislav Petrović
- Mother: Ivana Proroković

Philosophical work
- Era: 19th century
- Region: Balkans
- School: Romanticism; Serb epic poetry
- Main interests: Drama; epic poetry; philosophical literature; religious literature
- Notable works: The Mountain Wreath; The Ray of the Microcosm

Petar II Petrović-Njegoš (Serbian Cyrillic: Петар II Петровић-Његош, pronounced [pětar drûɡi pětroʋitɕ ɲêɡoʃ]; 13 November [O.S. 1 November] 1813 – 31 October [O.S. 19 October] 1851) was a Serbian Prince-Bishop (vladika) of Montenegro, poet and philosopher whose works are widely considered some of the most important in Montenegrin and Serbian literature.

Njegoš was born in the village of Njeguši, near Montenegro's then-capital Cetinje. He was educated at several Serbian monasteries and became the country's spiritual and political leader following the death of his uncle Petar I. After eliminating all initial domestic opposition to his rule, he concentrated on uniting Montenegro's tribes and establishing a centralized state. He introduced regular taxation, formed a personal guard and implemented a series of new laws to replace those composed by his predecessor many years earlier. His taxation policies proved extremely unpopular with the tribes of Montenegro and were the cause of several revolts during his lifetime. Njegoš's reign was also defined by the constant political and military struggle with the Ottoman Empire, and by his attempts to expand Montenegro's territory while gaining unconditional recognition from the Sublime Porte. He was a proponent of uniting and liberating the Serb people, willing to concede his princely rights in exchange for a union with Serbia and his recognition as the religious leader of all Serbs (akin to a modern-day Patriarch of the Serbian Orthodox Church). Although unification between the two states did not occur during his lifetime, Njegoš laid some of the foundations of Yugoslavism and introduced modern political concepts to Montenegro. Venerated as a poet and philosopher, Njegoš is well known for his epic poem Gorski vijenac (The Mountain Wreath), which is considered a masterpiece of Serbian and other South Slavic literature, and the national epic of Serbia, Montenegro, and Yugoslavia. Njegoš has remained influential in Serbia and Montenegro, as well in neighboring countries.

== Early life and origins ==
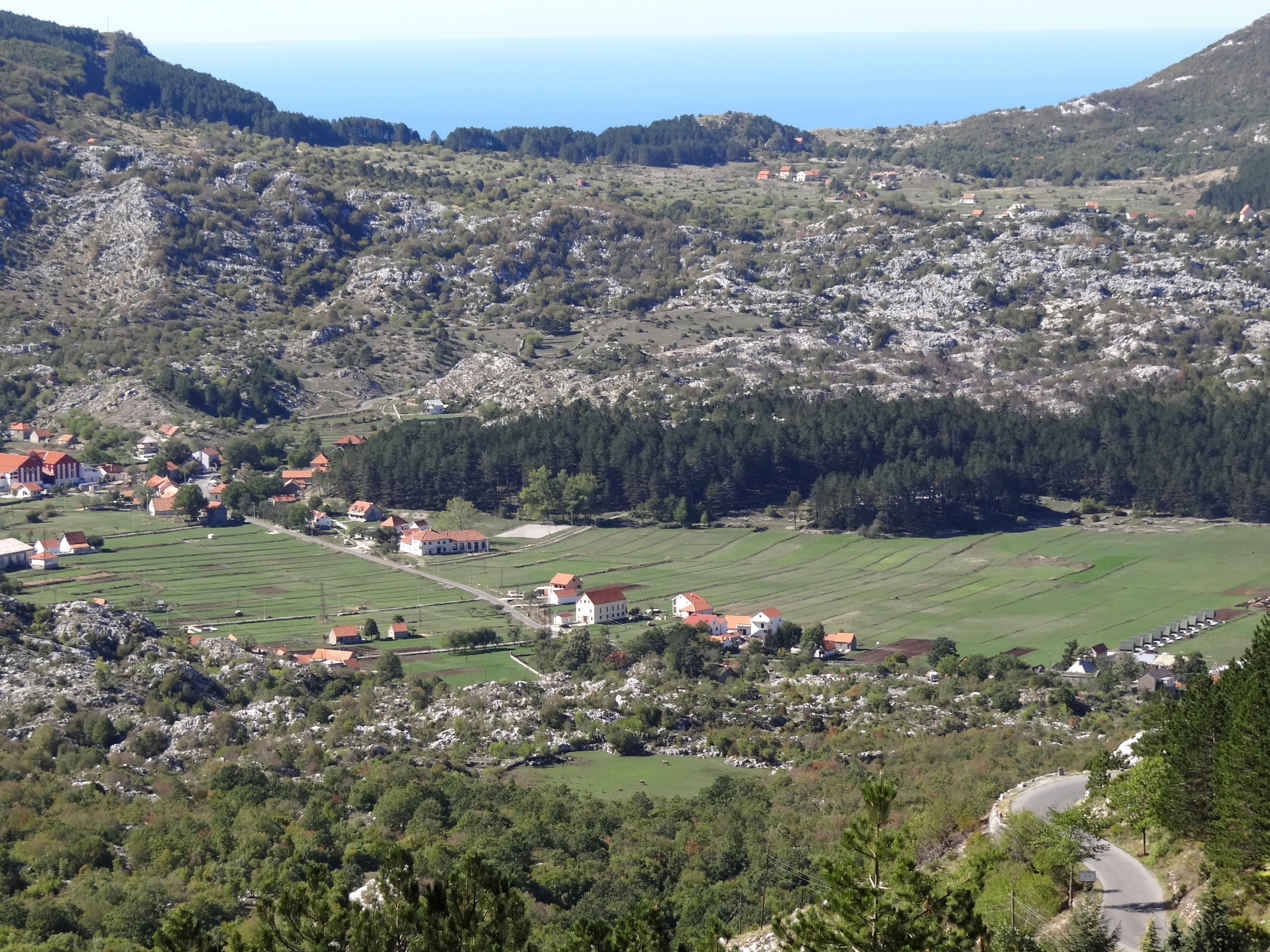
The village of Njeguši, near Cetinje; birthplace of Petar II Petrović-Njegoš, Prince-Bishop of Montenegro

Petar II Petrović-Njegoš was born Radivoje "Rade" Petrović on 13 November [O.S. 1 November] 1813 in the mountain village of Njeguši, near Cetinje. (Note: Some scholars contend that he was born in 1811 or 1814, but the general scholarly consensus indicates a birth year of 1813.) His father, Tomislav "Tomo" Petrović (b. 1762–63), was a member of the Petrović clan of the Njeguši tribe of Katuni nahiya. Njegoš's mother, Ivana Proroković, hailed from the hamlet of Mali Zalaz and was the daughter of Njeguši captain Lazo Proroković. There is no reliable information about her exact year of birth, but it is believed that she was about ten years younger than her husband. Tomo and Ivana had five children; their eldest son was Petar ("Pero"), Rade was their middle son and Jovan ("Joko") was their youngest. The couple's daughters were named Marija and Stana; Marija was married to a Montenegrin chieftain named Andrija Perović, the serdar (count) of Cuce, while Stana was married to Filip Đurašković, the serdar of Rijeka Crnojevića.

Njeguši is a remote village, situated near the Adriatic coast in western Montenegro (or Old Montenegro). The eponymous tribe is one of the oldest in Montenegro, and its history can be traced back to the 14th century. It likely came about as the result of intermarriages between Illyrian population and South Slavic settlers during the 10th century, according to the author Milovan Djilas. (Note: Nineteenth-century Czech historian Konstantin Josef Jireček believed that Njeguši was an appellation derived from the given name Njeguš (whose root means to tend or cultivate). The Njeguši had most likely called themselves Njegoši at an earlier time, but popular speech transformed the "o" into a "u" over the centuries. Jiriček notes that the surname Njegoš (spelled Niegusz) can also be found in Poland; records show that it was used by Herzegovinian Serbs as late as the 1740s. Croatian linguist Petar Šimunović derived N(j)egoš from the Romanian negos, meaning "papillate".) Njeguši was dominated by the Petrovićes' ancestral home, which was the only two-storied house in the village and was made entirely out of stone. (Note: Zlatar notes that this is indicative of the importance of the Petrovićes within the tribe.) Members of Njeguši's Petrović clan had been hereditary Serbian Orthodox Metropolitans (Prince-Bishops) of Cetinje since 1696; the title of Prince-Bishop (Serbian: vladika) was passed from uncle to nephew since Orthodox prelates were required to be celibate and could not have children of their own. The ruling Prince-Bishop was allowed to nominate his own successor, subject to approval by the Montenegrin chieftains and the people of Montenegro.

Njegoš spent his early years in Njeguši shepherding his father's flock, playing the gusle (a traditional one-stringed instrument) and attending family and church celebrations where stories of battles and past suffering were told. His education was rudimentary; he was taught how to read and write by monks at the Cetinje Monastery when he was twelve years old, studied Italian at the Savina Monastery for a year and spent eighteen months at the Topla Monastery near Herceg Novi, learning Russian and French under the tuition of reverend Josif Tropović. In October 1827, the young Njegoš was taken under the tutelage of the poet and playwright Sima Milutinović (nicknamed "Sarajlija"), who had come to Montenegro to serve as the official secretary of Njegoš's uncle, vladika Petar I. A Sarajevan Serb, Milutinović introduced Njegoš to poetry and inspired him to write down Serb folk tales which had been passed down orally through the centuries. An unconventional mentor, he also taught Njegoš sports, shooting and sword-fighting.

== Reign ==
=== Historical background ===
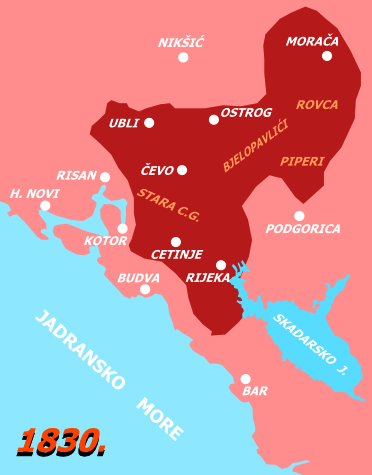
Montenegro in 1830

Nineteenth-century Montenegrin society was quite primitive even by contemporary standards. Foreigners were viewed with suspicion and merchants were widely seen as "money-grubbing" and "effete". Wars between the Montenegrins and neighboring Muslim tribes were all too common, as was cattle rustling, banditry and headhunting. Men devoted much of their energy to incessant blood feuds, limiting the effectiveness of Montenegrin resistance to the Turks. (Note: According to Montenegrin custom, if a member of one clan killed a member of another clan, the life of one of the murderer's fellow clansmen had to be taken. Since this act of vengeance, in turn, called for revenge, the custom inspired a never-ending cycle of bloodshed.) Most physical labors was done by women; entertainment consisted of contests exhibiting feats of strength and evenings spent listening to songs recounting heroic exploits to the accompaniment of the gusle.

Before the 19th century, western Montenegro was nothing more than a cluster of feuding tribes presided over by the Metropolitans of Cetinje. Montenegrin territory consisted of four small districts (Turkish: nahiye), the most important of which was the Katuni nahiya with its nine tribes (Cetinje, Njeguši, Ćeklići, Bjelice, Cuce, Čevo, Pješivci, Zagarač, and Komani). These areas had been de facto independent from the Ottoman Empire since the Treaty of Passarowitz in 1718, though elements of self-governance had existed since the earliest days of Turkish rule in the 15th century. For decades, Ottoman authorities treated the inhabitants of western Montenegro and eastern Herzegovina as unsubjected filuricis who were only obligated to pay a fixed amount of Florentine ducats (florin) to the Ottomans each year. Such taxation did not increase with the wealth or size of one's household, and Serbs in these regions were completely exempt from the Ottoman poll tax and other levies usually paid by Christian subjects to the Sublime Porte. Though the privileges granted the highlanders were meant to allay public dissatisfaction in these poor but strategically vital regions on the Venetian border, by the late 16th century, they ended up having the opposite effect. The Serbs began shunning Ottoman tax collectors entirely, and when the Ottomans attempted to impose some of the taxes normally paid by other Christian subjects, the Serbs revolted and carved out their own autonomous region. Absence of Ottoman authority produced an ideal opportunity for tribalism to flourish. Thousands of Serbs who remained in Ottoman-held territory converted to Islam to avoid paying these newly imposed taxes. Converts were granted full rights and privileges as Muslim subjects of the Sultan, while non-Muslims were viewed as second-class subjects and treated as such. Hence, Christians viewed all converts with derision and considered them "traitors to the faith of their forefathers". Religious killings were common in times of war since both Christians and Muslims considered members of the opposing faith to be apostates worthy of death.

Although Montenegrin warriors often attributed their country's survival as an independent entity to their own military prowess, journalist Tim Judah notes that the Turks often saw little point in expending blood and resources trying to subdue the impoverished sliver of land controlled by the Montenegrin chieftains. As far as the Ottomans were concerned, the Montenegrins were "rebellious infidels" who only wished to plunder what property their more prosperous Muslim neighbors possessed. Throughout the 18th century, thousands of Montenegrins left their homeland and migrated to Serbia in the hope of finding fertile fields to raise their crops. Authority became more centralized after Petar I came to power in 1782. In 1796, Petar initiated a war against Kara Mahmud Bushati, vizier of the Pashalik of Scutari, which reinforced Montenegro's autonomy and resulted in large territorial gains at the Ottomans' expense. Two years later, a council of tribal chiefs met in Cetinje and agreed to compose a code of laws and form a central court known as a kuluk, which had both administrative and judicial functions. Despite these accomplishments, Petar had little success in unifying the disparate Montenegrin tribes, as it was impossible to form a stable government or organize an army unless taxes could be levied, and the tribes were no more willing to pay taxes to Cetinje than they were to the Ottomans. Attempts to stop their raiding and looting were equally futile, as attempted to keep them from feuding with one another. By 1830, Montenegro boasted only a handful of literate citizens, yet it was seen in the Western world as a bastion of Christian resistance to the Turks. The country's economic situation remained dire, its borders were still not internationally recognized and the Turks continued to claim it as part of their empire.

=== Accession ===
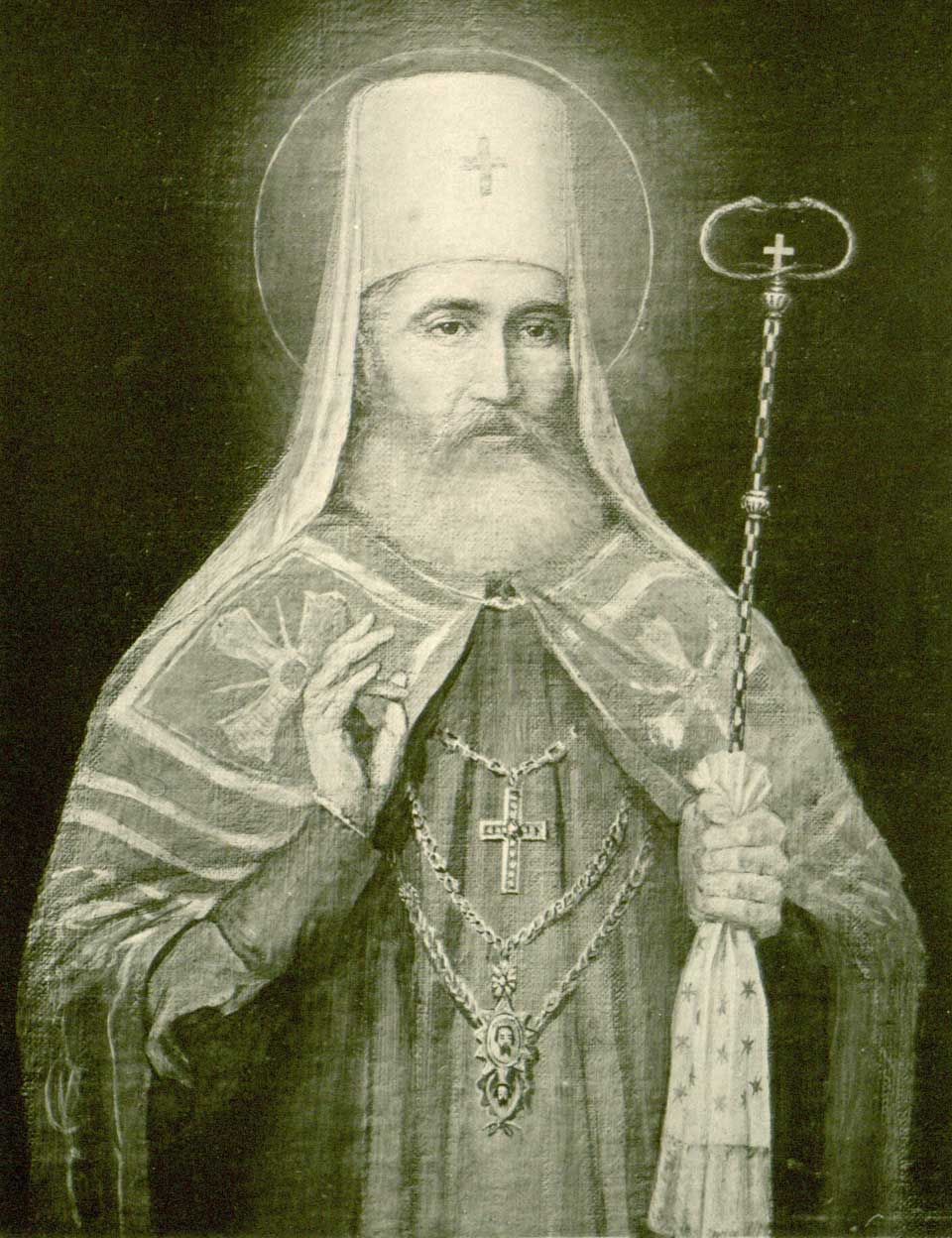
Njegoš succeeded his uncle, Petar I, as ruler.

Petar I's final years were defined by his deteriorating health and continuing inability to find a successor—ideally both a Petrović and a literate monk—capable of carrying on his role. Petar's first candidate was Mitar M. Petrović, the son of his eldest brother Stjepan. Within several years, the younger Petrović died and Petar was forced to find a different successor. He turned his attention to Đorđije S. Petrović, his middle brother's son. As Đorđije was illiterate, Petar sent him to Saint Petersburg to attend school. Once there, Đorđije realized that he preferred living in Russia over Montenegro. In 1828, he sent his uncle a letter from Saint Petersburg informing him that he wished to enroll into the Imperial Russian Army and asking to be relieved of succession. In 1829, Petar informed Jeremija Gagić, an ethnic Serb who served as the Russian vice-consul in Dubrovnik and was in charge of all of Russia's dealings with Montenegro, that Đorđije had his permission to enter the Russian military, depriving him of his right to the throne.

It was only then that Petar entertained the possibility of extending his throne to the teenaged Njegoš and took steps to further his education. The seventeen-year-old was again sent to the Cetinje Monastery and mentored at its seminary. Petar then introduced him to state matters, trusting him with the writing of official letters and orders on his behalf. He died of old age on 30 October [O.S. 18 October] 1830, without having publicly named a successor. Prior to his death, the elderly vladika had dictated his will and testament to Njegoš's old mentor, Milutinović, where he named Njegoš as his successor and granted all of his ecclesiastical and secular powers to him. The will also cursed anyone who trampled over Montenegro's traditional bonds with Russia in exchange for better relations with Austria, swearing that leprosy would strike them down. Some Montenegrins hostile to the Petrović clan alleged that Milutinović had fabricated the document in order to make Njegoš vladika, pointing to their close friendship as proof. Several scholars have raised the possibility that the will was indeed a forgery, though most modern historians believe that it was genuine.

The day after Petar's death, all of Montenegro's chieftains met in Cetinje to confirm the new vladika. According to one account, there were several chieftains who did not wish to see Njegoš bestowed the title. They considered him too young and inexperienced, and disliked the haste with which he was to be crowned. Figures such as Milutinović, Stanko S. Petrović, iguman Mojsije Zečević, serdar Mikhail Bošković, and the headman of Čevo, Stefan Vukotić, supported Njegoš's bid and urged the council to immediately proclaim him the next vladika. The first to recognize him as such was the archimandrite of Ostrog, Josif Pavičević, followed by the guvernadur (governor) of Montenegro, Vukolaj "Vuko" Radonjić, and all the other chieftains. Another account holds that Radonjić hotly opposed Njegoš's succession and argued that the expatriated Đorđije was Petar I's true heir. The reason behind Radonjić's opposition to Njegoš lay in the fact that his clan, the Radonjićes, were bitter enemies of Njegoš's Petrović clan. Apparently, Radonjić's opinion did not sway the chieftains and they composed a declaration proclaiming Njegoš the next vladika. According to this account, archimandrite Josif signed the declaration first and Radonjić signed it last after seeing that all of the other chieftains had done so. Despite not having any formal training as a monk, the teenaged Njegoš was consecrated in 1831 an archimandrite himself in a ceremony that took place in the Kom Monastery. He adopted the ecclesiastical name Petar in honour of his late predecessor, thus becoming known as Petar II Petrović-Njegoš. Following his consecration, he signed himself using his monastic name and his surname. Thus, all of Njegoš's correspondences were signed under the name Petar Petrović, though the Montenegrin people continued to refer to him by his given name and affectionately called him Bishop Rade. In most scholarly texts, he is referred to simply as Njegoš.

=== Crushing dissent (1830–32) ===
==== Whispers of conspiracy ====
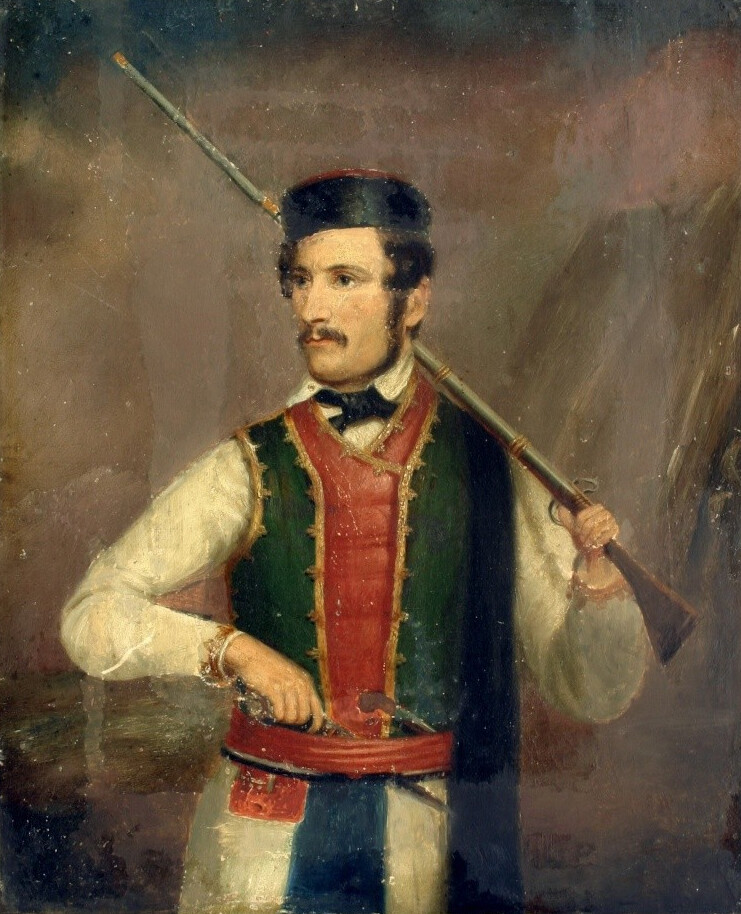
Vukolaj "Vuko" Radonjić, the head of the Radonjić family, was Njegoš's main opponent during his first months in power.

The Radonjić family traditionally opposed Montenegro's close ties with Russia, advocating a closer relationship with Austria instead. This pro-Austrian orientation dated to the fall of the Venetian Republic in 1797, when Austria annexed all of Venice's possessions and established a land border with Montenegro. The Radonjićes then became the leading pro-Austrian clan and frequently made contact with Austrian agents in the Bay of Kotor, on the Montenegrin frontier. Vuko Radonjić's conflict with Njegoš took on both a personal and a political dimension, not only because their clans were traditional rivals but because the Petrovićes were ardently pro-Russian, largely due to ecclesiastical ties between the vladika and the Russian Most Holy Synod. As guvernadur, Radonjić occupied a position that was meant exclusively for the Radonjićes, just as the post of vladika could only be held by a Petrović. The office of guvernadur dated back to 1715, when the Venetian Senate created the title of supreme vojvoda (duke) to share power with the vladika of Montenegro. The Venetians titled it governattore, which became guvernadur in Montenegrin dialect. Although the jurisdiction of a guvernadur had never been clearly defined, the Radonjićes and their supporters regularly claimed that his powers were equal to that of the vladika while the Petrovićes and their supporters argued that the vladika always had the final say in Montenegrin affairs. Now, with Njegoš poised to take the throne, Radonjić began claiming the superiority of his office and attempted to attain full control over secular affairs.

In late November 1830, Radonjić wrote to vice-consul Gagić in Dubrovnik complaining about Cetinje's inability to hold the tribes together and the anarchy that was sweeping through the countryside. This apparently led him to conspire with the Austrians to have Njegoš removed from his throne and have him replaced by his cousin, Đorđije. On orders from Franjo Tomašić, the governor of the Kingdom of Dalmatia, the commander of Fort Dubrovnik met Radonjić at Kotor on 27–28 November [O.S. 16–17 November] 1830. Radonjić left Montenegro without informing Njegoš or the other chieftains, raising much suspicion. His meeting with the Austrian commander did not remain a secret for very long. On 28 November, a group of Montenegrins who happened to be visiting Kotor noticed Radonjić in the company of a few Austrian officers. They stormed the house where the meeting was taking place, exchanged obscenities with Radonjić and hurried back to Cetinje to report on what they had seen; Njegoš was furious. In a letter to Gagić dated 4 December [O.S. 23 November], he wrote: "Radonjić [went] to the Kotor hinterland ... without anybody's notice, but on his own ... and there met some imperial general and other imperial men, having in mind to give up Montenegro and place it under their protection thinking that after the late vladika's death there were no sons of Montenegro allied to glorious Russia."

==== Elimination of the Radonjićes ====
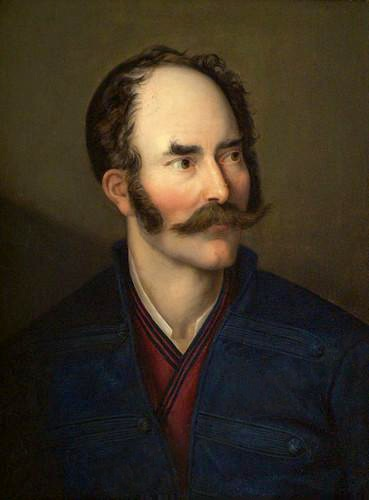
Njegoš forced his mentor Sima Milutinović into exile in 1831, but the two were later reconciled.

As soon as they heard the news of Radonjić's dealings in Kotor, the chieftains called for an urgent council to decide what was to be done with him. Radonjić faced the chieftains on 29 November [O.S. 18 November]. He was divested of power, stripped of all his titles, and his gubernatorial seal (a symbol of his office) was taken away from him. At noon, the council decided that he was guilty of treason and condemned him to death by firing squad alongside his brother Marko, a co-conspirator. (Note: This method of execution involved the use of muskets, and was thus referred to as "musketing". Three crimes were punishable by death—murder, treason and insulting the vladika. Executions of Montenegrin citizens had to be carried by a five-member firing squad, shooting simultaneously, so that responsibility for the convict's death could not be assigned to any one individual or his family, making it impossible for a blood feud to erupt.) Radonjić had failed to win over the chieftains; historian Barbara Jelavich asserts that the vast majority of chiefs backed the Petrovićes solely because they saw an ecclesiastical leader like Njegoš as posing less of a threat to their own power. The chieftains later wrote a report to Gagić explaining that Radonjić and his brother would be shot because "[they] dared to make secret arrangements with the imperialists to surrender the independence of Montenegro to Austria." The other Radonjićes were to be forced into exile. Several weeks later, Njegoš commuted Radonjić's sentence in a well-timed display of clemency, first to life imprisonment and then to exile. Radonjić's youngest brother, Djuzo, was not as fortunate; he was ambushed by a close friend on the day of his family's slava (patron saint day) and killed. Many of the other Radonjićes also met violent ends, either being killed in raids or driven out with their families after their villages were torched. By 1831, Milutinović (now Njegoš's personal secretary) was also forced into exile after entering into a disagreement with the young vladika. In the weeks before he forced him into exile, Njegoš had become very critical of his old mentor and frequently pointed out his shortcomings before others. Milutinović was given permission to return shortly afterwards on the understanding that their relationship would be on the young man's terms. Djilas suggests that this episode occurred because Milutinović had "taken liberties" trying to influence Njegoš's decisions during his early days on the throne.

Radonjić, who was exiled to the coast, continued to have treasonous correspondence with the Austrians in Kotor. When some of his letters to the Austrian officials were discovered, he was apprehended by Njegoš's warriors, taken back to Cetinje and put on trial for treason alongside his brother Marko on 16 January [O.S. 4 January] 1832. The two were accused of inciting Serbs to flee from Montenegro and settle in neighbouring Austrian lands, and of conspiring to overthrow Njegoš so that the Radonjićes could surrender Montenegro to the Habsburgs, making it an Austrian protectorate. They were found guilty of treason once again, but this time they were immediately driven into exile. Radonjić died of natural causes on 30 May [O.S. 18 May] 1832, shortly after being forced from Cetinje.

=== Establishment of the Governing Senate ===
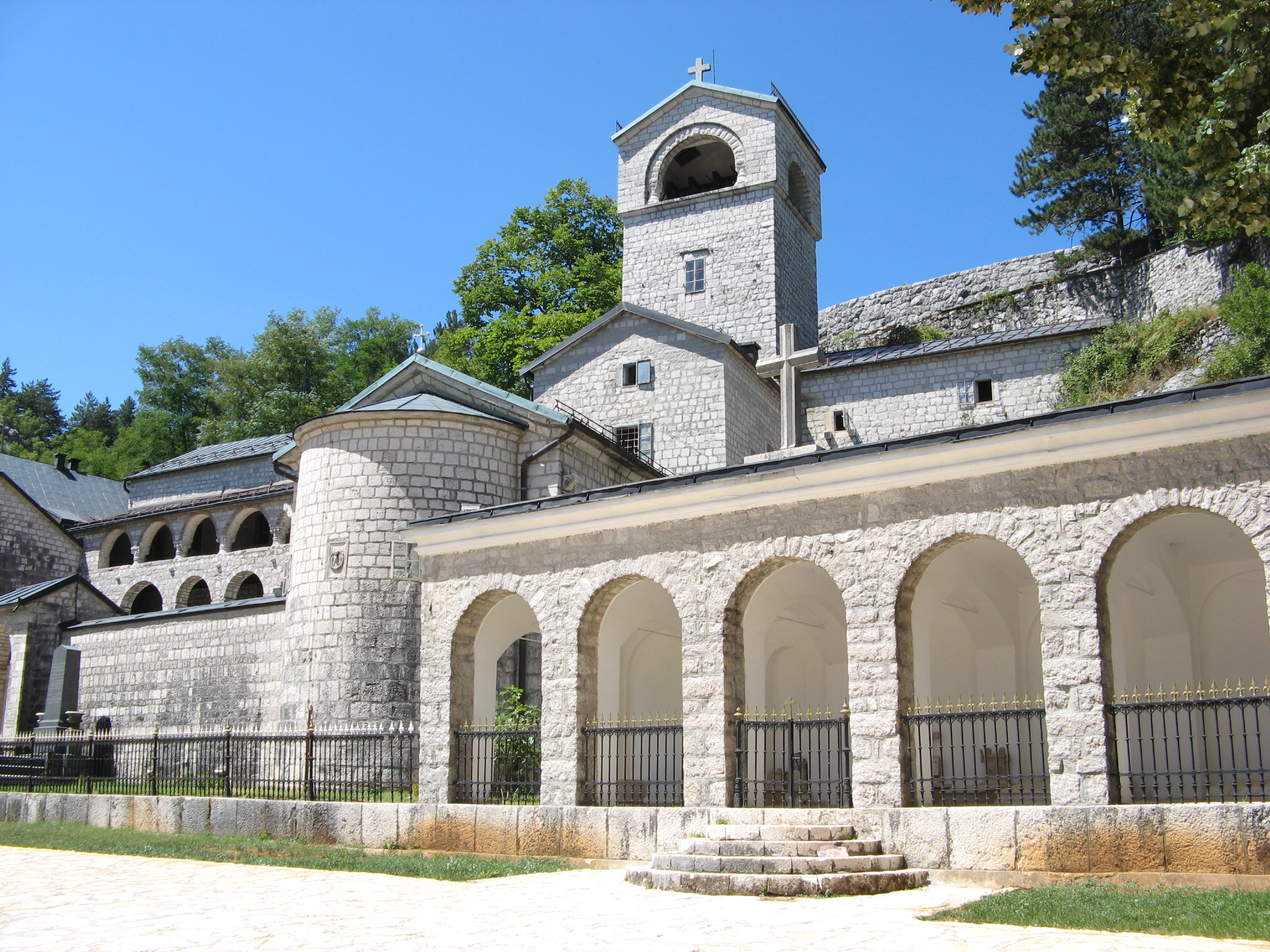
The Cetinje Monastery

The beginning of Njegoš' reign was marked by a revival of Montenegro's traditional alliance with Russia. The relationship between the two countries was motivated by the Montenegrins' need to have a powerful ally who could provide political and financial support to their fledgling nation and Russia's desire to exploit Montenegro's strategic location in its ongoing geopolitical battle with Austria. Traditionally, the Serbian Orthodox monastery in Cetinje and the institution of vladika had survived through the centuries because of Russian support, but Petar I's final years witnessed a cooling of Russo–Montenegrin relations. With the Radonjićes expelled, Njegoš abolished the office of guvernadur in 1832. This move did not bring him any new powers, as Russia insisted on the establishment of the Governing Senate (Praviteljstvujuščiji senat) of Montenegro and the Highlands, whose purpose was to limit and regulate the powers of the vladika. Much like the Governing Soviet (Praviteljstvujušči sovjet) in Serbia, most of the senate's members were hand-picked by the Russians because of their political leanings, which were often more favourable to Saint Petersburg than they were to Vienna. Created to replace the kuluk formed by Petar I in 1798, the senate was established by Ivan Vukotić, a Montenegrin-born diplomat in Russian service. He had been sent to Cetinje by the Russian government in 1831, alongside his nephew Matija Vučićević. The two hailed from the Turkish-controlled Zeta Plain and had lived in Russia for much of their lives. They were tasked with establishing a strong central government which could control the country's many tribes. Vukotić was quite wealthy, having inherited a large sum of money from a noble family member, and had experience as a non-commissioned officer in the Russian military.

Aside from having to deal with Russian political interference, Njegoš faced several other limitations to his power. He had no army, militia or police force to enforce the rule of law within the territory he nominally controlled and had to rely on warriors from his own clan for protection. The tribes on the Montenegrin frontier often either refused to obey him or befriended his enemies. Tribal raids, which drove deep into Ottoman-held Herzegovina, occurred frequently and looting proved key to the region's economic survival. Though such raids normally elicited a harsh response from the Ottomans, Njegoš was powerless to stop them.

The creation of the Governing Senate introduced some semblance of order into Montenegrin politics. Vukotić was proclaimed the senate's president and Vučićević became its vice-president. The Montenegrins referred to them as "their Russian lordships". In total, the senate was made up of twelve men who received an annual salary of 40 talirs each. It had legislative, judiciary and executed powers, and was the first state institution in Montenegro's modern history. The possibility of any significant opposition to the senate's creation was extinguished by the appointment of important chieftains and other prominent citizens as senators. Njegoš himself was not a member of the senate, which was completely dominated by Vukotić and Vučićević during the first few years of its existence. The senate's decisions were to be enforced by a military-police organization known as the Gvardija (The Guard). It had regional representatives throughout the tribal territories and its headquarters were situated in Rijeka Crnojevića. All its senior commanders were called captains, and were selected as the most prominent men in their clans. The Gvardija initially had a strength of about 150 warriors, but this number later rose to 420. Russian subsidies ensured that all of its members received their salaries without delay. Central authority was further strengthened by increasing the size of the vladika's personal guard, the Perjanici (or "plumed ones", so called because of the feathers that members wore on their guardsmen's caps).

=== Battle of Podgorica and early attempts at taxation ===
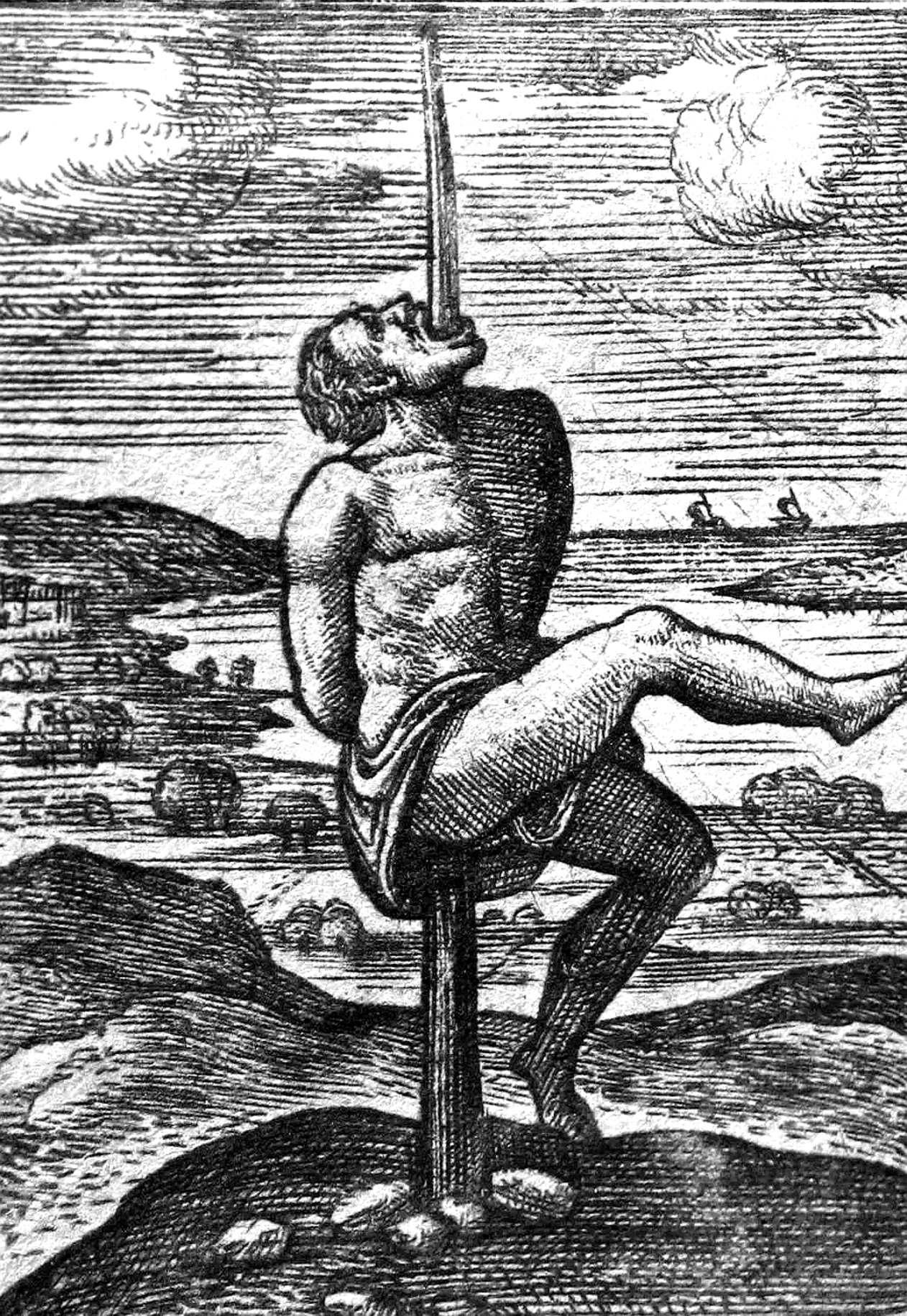
Reşid Mehmed Pasha impaled numerous Montenegrins following the attack on Podgorica (example illustration pictured)

In 1832, the nineteen-year-old Njegoš launched an attack against the Muslim tribes of Podgorica, who were helping the Ottomans subdue rebellions in Bosnia and neighbouring Albania. As in earlier times, when the vladika and guvernadur jointly led Montenegrin warriors into battle, Njegoš was joined by Vukotić and his men. The Montenegrins were also assisted by the rebellious Hoti clan of northern Albania. Njegoš and his forces were still at a disadvantage, as they lacked a concrete strategy for how to deal with the Ottomans and were not expecting them to bring cavalry onto the field. The Montenegrins' guerilla-like approach to warfare was ill-suited to taking a city such as Podgorica, whose high stone walls made it impenetrable from the surrounding flatlands. By launching the attack, Njegoš also risked falling out with the Russians, who at that time were allied with the Turks. Badly outmaneuvered, the Montenegrins were defeated and forced to retreat, taking with them many wounded. For Njegoš, the defeat would remain a lasting source of regret. Grand Vizier Reşid Mehmed Pasha seized on the opportunity and attacked a string of Montenegrin towns and villages in response to the attack, impaling and hanging all the Montenegrins that he captured. Subsequent political pressure from Russia discouraged Njegoš from seeking revenge.

In response to the defeat at Podgorica, the Montenegrins formed tactical alliances with neighbouring Muslims tribes that were hostile to the Porte. By entering into such alliances Njegoš risked further alienating the Russians, whose support Montenegro still desperately needed. To neutralize any suspicion that Montenegro was acting against Russian interests, Njegoš cultivated a close personal friendship with vice-consul Grujić, who advised the czar that Njegoš was as dependable as ever. In one of his letters to Grujić, Njegoš reported that the final advice Petar I gave him before his death was "pray to God and hold on to Russia".

In 1833, Vukotić introduced regular taxation to Montenegro. As Vukotić, Grujić and Njegoš all realized, without taxes the country had no chance of functioning as a centralized state, let alone one which could raise an independent army or survive without needing to rely on plunder or Russian charity. Even though the rates were low, the tribes fiercely resisted the new laws, which never managed to generate more revenue than funds received through Russian subsidies. Many chieftains refused to levy taxes against their tribes, and some even mockingly called on Njegoš to come and collect them himself.

=== Journey to Saint Petersburg and consecration ===
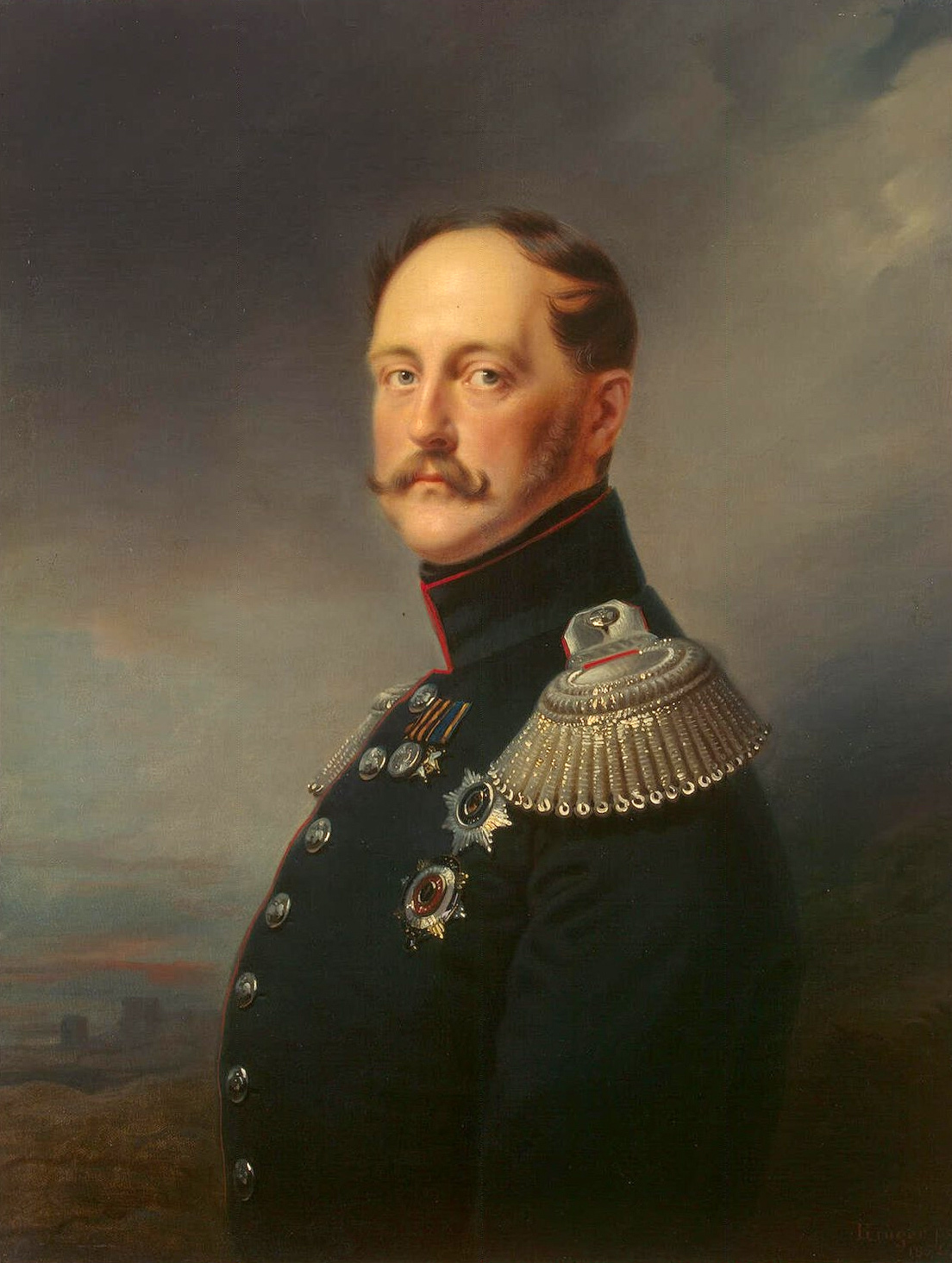
After Njegoš's consecration, Russian Emperor Nicholas I granted Montenegro considerable financial aid and promised that Russia would come to the country's defense if it was attacked.

Njegoš left Cetinje in early 1833 and set out on the long journey to Saint Petersburg. He hoped to be granted a meeting with Russian Emperor (czar) Nicholas I and consecrated as Metropolitan of Cetinje by the Holy Synod. Such a move was considered highly unusual at the time, as a vladika was traditionally consecrated by the Patriarch of Peć either in Patriarchal Monastery of Peć or in Sremski Karlovci, not Saint Petersburg. According to church canon, a vladika could not be any younger than thirty, a prerequisite that the twenty-year-old Njegoš clearly failed to meet. As such, he chose to have his consecration occur in Saint Petersburg out of political necessity, as he desperately needed the czar to bend church canons in his favour in order to acquire total legitimacy at home and brush aside any theological objections. On his way to Saint Petersburg, Njegoš made stops in several Austrian cities. In Vienna, he met famed Serbian language reformer Vuk Stefanović Karadžić. Karadžić was greatly impressed with Njegoš, and in a letter to poet Lukijan Mušicki, he wrote: "Petar Petrović is not yet twenty years old, but is taller and more handsome than any grenadier in Vienna. Not only does he know Serbian very well to read and write, but he also composes fine verse. He thinks that there is no finer language in the world than our popular tongue (and he's right to think so, even if it were not true)." Njegoš arrived in Saint Petersburg in March 1833 and was consecrated. After the ceremony, the czar granted Njegoš a total of 36,000 rubles, 15,000 of which were to make up for his travel expenses. Standing next to Njegoš as he gave his speech, the czar is said to have commented: "My word, you're bigger than I am." Grateful, the young vladika replied: "Only God is bigger than the Russian czar!" The czar promised Njegoš that Russia would intervene on Montenegro's behalf as if it were one of its own gubernias, while the Holy Synod vowed to provide all the necessary equipment and funds needed to maintain regular religious services in the country.

Njegoš returned to Montenegro with the money that the czar had given him, as well as a number of theological books and icons for the Cetinje Monastery. Shortly afterwards, he established the first two elementary schools in Montenegro, one in Cetinje and the other in Dobrsko Selo, (Note: It is said that a student need only have brought a severed Turkish head to their teacher to be excused from missing class.) and sent sixteen young Montenegrins to pursue higher education in Serbia, seven of whom returned to Montenegro after finishing school. They were among the few literate people in the country. Njegoš also brought home a modern printing press, the first in Montenegro since the time of the Crnojević dynasty more than 300 years earlier. It was transported from Saint Petersburg in its entirety and had to be carried through the precarious mountain passes of Montenegro to the Cetinje Monastery, where it was finally set up. Although nearly all Montenegrins were illiterate, Njegoš persisted in establishing a periodical which he named Grlica (The Turtledove) and used the press to print some of his own poems, as well as works by Milutinović and Karadžić. Grlica did not last long, and fell out of circulation in 1839. The printing press survived until 1852, when its type was melted down to make bullets to fight the Turks.

=== Canonization of Petar I, taxpayer revolt and the Battle of Grahovo ===
While Njegoš was in Vienna and Russia in 1833, Vukotić took advantage of the vladika's prolonged absence to increase his own power. Njegoš quickly moved to push Vukotić aside, installing his own brother Pero as senate leader and their cousin Đorđije—who had recently returned from Saint Petersburg—as Pero's deputy. Vukotić and Vučićević were exiled to Russia. There, they spread countless rumours about Njegoš in an attempt to tarnish his reputation. While their actions threatened to ruin his image abroad, Njegoš was far more concerned about domestic discontent with his tax policies. He reasoned that his pious and overly superstitious citizens would not protest taxation as fiercely if the Petrovićes boasted a saint who was of the same bloodline. Hence, he arranged for the canonization of the late Petar I on the fourth anniversary of his death, in October 1834. With a saint in his family, Njegoš could now threaten any Montenegrin who challenged his authority with spiritual sanctions. Most Montenegrins were greatly enthusiastic about Petar's canonization, and many flocked to his tomb in Cetinje to celebrate the event. While Njegoš was now in a more stable position than he was two years earlier, he still encountered several challenges to his rule. He was criticized for allegedly misappropriating the funds given to him by the Russians, and a tribal rebellion in Crmnica and Riječka nahiya erupted in response to the demands of tax collectors and chronic food shortages. The revolt was crushed by Njegoš's cousins Đorđije and Stanko, but the allegations of fund misappropriation further tarnished his reputation among the Russians.

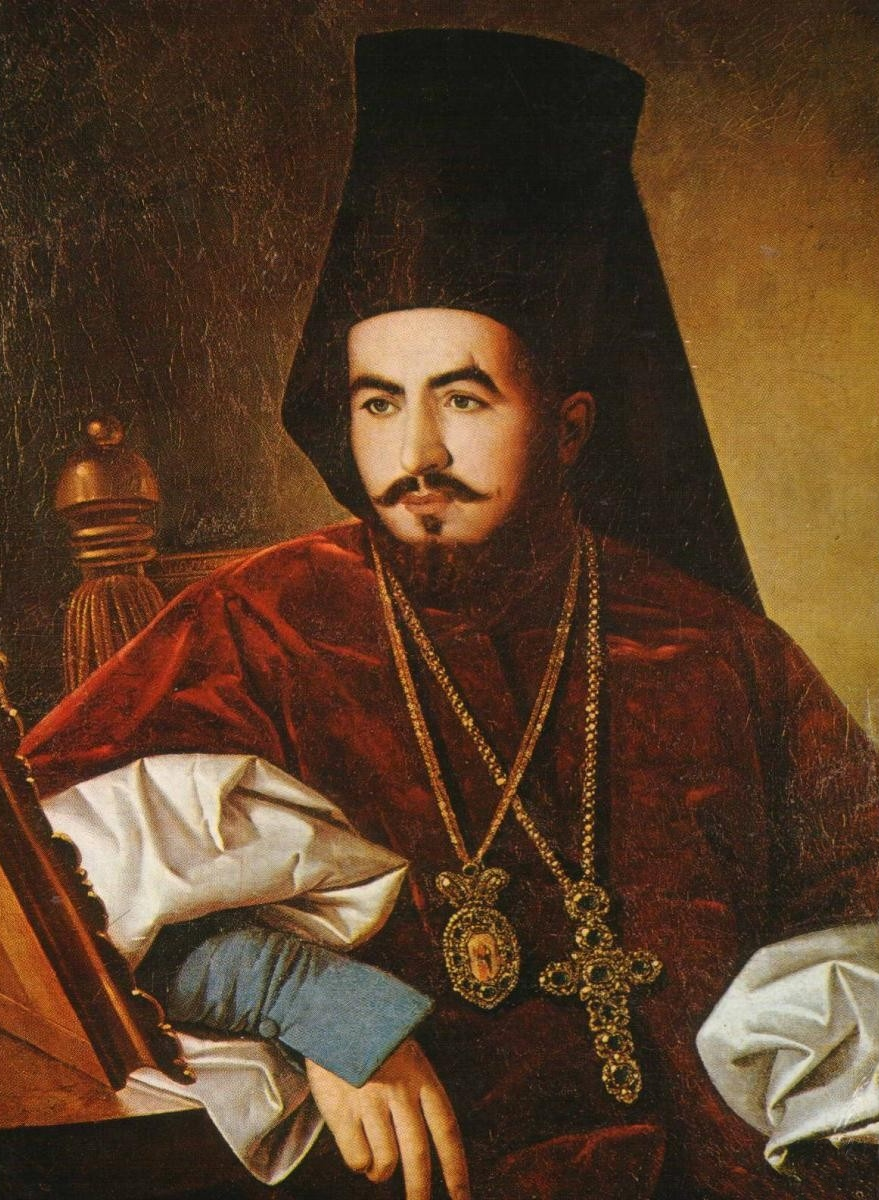
Oil painting of Njegoš as vladika, c. 1837

In early August 1836, the vizier of the Herzegovina Eyalet, Ali Pasha Rıdvanoğlu, attacked Grahovo, a town on Montenegro's northern frontier that had long been claimed by the Montenegrins. Its Christian inhabitants, still Ali Pasha's feudatories, had refused to pay the haraç, an Ottoman poll tax on non-Muslims. Ali Pasha's forces overran the town, burned it to the ground and took countless Christians hostage; the rebels appealed to Njegoš for help. As honour demanded, Njegoš sent a force led by his teenage brother Joko and his nephew Stevan to rescue the hostages while Ali Pasha was in Gacko waiting for reinforcements to address the Montenegrin advance. The Montenegrins had assembled a force of several hundred warriors led by Joko, Stevan and eight Petrović chiefs. They were initially successful in rescuing one of the imprisoned clan leaders and his followers, but were overwhelmed by the combined forces of Ali Pasha, Trebinje's Osman Pasha-beg and the cavalry reinforcements of Smaïl-aga Čengić in what became known as the Battle of Grahovo. Turks made use of a feigned retreat to lure the Montenegrins into a trap, surrounded them and used reinforcements to cut off their lines of retreat. More than forty of the Montenegrin warriors were hacked to death in the ensuing chaos, including Stevan and all eight Petrović chiefs. Joko was killed by Smaïl-aga himself, and his severed head was impaled on a spike for all to see. Njegoš responded by launching a counter-attack near Grahovo and fought the Ottomans to a standstill. Grahovo's inhabitants fled to the Austrian-held territory on the Adriatic coast, but after being refused sanctuary, they were forced to return to the ruined town, swear an oath of loyalty to the Sultan and beg for forgiveness from the vizier. Consequently, they refused to avenge the deaths of the Petrovićes for fear of Ottoman retaliation.

=== Second visit to Russia ===
News of the defeat at Grahovo soon reached Saint Petersburg and, paired with the allegations of financial misappropriation, cemented his reputation among the Russians as that of an aggressive provocateur. Njegoš immediately sought permission from the chieftains to travel to Saint Petersburg and explain himself before the czar, given that Montenegro was increasingly desperate for Russian financial and political aid. The chieftains gave Njegoš their blessing, and he headed to Vienna before receiving any response from the Russians regarding his initial request. Njegoš was obliged to stay in Vienna for several weeks as the czar contemplated whether to grant him an audience. In Vienna, Njegoš spent more time with Karadžić, who had just returned from researching Slavic linguistic traits in Montenegro and was in the process of writing a German-language ethnographic study on the country titled Montenegro und die Montenegriner ("Montenegro and the Montenegrin"). Njegoš's meetings with Karadžić caught the attention of Austrian Chancellor Klemens von Metternich. Metternich's distrust of Njegoš was exacerbated by the young vladika's request for a visa to travel to France, then considered a breeding ground of radical ideas. Metternich saw to it that the request was denied. In a letter to one of his subordinates, he noted that Njegoš had "spiritually and physically developed". He went on to say that Njegoš had "little respect for the principles of religion and monarchy, is not firm in them, and is given to liberal and revolutionary ideas." He ended his message with a note stating that the Njegoš was to be closely monitored by Austrian agents both abroad and at home.

In 1837, the czar gave Njegoš permission to visit Saint Petersburg, just as a severe famine began to affect Montenegro. Immediately, Njegoš sensed that his second visit to the Russian capital was going to be different from the first. He was not greeted as warmly as he had been in 1833 and the Russians used the opportunity to call him out on several instances of "unmonkish" behaviour, particularly his fondness for being in the company of women. Despite this, Russia increased its annual subsidy and provided wheat to Montenegro's famished citizens. While Montenegro's dependence on Russia often provided the impoverished statelet with desperately needed funding, it was geopolitically disastrous for the Montenegrins, as both the Ottomans and Austrians believed that Montenegrin access to the Adriatic would constitute de facto Russian penetration into the Mediterranean given the nature of Russo−Montenegrin relations.

=== Modernization efforts ===
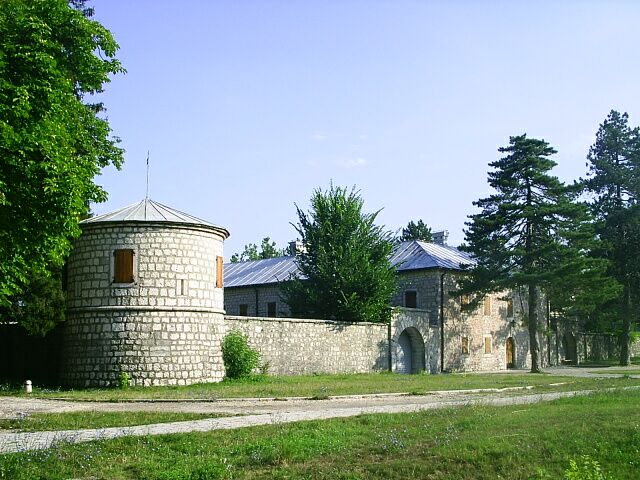
Njegoš began construction of the Biljarda in 1838

Njegoš stayed in Saint Petersburg for less than a month. He was escorted out of the city by Russian Lieutenant Colonel Jakov Nikolaevich Ozeretskovsky, who returned to Cetinje with the Montenegrin delegation to personally observe developments in Montenegro on behalf of the czar. Njegoš's visit to Russia encouraged him to undertake further modernization efforts. The size of both the Perjanici and the Gvardija was increased substantially and Montenegrins caught feuding or conducting raids against Ottoman border towns were more severely punished. Njegoš also opened two gunpowder factories in Rijeka Crnojevića, and built a number of roads and artesian wells. He promoted a pan-Serb identity among his people, persuading Montenegrins to show solidarity with Serbia and stop wearing the fez, a Turkish hat that was commonly worn throughout the Balkans by Muslims and non-Muslims alike. (Note: The reason it survived so long as part of the Montenegrin national costume was due to the widely held belief that it was originally a Serb hat which the Turks had adopted.) Njegoš proposed that Montenegrins instead adopt a traditional round hat (kapa) commonly worn in the region of Kotor. The thin black band that lined its exterior represented mourning for the Serb defeat at the Battle of Kosovo in 1389, and its red top symbolized all the Serbian blood that had been spilt since then. Njegoš also introduced the Obilić Medal for Valour, named after the legendary Serb warrior Miloš Obilić, who is said to have slain the Ottoman Sultan at Kosovo; the medal became Montenegro's highest military decoration and was awarded until Montenegro's union with Serbia in 1918. (Note: Njegoš had originally considered naming the medal after Nikac of Rovine, a famed Montenegrin warrior who killed an Ottoman pasha in the mid-18th century. Eventually, he opted to name it after Obilić instead, as Obilić was a national hero while Nikac of Rovin was a local one.) In keeping with his tendencies towards secularization, Njegoš now insisted on being addressed using royal titles as opposed to religious ones. Ozeretskovsky, now Russian envoy in Cetinje, wrote approvingly of Njegoš's efforts: "Senators, captains, the Gvardija, the Perjanici, all await [Njegoš's] nod. I don't believe that any other country in the world exists where the orders of the ruler are carried out so precisely and so quickly from the lowest to the greatest."

In 1838, Njegoš hosted Saxon King Frederick Augustus II, a keen naturalist who had come to Montenegro to study the country's diverse flora. The king was housed at the Cetinje Monastery, and Njegoš was forced to move from room to room to accommodate him. Displeased by this state of affairs, and irritated by German press reports that described Montenegro as "primitive", Njegoš ordered the construction of a secular dwelling that was to serve as both a royal palace and seat of government. Designed by Ozeretskovsky, the residence was a long, two-storied stone building with twenty-five rooms nestled behind a fortified wall and flanked by defensive towers at all four corners. Located just northeast of the Cetinje Monastery, and facing east towards Constantinople, it was soon dubbed the Biljarda, after the central room on the second floor which contained a billiard table that Njegoš had ordered transported to Montenegro from the Adriatic coast. The residence was within view of an unfinished stone watchtower intended to protect the monastery from cannon fire and whose construction had begun five years earlier, in 1833. When Njegoš realized that its location was unsuitable for a fortress, he ordered that its construction be abandoned, and it was converted into a tower where the heads of decapitated Turkish warriors were impaled on spears and left exposed to the elements. Turkish heads had previously been impaled beside the monastery walls. Dubbed the Tablja, the tower was meant to rival Ali Pasha's citadel in Mostar, where the severed heads of four to five Serbs were displayed at any given time. John Gardner Wilkinson, an English traveler and Egyptologist, saw the Tablja while visiting Cetinje in 1844. He noted the "acrid stench" that the structure exuded and recalled how dogs would tear pieces of flesh and bone away from the rotting heads and drag them across Cetinje. Wilkinson met with both Njegoš and Ali Pasha on separate occasions over the course of his travels and attempted to persuade them to cease beheading their prisoners. Njegoš agreed in principle, but maintained that ceasing to sever the heads of Turkish warriors would be perceived as "weakness" and serve only to invite attack. Ali Pasha objected along similar lines and said that he doubted the good faith of the Montenegrins, whom he claimed were known for their "wanton cruelty".

=== Stand-off at Humac and peace negotiations ===
Clashes between the Christian raia (subject peasantry) and their Ottoman overlords continued following the Battle of Grahovo. In 1838, Njegoš erected a fortress at Humac overlooking Grahovo. The fortress strategically dominated the area, and threatened Ali Pasha's hold on the wider region. Following his second visit to Saint Petersburg, Njegoš was under considerable pressure from the Russians to secure a peace settlement, and the Porte pressure Ali Pasha to do the same. Seeking to avert a wider conflict, Njegoš wrote a letter to Mehmed Pasha Veçihi, the vizier of Bosnia, arguing that Grahovo had been settled by the Montenegrins several generations earlier, that it had paid taxes to the Ottomans for decades while abiding by Montenegrin customary law, and that Muslims and Christians had lived in the area peacefully until Ali Pasha's atrocities two years earlier. Njegoš also sent a letter to Ali Pasha, suggesting that the Turks and Montenegrins restore Grahovo to its former status and offering to guarantee peace in return. In late October, Njegoš met with two envoys representing Ali Pasha and Mehmed Pasha in Cetinje and agreed to a negotiated settlement. The agreement had six points:

1. Displaced inhabitants of Grahovo could return to the town unmolested.
2. Jakov Daković would be declared the hereditary vojvoda of Grahovo.
3. The locals would resume paying taxes to the Turks, which were to be collected by the vojvoda.
4. Both the Turks and Montenegrins would be prohibited from erecting any towers or fortifications on the field of Grahovo.
5. There was to be "eternal peace" between Montenegro—whose independence the agreement acknowledged—and the eyalets of Bosnia and Herzegovina.
6. The agreement would be upheld by Njegoš and Mehmed Pasha.

Despite the agreement, Ali Pasha remained unconvinced. The fifth clause indicated that the Ottomans had recognized Montenegro's independence, while the final clause made no mention of Ali Pasha at all. Indeed, Ali Pasha resented what he viewed as Mehmed Pasha's interference in the affairs of the Herzegovina eyalet and began plotting to undermine the agreement. In early 1839, Njegoš sent a delegation consisting of Daković, vojvoda Radovan Piper, reverend Stevan Kovačević and several others to Bosnia to ascertain the exact amount that the people of Grahovo would be paying to the Sultan. Mehmed Pasha received the Montenegrins well, but when the delegation travelled south to Mostar, Ali Pasha had them arrested. Several warriors from Grahovo went to Mostar in the hope of freeing their kinsmen, but were impaled on Ali Pasha's orders. The Grahovo delegates remained in Ottoman custody until May 1839, when they were released following the arrest of several other Montenegrins who then took their place as Ali Pasha's hostages. For his part, Njegoš backed down on his commitment to raze any Montenegrin fortifications overlooking Grahovo and left the Humac fortress intact, ensuring that the agreement between him and Mehmed Pasha was never implemented.

=== Conspiracy to assassinate Smaïl-aga ===
Smaïl-aga's contribution to the Ottoman victory at Grahovo was so great that the Porte had granted him a personal fiefdom that stretched from Gacko to Kolašin and was larger than all the Montenegrin-held territories combined. These land acquisitions were met with much trepidation by Smaïl-aga's fellow beys, who feared that his rise would threaten their hold on power. In 1839, Serbia's Prince Miloš sent a letter to Ali Pasha informing him that Smaïl-aga would conspire with the Porte to have him removed as vizier of Herzegovina. Ali Pasha promptly wrote to Njegoš, asking that he arrange for Smaïl-aga's murder. He felt that Njegoš—who held Smaïl-aga primarily responsible for the slaughter at Grahovo—would be enthusiastic about the prospect of avenging his kinsmen. Ali Pasha also reasoned that by allowing the Montenegrins to kill the ambitious Herzegovinian bey he would be deflecting suspicion from himself, as the Montenegrins had more than enough reason to want Smaïl-aga dead. In mid-1839, Njegoš began exchanging letters with Smaïl-aga. The letters made it seem that he had forgiven Smaïl-aga for the deaths, and were meant to lull him into a false sense of security.

Between 1836 and 1840, relations between Smaïl-aga and the Christian inhabitants of his land had greatly deteriorated. Smaïl-aga's son, Rustem-beg, drank heavily and often raped women from the Drobnjaci and Pivljani tribes while stopping by their villages to collect tribute. Furious, the Drobnjaci approached Njegoš and asked him for help killing Rustem-beg. Njegoš reasoned that by killing Rustem-beg he would risk infuriating Smaïl-aga, prompting him to seek vengeance against Njegoš, as well as the Drobnjaci and Pivljani. Instead, he persuaded the tribes to assassinate Smaïl-aga himself, as well as his closest associates, leaving Rustem-beg unprotected and powerless to avenge his father's death. The Drobnjaci heeded Njegoš's advice and organized a plot to have Smaïl-aga killed. In early September 1840, some of the Drobnjaci rebelled and refused to pay tribute to Smaïl-aga's son, instead daring Smaïl-aga to come to their villages and collect it himself. Smaïl-aga arranged for a carriage procession to Drobnjaci and set up camp in Mljetičak, a hamlet overlooking the town of Nikšić. On 23 September, he and his delegation were ambushed by a band of 300–400 Drobnjaci warriors led by Novica Cerović, Đoko Malović and Šujo Karadžić. Smaïl-aga attempted to flee but discovered that a spy had hobbled all the horses. He was surrounded in his tent and shot by one of the Drobnjaci warriors; forty other Turks were killed in the ambush. Once Smaïl-aga was dead, the warrior Mirko Aleksić severed his head with an axe. Cerović then took the head to Cetinje and presented it to Njegoš. Satisfied with the outcome of the plot, Njegoš rewarded Cerović by making him a senator.

The killing of Smaïl-aga set in motion a series of attacks which left many Montenegrins and Turks dead. Anxious to conceal his role in the murder, Ali Pasha pretended to be outraged and ordered an attack on the Drobnjaci. More than seventy Drobnjaci warriors were killed, dozens of homes were torched, wells were poisoned and several women were raped. At the same time, Ali Pasha sought to shore up his own position by removing any pretext for intervention by the Porte. He contacted Njegoš and expressed a willingness to engage in peace negotiations. Njegoš was in a quandary; he knew that by failing to avenge the Drobnjaci he risked alienating a sizeable portion of his countrymen. At the same time, Njegoš realized that such negotiations could increase Montenegro's territory and bring about diplomatic recognition by Austria and the Ottomans, who wanted peace and an end to the continuous skirmishing on the Montenegrin–Turkish frontier. In 1841, in an attempt to legitimize his country and under Russian pressure to normalize relations with Austria, Njegoš reached an agreement with the Austrians defining the Austro–Montenegrin border. Despite the agreement, the Austrians failed to officially recognize Montenegro as a sovereign state, and demanded the Montenegrins' complete withdrawal from the coast in exchange for Montenegrin tribesmen being permitted to seek pasturage for their sheep and cattle in Kotor. The withdrawal required the Montenegrins to give up two historic monasteries (Podmaine and Stanjevići), which the Austrians subsequently purchased for a considerable sum. Despite these concessions, the agreement improved trading between the two sides.

In 1842, Njegoš and Ali Pasha met at a Dubrovnik palace to negotiate peace. The two eventually reached an agreement, which was signed before representatives of Austria and Russia. As Njegoš and Ali Pasha emerged from the palace, Ali Pasha produced a bag full of gold coins and tossed them into the air, prompting the Montenegrin delegation—which included several chiefs—to scramble after as many as possible. Through this action, Ali Pasha effectively demonstrated Montenegro's poverty before the Austrians and Russians, embarrassing Njegoš in the process.

=== Osman Pasha's invasion of southern Montenegro ===
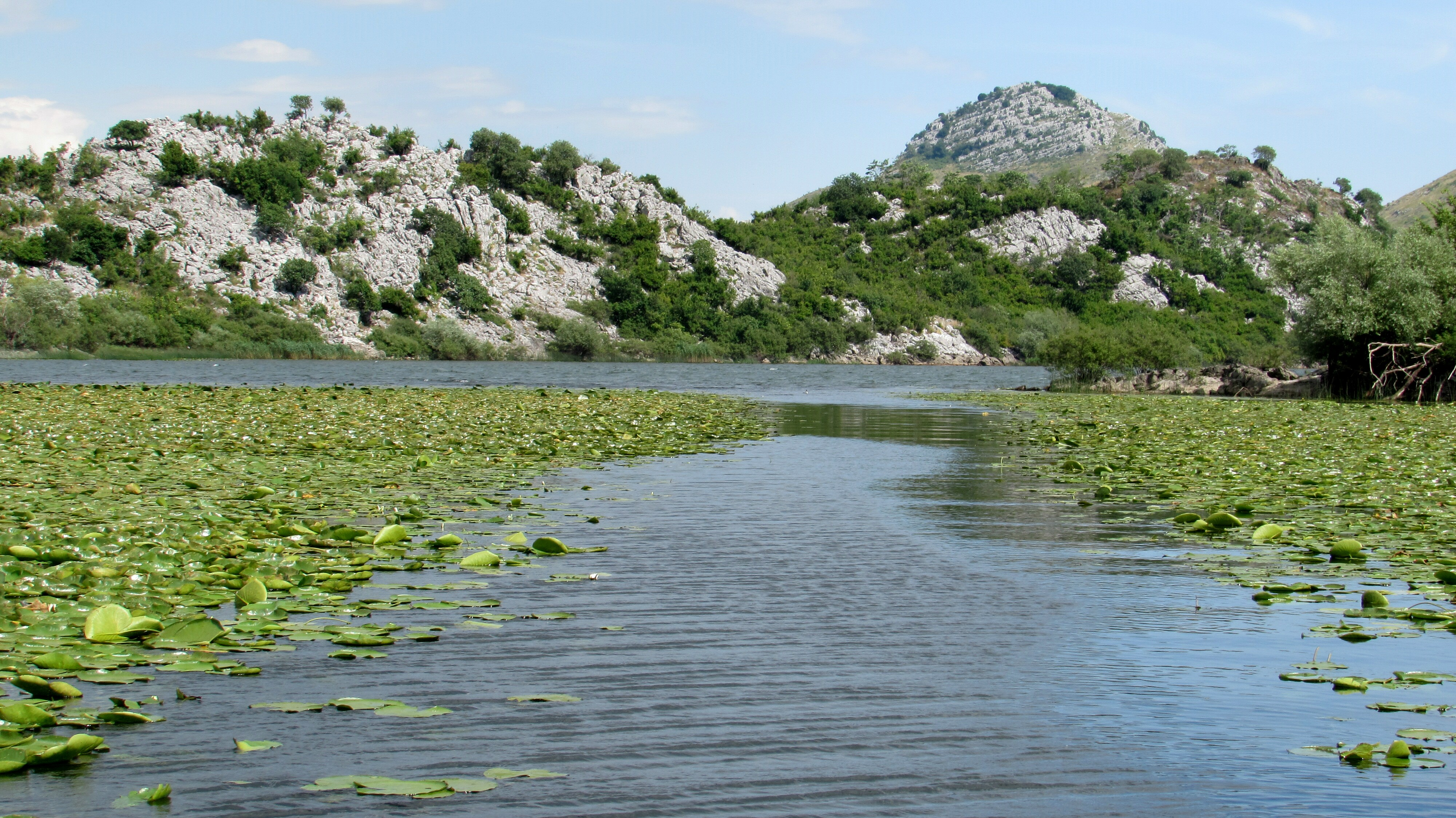
The island of Vranjina

Osman Pasha, the vizier of Scutari, was an exceptional politician and military leader. Despite his Serb origin, he held a deep hatred for Montenegro, and Njegoš in particular. As Smaïl-aga's son-in-law, he blamed the Montenegrins for his grisly death, and also wished to follow in the footsteps of his father, Suleiman Pasha, who had played a key role in crushing the First Serbian Uprising in 1813. Osman Pasha invaded southern Montenegro in 1843, and his forces soon seized the strategically important islands of Vranjina and Lesendro on Lake Skadar. The capture of these islands rendered Montenegrin trading excursions to towns such as Podgorica and Scutari nearly impossible. The Porte sensed an opportunity to bring Montenegro in line, and offered to recognize Njegoš as secular ruler of Montenegro if he in turn recognized the Porte's sovereignty over his country. Njegoš refused, and attempted to retake the islands by force. The Montenegrin forces had no artillery to speak of, and each one of their attempts to recapture the islands resulted in failure. Njegoš tried to enlist foreign support, particularly from Russia and France. To Njegoš's surprise, the Russians were not interested in entangling themselves in the dispute. The French, although sympathetic, failed to intervene. The United Kingdom, as it usually did prior to the premiership of William Ewart Gladstone, sided with the Ottomans. When Njegoš attempted to construct ships to retake the islands, the Austrians maneuvered to prevent it, and later refused to supply the munitions needed to arrange a counterattack.

=== Osman Pasha ===
A severe drought struck Montenegro in late 1846, followed by a catastrophic famine in 1847. Osman Pasha took advantage of Montenegro's misfortune and promised some of the Montenegrin chieftains large amounts of wheat if they rose up against the Petrovićes. Njegoš was caught off-guard, having spent much of late 1846 in Vienna overseeing the publication of his epic poem, Gorski vijenac (The Mountain Wreath). The leaders of the rebellion were Markiša Plamenac, a captain with the Perjanici in Crmnica, and Todor Božović, a senator from the Piperi tribe. Plamenac had been one of Njegoš's close confidants. According to legend, he planned to become a member of the Petrović clan by marrying the daughter of Njegoš's brother Pero, thus increasing his own power and standing. When Pero married his daughter off to Plamenac's cousin, the son of reverend Jovan Plamenac, the once-loyal captain switched sides and became an agent of Osman Pasha. On 26 March [O.S. 14 March] 1847, Plamenac led a band of rebels in an assault against lower Crmnica alongside the Turks. Fortunately for Njegoš, some members of the Plamenac tribe had remained loyal to the Petrovićes. About two weeks later, a force of about 2,000 Petrovićes, Katuni and Plamenac tribesmen forced the Turks out of Crmnica. Plamenac fled Montenegro and sought refuge with the vizier, persuading him to erect an Ottoman fortification on the island of Grmožur to keep Njegoš's forces at bay. Njegoš countered by building a defensive tower overlooking Lake Skadar.

Unable to subdue the Ottomans militarily, Njegoš concentrated on eliminating those who had betrayed him and his clan. Several weeks after the insurrection was crushed, he informed Božović that he had forgiven him and gave him his word that he and his two brothers would not be harmed if they returned to Cetinje. The two sides arranged to meet in a small village just outside the town. Instead of going to see the brothers, Njegoš sent several henchmen to meet them on his behalf. The Božovićes were arrested and executed by firing squad; their bodies were put on public display as a warning against further insubordination. In early November, Plamenac was shot to death by a fellow Montenegrin in Ottoman-held territory. The assassin was arrested by the Ottomans, and hanged in Scutari. Njegoš posthumously awarded him an Obilić Medal. Osman Pasha soon incited a second revolt; it was also suppressed and Njegoš had all the rebels shot. He then sent an assassin to Scutari in a failed attempt to have Osman Pasha killed. Osman Pasha subsequently sent a number of his own assassins to kill Njegoš, who survived several attempted poisonings and an attempted bombing of his headquarters. By 1848, the situation on Montenegro's southern border had stabilized.

=== Role in the rise of South Slav nationalism ===
By the mid-1840s, the idea of unifying all South Slavs into a common state had gained much support from Serbs, Croats and Bosnian Muslims living in the Austrian Empire. Njegoš's travels to Austria and Italy exposed him to many of the concepts that eventually formed the backbone of the Illyrianist movement, notably that all South Slavs share common cultural and linguistic traits and are, as such, one people. His correspondence with South Slavic nationalist leaders in neighbouring lands disturbed the Austrians, who wished to avoid a South Slav uprising in the Habsburg territories. Consequently, Vienna increased its surveillance of the vladika and intercepted all his correspondence, amid widespread turmoil during the revolutions of 1848. That year, Njegoš supported the efforts of the pan-Slavist Ban Josip Jelačić to resist the implementation of Hungarian as the official language of Croatia. Njegoš soon became disillusioned with Jelačić due to his siding with the House of Habsburg against the Hungarians, believing that such an alliance was ultimately detrimental to the goal of South Slavic unification. Later that year, Njegoš began exchanging letters with Prince Aleksandar of Serbia and the politician Ilija Garašanin, who sought to acquire Serbia access to the sea and revive the medieval Serbian Empire. Montenegro's geographic location made it particularly significant to Garašanin because of its proximity to the Adriatic. In April 1848, Njegoš secretly hosted Serbian emissary Matija Ban in Cetinje. The two discussed plans for instigating an uprising in Bosnia, Herzegovina and "Old Serbia" (Kosovo and Macedonia), seeking to take advantage of the revolutionary fervor sweeping through Europe. Whereas the Serbians were more focused on destabilizing the Ottoman establishment in Kosovo and Macedonia, Njegoš was more immediately concerned with the situation in neighbouring Herzegovina. Despite these differences, Njegoš and Prince Aleksandar agreed that, in the event of a unified Serbian state, Prince Aleksandar was to be proclaimed the hereditary secular leader of the Serb people while Njegoš would become the Patriarch of a unified Serbian Orthodox Church.

=== Last years and death ===
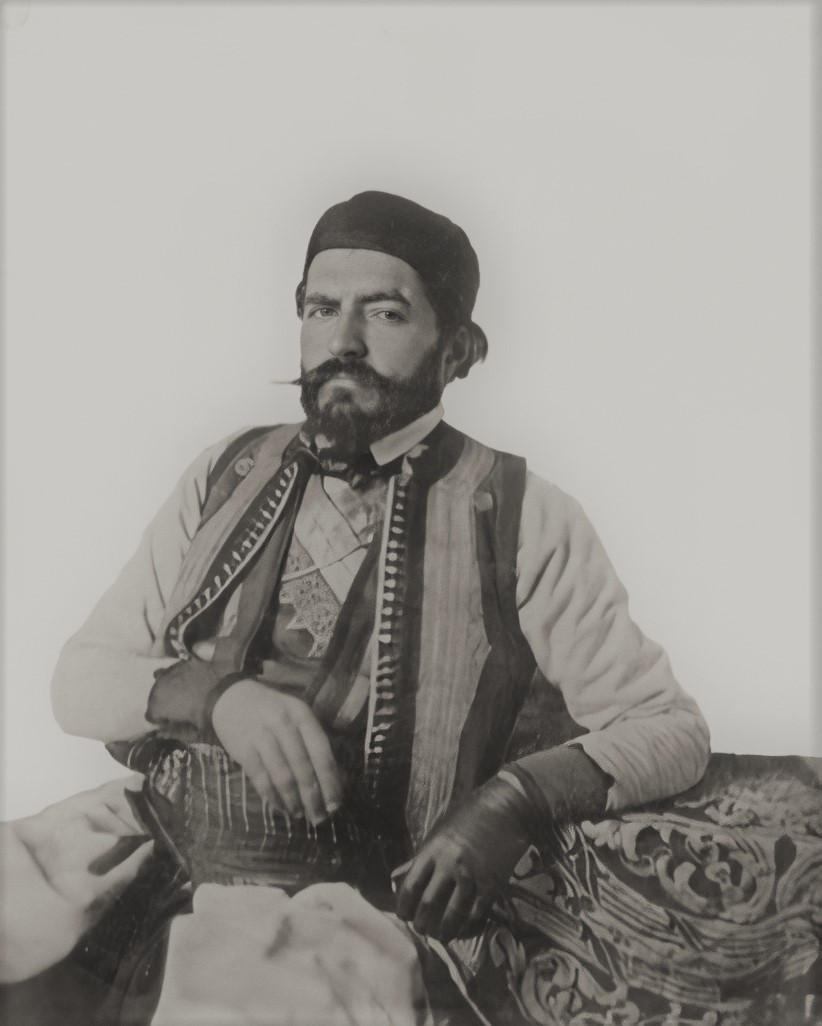
The only known photograph of Njegoš, taken shortly before his death by Anastas Jovanović in the summer of 1851

By 1849, Njegoš began experiencing an incessant cough and soon a doctor from Kotor discovered that he had tuberculosis. By early 1850, it was clear that the condition was life-threatening. Painfully aware that Montenegro did not have a single trained physician, he travelled to Kotor in the spring and composed his last will and testament, intending for it to prevent the power struggle that had preceded his own accession to the position of vladika. He mailed the will to vice-consul Gagić in Dubrovnik with a message asking him to return the document unopened in the event that he regained his health. Njegoš then headed to Venice and Padua, where he spent much time resting and seemingly succeeded in containing his illness. His cough returned after eight days; he left Padua and went back to Montenegro in the hope that the country's fresh mountain air would alleviate his symptoms. He spent the summer of 1850 resting and writing poetry. His condition prevented him from lying down, so he had to keep in a constant upright position, even when sleeping. By November 1850, the cough abated and Njegoš undertook another journey to Italy. He reached Italy in January 1851, and travelled through Venice, Milan, Genoa and Rome. He visited the ruins of Pompeii with Serbian writer Ljubomir Nenadović, and the two men travelled together along Italy's western coast discussing philosophy and contemporary politics. The journey was documented in a book Nenadović published following Njegoš's death, titled Letters from Italy.

While staying in Italy, Njegoš was disturbed by reports of Omar Pasha's plans to invade Montenegro. (Note: A Serb convert to Islam, Ottoman General Omar Pasha crushed a Muslim-led revolt in central Bosnia and western Herzegovina in 1850, had its leaders (including Ali Pasha) executed on the Sultan's behalf, and abolished the Herzegovina Eyalet before setting his sights on Montenegro.) He planned another visit to Saint Petersburg to enlist Russian support, but the czar refused to meet him. Njegoš headed back to Montenegro in the summer, having consulted physicians in Vienna on his way back. While in Vienna, he encountered Serbian photographer Anastas Jovanović, who persuaded him to pose for a picture in his studio. Jovanović's calotype portrait is the only known photograph of Njegoš in existence. Jovanović also photographed a group of Perjanici that had accompanied Njegoš on his journey to Italy, as well as the chieftains Mirko Petrović and Petar Vukotić. Njegoš returned to Cetinje in August 1851, with his health rapidly deteriorating. He died there on 31 October [O.S. 19 October] 1851, surrounded by his closest associates and just two weeks shy of his thirty-eighth birthday. Eyewitnesses reported his last words as "love Montenegro and render justice to the poor."

Njegoš's will named Danilo Petrović, the son of Njegoš's cousin, Stanko Stijepov, as his successor. Danilo had been sent to acquire a basic education in Russia the year before the vladika's death, and was not in Montenegro at the time. When Njegoš died, Đorđije disregarded the will and appeared before the Governing Senate asking that the senators proclaim Pero the new vladika. Danilo returned from Russia in 1852, bringing with him a letter authored by the Russian czar which made it clear that Saint Petersburg endorsed Danilo's accession, not Pero's. In the ensuing power struggle, Đorđije and Pero lost the support of most of the tribal chiefs, and they and their families were forced into exile. Pero sought refuge in Kotor, where his wife gave birth to a boy. In the hope of preserving his brother's memory, Pero named the newborn Rade, but the child died after only two months. Pero himself died in 1854 without having produced any male offspring, thus extinguishing the male line of Njegoš's parents. Njegoš's mother died in 1858, and his father lived into his late nineties, having outlived all three of his sons.

== Burial ==
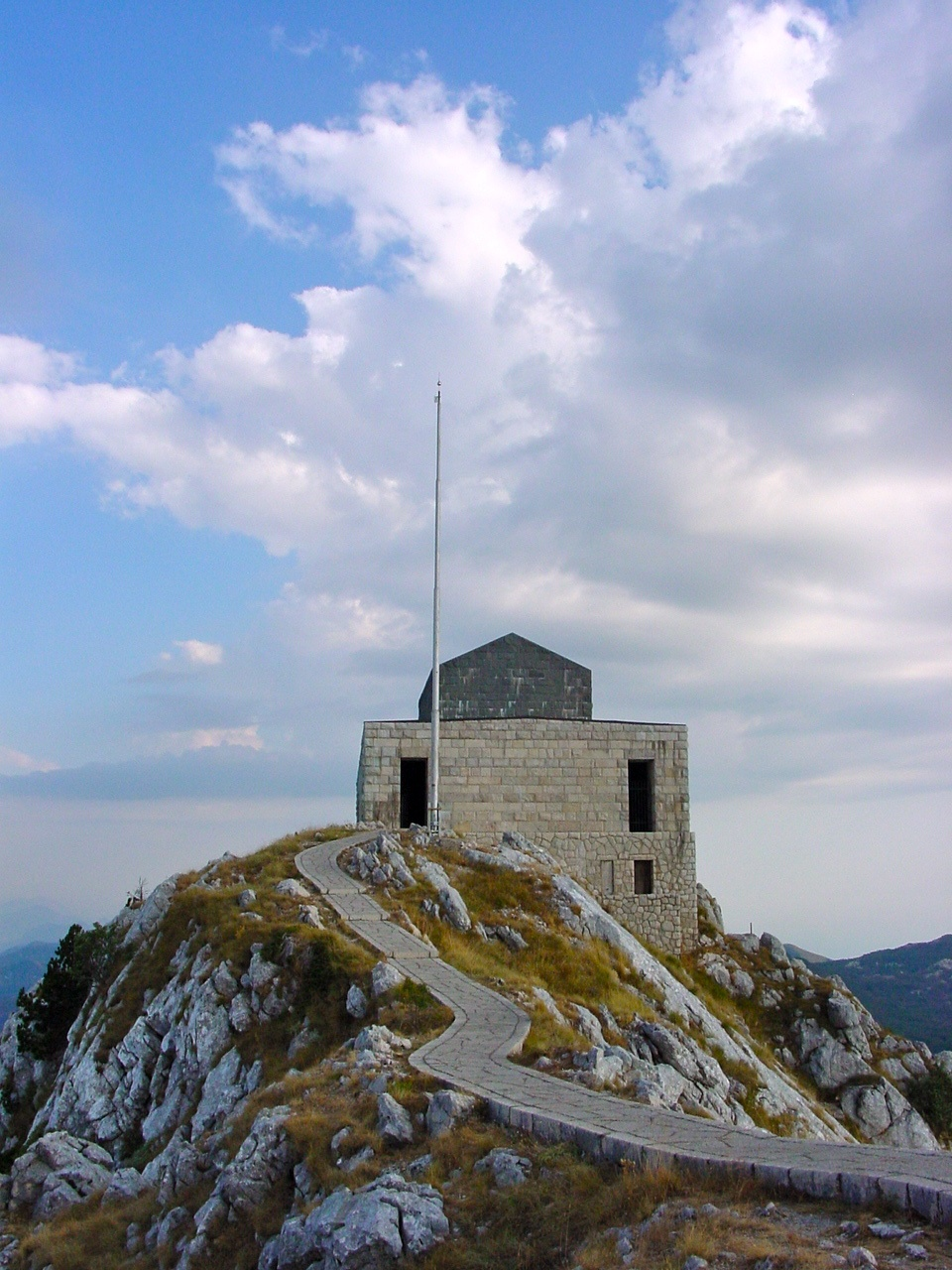
The Mausoleum of Njegoš was opened in 1974.

Prior to his death, Njegoš had asked to be buried atop Mount Lovćen, in a chapel dedicated to his predecessor. He had designed the chapel himself, and oversaw its construction in 1845. Following his death in October 1851, Njegoš was interred at the Cetinje Monastery. His remains were transferred to Mount Lovćen in 1855. They remained there until 1916, when during the First World War, Montenegro was occupied by Austria-Hungary and the Habsburg occupiers decided to erect a monument to Austrian Emperor Franz Joseph on Mount Lovćen. Not wishing for a monument to the Austrian Emperor to be located on the same perch as a symbol of South Slavic national feeling, Austro-Hungarian authorities demanded that Njegoš's remains be moved back to Cetinje. The Montenegrins had little choice in the matter and the remains were removed under the supervision of Serbian Orthodox clergy so that the Austro-Hungarians would not be accused of desecration. By the end of the war, Njegoš's chapel was severely damaged. Local authorities negotiated with the Yugoslav government for years over the question of where, when and at whose expense Njegoš was to be buried. Montenegrin officials favoured restoring the original chapel, while the authorities in Belgrade opened a competition over the designs of a planned mausoleum. Some of the plans differed greatly from the original Byzantinesque building. Due to lack of funds, plans for a mausoleum were discarded by 1925 and the original church building was reconstructed. In September 1925, in the course of a three-day ceremony sponsored and attended by Yugoslavia's King Alexander and Queen Maria, the chapel was rededicated and Njegoš's remains were reburied. Historian Andrew B. Wachtel writes: "The tone of the event, which was described extensively in the Yugoslav press, bordered on a piety more appropriate for the treatment of a saint than a writer."

At the end of the Second World War, Yugoslavia came under communist rule. In 1952, Yugoslavia's communist authorities decided to replace Njegoš's chapel with a secular mausoleum designed by Ivan Meštrović. Wachtel suggests that this was done to "de-Serbianize" Njegoš and eliminate any trace of the chapel's Byzantine design. In the late 1960s the chapel was demolished, and a mausoleum was constructed by 1971. Njegoš's remains were transferred back to Mount Lovćen in 1974, and the mausoleum was officially inaugurated that year.

== Literary works ==
=== Influences and style ===
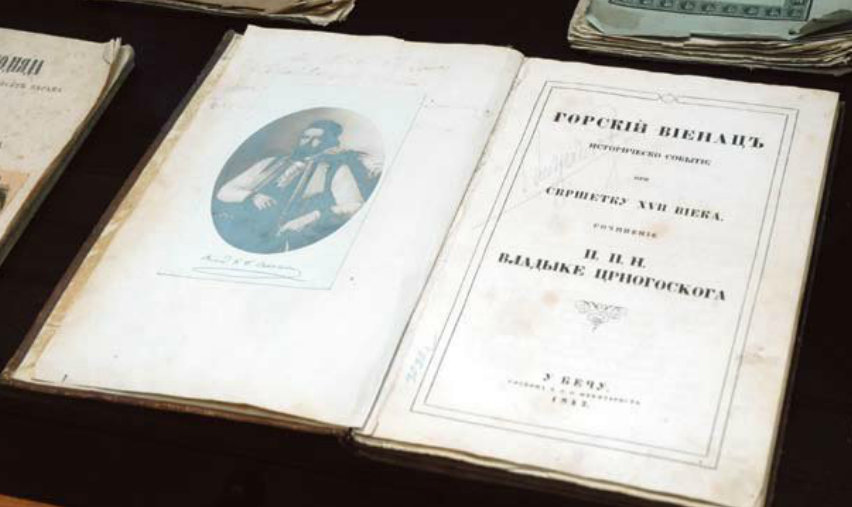
A first edition copy of Gorski vijenac (The Mountain Wreath; 1847)

Despite being Montenegro's ruler for more than twenty years, Njegoš is best known for his literary output. His writings drew on Serb folklore, lyric poetry and biblical stories. He began writing poetry at the age of seventeen, and his literary opus includes Glas kamenštaka (The Voice of a Stone-Cutter; 1833), Lijek jarosti turske (The Cure for Turkish Fury; 1834), Ogledalo srpsko (The Serbian Mirror; 1835), Luča mikrokozma (The Ray of the Microcosm; 1845), Gorski vijenac (The Mountain Wreath; 1847), Lažni car Šćepan mali (The False Tsar Stephen the Little; 1851) and, posthumously, Slobodijada (The Freedom Song; 1854). His most famous works are Luča mikrokozma, Gorski vijenac and Lažni car Šćepan mali, all epic poems.

The historian Zdenko Zlatar argues that Njegoš's mentor (and later secretary) Sima Milutinović influenced him more than any other person, noting that while Milutinović "was not a great poet or playwright [...] no one in Cetinje or for that matter the whole of Montenegro had a better knowledge of the wider world." Indeed, Milutinović introduced Njegoš to his own poetry, which Professor Svetlana Slapšak describes as being "written in unusual syntax, with unparalleled neologisms and fantastic etymologies". The position of Njegoš's secretary was later occupied by Dimitrije Milaković, a physically disabled Dubrovnik-born polyglot who had studied philosophy in Vienna and came to Montenegro with Vukotić and Vučićević in 1832. Milaković operated the printing press at Cetinje Monastery, served as editor-in-chief of Grlica and edited all Njegoš's works prior to their publication. Njegoš was also a great admirer of the Serbian revolutionary Karađorđe, who led the First Serbian Uprising, and dedicated Gorski vijenac to his memory. The linguist Vuk Karadžić influenced Njegoš through his reforms of the Serbian language, and used his own fame to popularize Njegoš's work. Moreover, he introduced Njegoš to his inner circle, which included some of the leading Serb poets of the day, such as Branko Radičević and Milica Stojadinović-Srpkinja. Njegoš was also impacted by the works of foreign writers, such as Dante Alighieri's Divine Comedy and John Milton's Paradise Lost; their influence can be strongly felt in Luča mikrokozma.

Slapšak notes that Njegoš was born into a culture with an almost exclusively oral storytelling tradition, where the only written works were of a religious nature or recounted the history of Montenegro. Describing his mastery of the traditional oral epic, she asserts that it was the "only adequate, literary genre of his age", one that allowed him "to interpret [his] community for the world and for himself in the language of poetry." Multiple scholars have also noted similarities between the chorus of Ancient Greek tragedies and that of Gorski vijenac (the kolo, which represents the collective voice of Montenegro's inhabitants, reflecting their hopes, fears and desires.) The epic also features similar character roles, such as that of the pensive ruler (Danilo), the hero (Vuk Mandušić), the blind prophetic monk (iguman Stefan) and the lamenting woman (Batrić's sister).

=== Critical reception ===
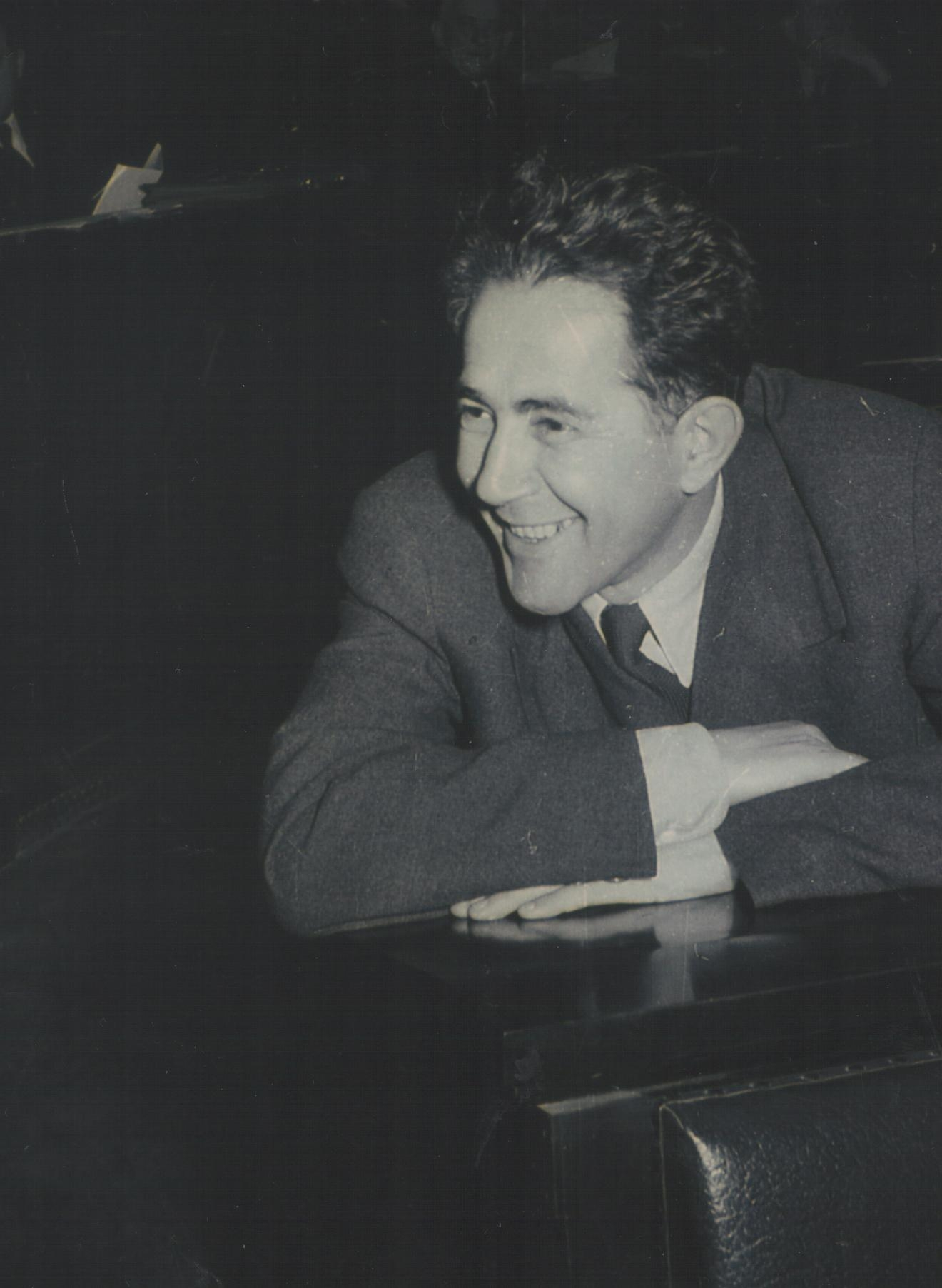
Milovan Đilas's Njegoš: Poet, Prince, Bishop (1966) is arguably the most extensive work about the vladika in any language.

Most of what was written about Njegoš during his lifetime was the work of foreigners (officials, scholars or travelers). One of the earliest detailed academic analyses of Njegoš's works was published by Milan Rešetar in 1890. Following the establishment of a common South Slav state in 1918, scholars reinterpreted Njegoš in a Yugoslav light, despite some of his writings being decidedly anti-Muslim and having the potential to alienate Yugoslavia's Muslim citizens, who formed about ten percent of the new country's population. During the interwar period, future Nobel Prize winner Ivo Andrić wrote extensively about Njegoš and his works, and published several papers on the vladika's poetry after the war, as well. Other authors who wrote about Njegoš include Mihailo Lalić, Isidora Sekulić and Anica Savić Rebac.

A former politician and leading Marxist theoretician, Djilas wrote a lengthy study of Njegoš's life and works in the late 1950s while serving a prison sentence after a row with Yugoslavia's communist leadership. The manuscript was smuggled out of the prison by Djilas' associates in the early 1960s and taken to the West, where it was edited, translated from the original Serbo-Croatian into English, and published under the title Njegoš: Poet, Prince, Bishop, in 1966. The book remains the only English-language biography of Njegoš, and the subsequent Serbo-Croatian edition (1988) is likely the most extensive study of his life in that language, as well. Djilas himself was a great admirer of Njegoš, and later recounted that Gorski vijenac was the only text that he always carried by his side during the Second World War.

Njegoš's writings have received varying degrees of scholarly and critical attention since his death. Some studies have been written about Luča mikrokozma, though very little has been written about Lažni car Šćepan mali, which Djilas believes contains some of Njegoš's finest verse. Of all Njegoš's writings, the one that has been the subject of most scholarly analysis is Gorski vijenac, which virtually all critics regard as his finest work. It is also his most famous, having been reprinted more than 120 times between 1847 and 1996. By 1913, Gorski vijenac had been translated into ten different languages. It has been translated into English twice – once by James W. Wiles, in 1930, and the second time by Vasa D. Mihailovich, in 1986. Set in the early 1700s, the epic revolves around Njegoš's ancestor, vladika Danilo, as he ponders what to do with the Montenegrins who have converted to Islam amid increasing Ottoman encroachment. Danilo knows that every Montenegrin has a responsibility towards his family and towards his clan, for to kill a fellow Montenegrin would elicit a blood feud, but he also realizes that each man has a duty towards his faith and towards his nation, and that these two strains of responsibility are completely irreconcilable. Ultimately, the Montenegrin Christians give their Muslim kin the option of returning to Christianity or of facing death. On Christmas Day, those that refuse to comply are killed and their villages burned. In light of its subject matter, Gorski vijenac became a source of considerable controversy during and after the Yugoslav Wars, when critics began to re-examine the text within the context of the conflicts' many atrocities. Judah goes as far as to call it a "paean to ethnic cleansing". He writes: "In the wake of another Balkan War, its significance is that of a missing link. It helps explain how the Serbian national consciousness has been molded and how ideas of national liberation became inextricably intertwined with killing your neighbour and burning his village." Some scholars have even claimed that the epic is based on a historical massacre from the late 17th century. Djilas notes that no such event is mentioned in an authoritative history of Montenegro that was written by Danilo's successor, Vasilije, and published in 1756. Thus, Djilas concludes that the Christmas Day massacre is either entirely fictional or that the elimination of Montenegrin Muslims occurred in stages over a long period of time, as opposed to a single atrocity eradicating them all. Srdja Pavlović contends that the massacre is a conflation of two historical events – the widespread conversion of Montenegrins to Islam in 1485 and the expulsion of the Medojević family from Montenegro in 1704, following a property dispute. There is no scholarly consensus as to whether the Christmas Day massacre ever occurred.

== Legacy ==
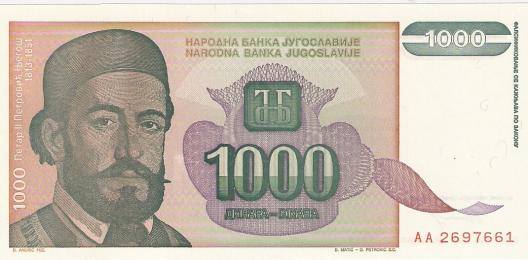
1,000 Yugoslav dinar note (1994)

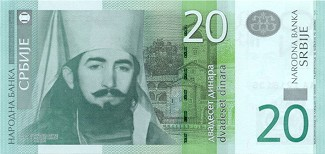
20 Serbian dinars note (2006)

Njegoš is regarded as an ambitious, able ruler who was esteemed during and after his lifetime. He is remembered for laying the foundation for the modern Montenegrin state as well as for being one of the most acclaimed South Slavic poets of his time. Since his death, Njegoš has remained a Serbian political and cultural father. During the late 19th and early 20th centuries, a variety of political factions (including Serbian nationalists, Yugoslavs and communists) drew inspiration from his works. In the decades after Njegoš' death, Gorski vijenac became the Montenegrin national epic, reaffirming its connections to the Serbian and Christian worlds and celebrating the military skill of its warriors. For Serbs, the poem was significant because it evoked themes similar to the Kosovo epics and reminded them of their solidarity with Montenegro against the Ottoman Turks. Like many of his contemporaries, Gavrilo Princip, the assassin of Archduke Franz Ferdinand of Austria, knew Gorski vijenac off by heart.

Njegoš's influence parallels that of Shakespeare in the English-speaking world and his language – though archaic – has supplied modern Serbian with a number of well known quotations. The epic has become the basic educational text for Montenegrins and Serbs. In Montenegro it was (and still is) learnt by heart, and has been integrated into oral tradition. Njegoš's picture can often be seen in taverns, offices, hospitals, on Yugoslav and Serbian currency and in people's homes in Montenegro and Serbia. After the founding of Yugoslavia in the early 20th century, Njegoš was twice declared Yugoslavia's national poet, by the royal government in the 1920s and by the communist authorities following the Second World War. In 1947, the 100th anniversary of the publication of Gorski vijenac, the government promoted Njegoš as a Montenegrin poet rather than a Serb. The change in Njegoš's ethnicity may have been related to the communist policy of Brotherhood and Unity and its promotion of a Montenegrin ethnic identity (which the communists had proclaimed distinct from that of Serbs in 1943). Njegoš' works, particularly Gorski vijenac, have been sources of collective identity for Serbs, Montenegrins and Yugoslavs. Njegoš's works have been removed from school curricula in Bosnia and Herzegovina so as not to incite ethnic tensions, given the divisive nature of some of his works.

In 2013, Njegoš was regionally canonized within the Serbian Orthodox eparchy of Montenegro and the Littoral as Saint Petar of Lovćen, with his feast day celebrated on 19 May (6 May according to the old calendar). In 2017, the first church dedicated to him was opened in Bar.

== Notes ==
Preceded by Petar I Petrović-Njegoš	Prince-Bishop of Montenegro; 1830–1851	Succeeded by Danilo Petrović Njegoš
Preceded by Petar I Petrović-Njegoš	Metropolitan of Cetinje; 1830–1851	Succeeded by Nikanor Ivanović
