= The Ray of the Microcosm =

1845 cosmic-religious poem by Petar II Petrović-Njegoš

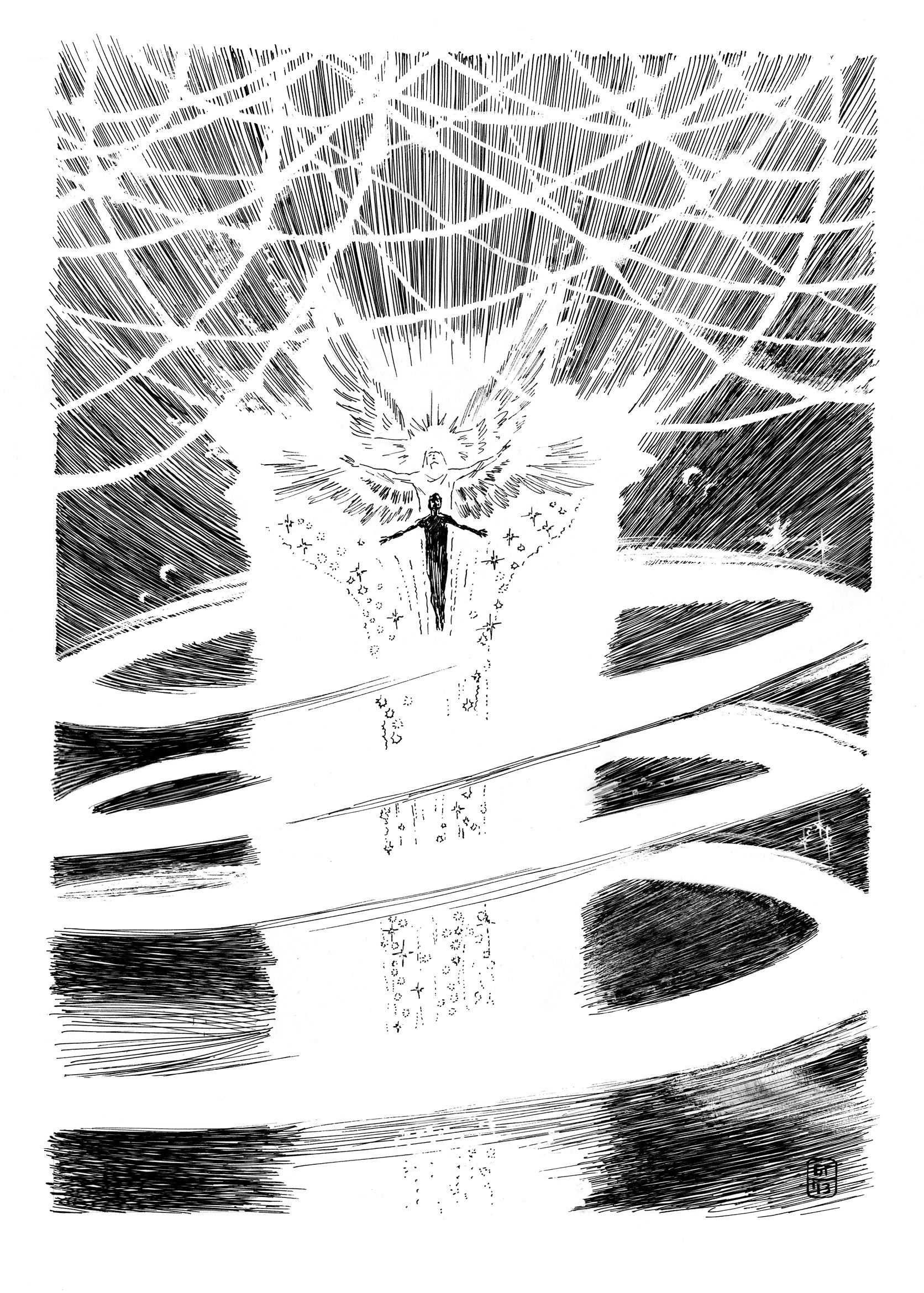
Illustration "Angel leads the Poet" by Borivoje Grbić for "The Ray of the Microcosm"

“The Ray of the Microcosm” (Serbian Cyrillic: Луча микрокозма, romanized: Luča mikrokozma) is a romantic, cosmic-religious poem, written in 1845 by Prince-Bishop and poet Petar II Petrović-Njegoš. It is written in the decasyllabic meter of Serb epic poetry. Njegoš’s religious poetic thought achieved its highest artistic shape in this work.

The poem contains three main thematic parts. The first is the Dedication, which introduces some of the most important philosophical and religious premises of the poem. The second part consists of two cantos, which describe the cosmic flight of the poet’s soul and its search for answers about the origins and destiny of humankind on Earth. The third part comprises the remaining four cantos, which describe Satan’s mutiny against God and the fall of Adam and his legion from Heaven.
