= Lesendro =

Island and fortress in Lake Skadar, Montenegro

Coordinates: 42°16′18″N 19°07′11″E

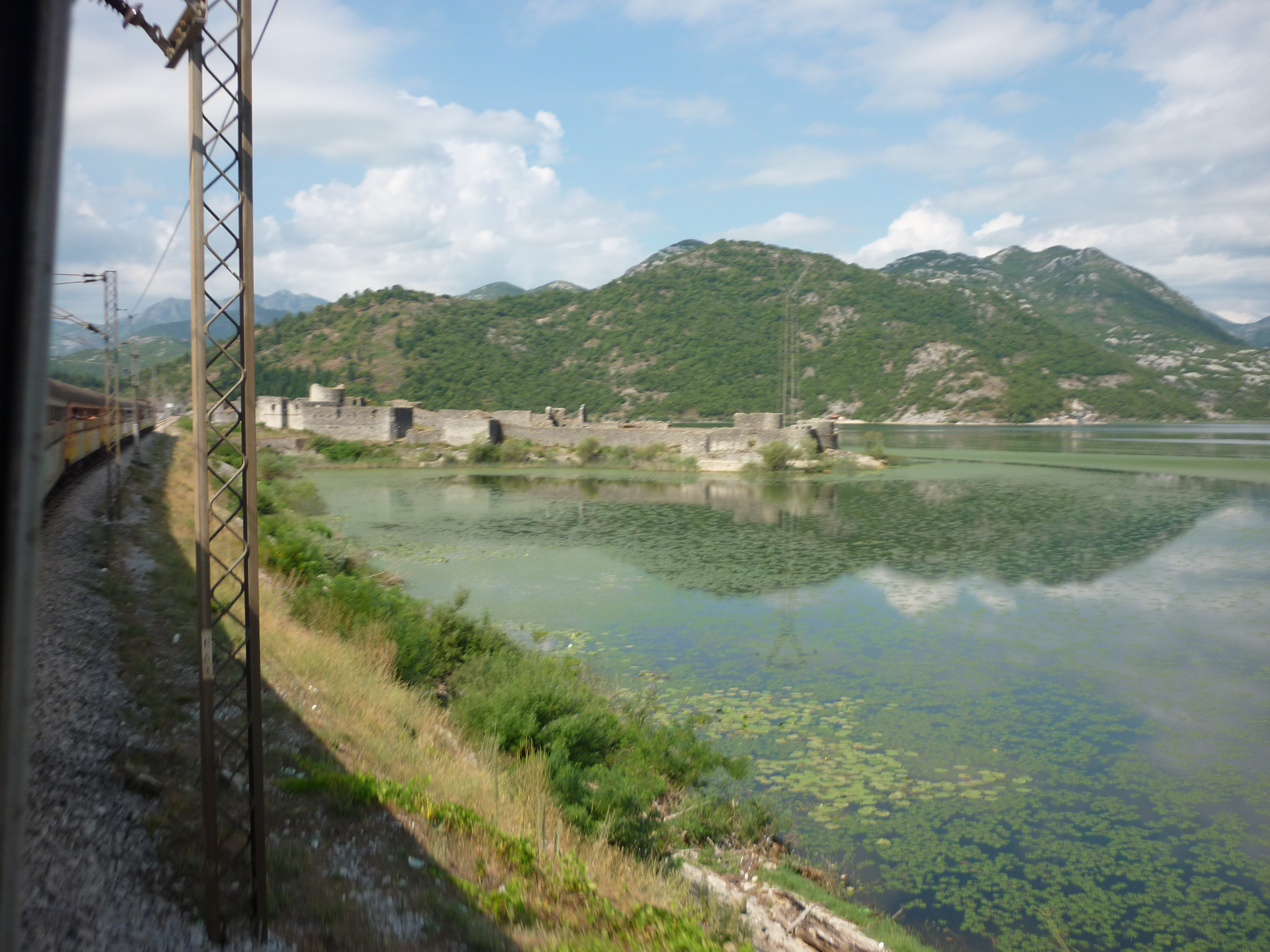
- Lesendro fortress, view from Belgrade - Bar railway
- Interactive map of Lesendro

Geography
- Location: Lake Skadar

Administration
- Montenegro

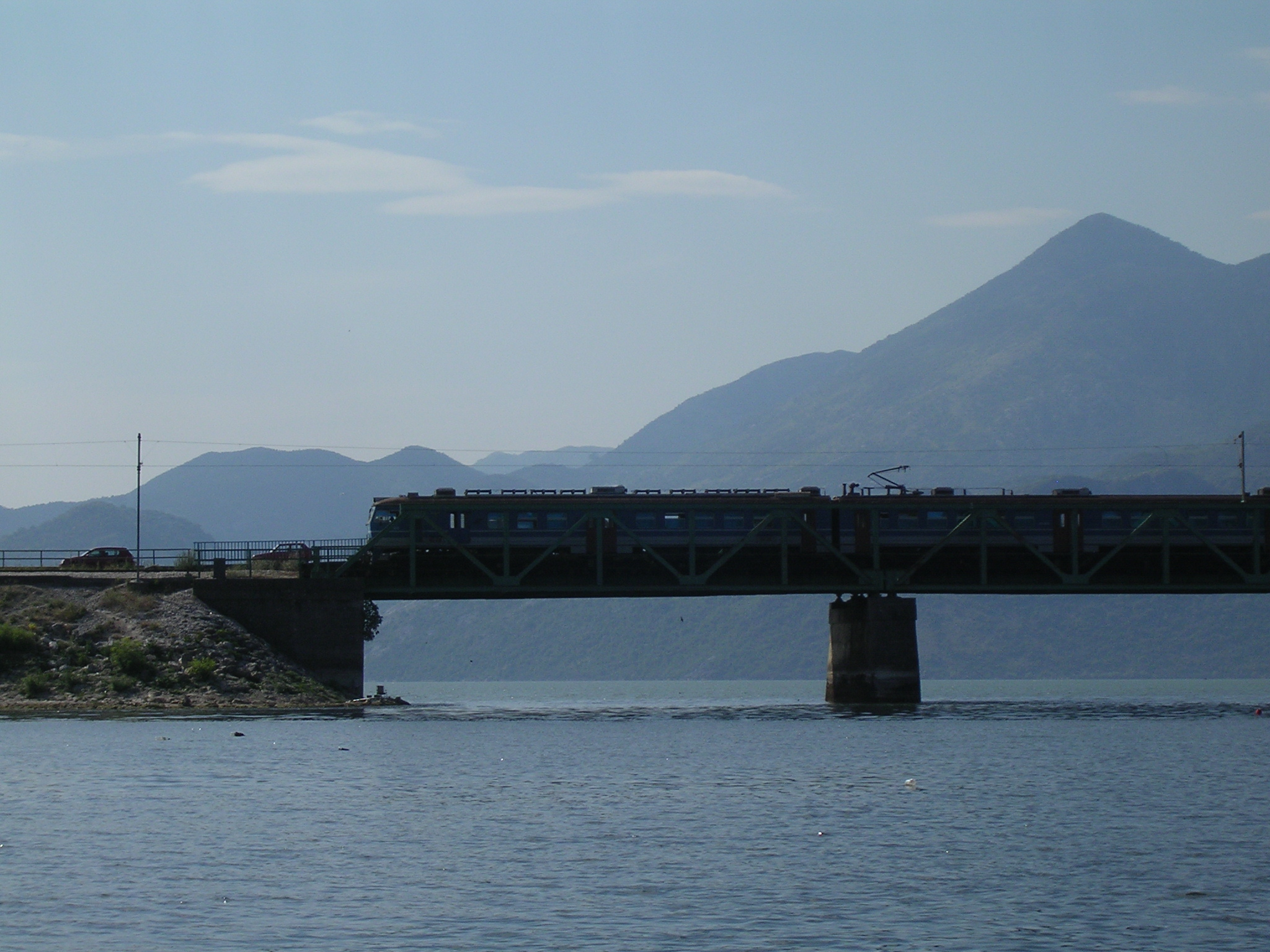
Train passes Lesendro causeway

Lesendro (Montenegrin: Лесендро) is an island and a fortress in Skadar Lake in Montenegro. It is located near the small town of Vranjina. The fort was built in the 18th century. It is located on a peninsula, which until the construction of the Belgrade–Bar railway was an island.

== History ==
During the reign of Petar II Petrović-Njegoš, a fortress served as a defense against Ottoman attacks and provided for undisturbed fishing and trade; Petar II himself often came here to rest.

Lesendro was 11 years under the rule of the Prince-Bishopric of Montenegro until 1843, when Osman Pasha occupied Lesendro, at the same time as Vranjina and the Ottoman Turks made their fortifications there. The island was liberated in 1878 along with the fortress town of Žabljak Crnojevića, which were annexed to the Principality of Montenegro.
