= Grlica =

Montenegrin magazine

The cover of the 1836 issue of Grlica.

Grlica (Cyrillic: Грлица; English: The Turtledove) was the first serial publication published in Montenegro. It was published from 1835 to 1839 in Cetinje, and was largely edited by Dimitrije Milaković, personal secretary of Prince-Bishop Petar II Petrović-Njegoš. It served as both a calendar, as well as an almanach, and was primarily aimed at the youth. Heavily influenced by Romanticism, Grlica was similar in content and purpose to Vuk Karadžić's Danica and ideas of Pan-Slavism and Yugoslavism were common themes.

== History ==
The first edition of Grlica came out in 1835, one year after the establishment of the Metropolitanate's printing press in 1834. Prince-Bishop Petar II Petrović-Njegoš ordered the printing of a calendar to commemorate the 340th anniversary of the Crnojević printing house.

The publishing of Grlica coincided with the first serialized publication in the Principality of Serbia, the Novine srbske, as well as Ljudevit Gaj's Novine horvatzke published in Zagreb. According to Georgije Nikolajević, Grlica was one of the Illyrian and Pan-Slavic publications of its time along with the Slovak Zora, the Serbian Golubica and the Dalmatian Ljubitelj prosveštenija.

Each edition from 1835 to 1839 was edited by Dimitrije Milaković, personal secretary of the Prince-Bishop, except in 1837 when Milaković was staying in the Russian Empire. The 1837 edition was edited by archimandrite Petronije Lujanović.

== Content ==
Grlica was established under the order of Prince-Bishop Njegoš, and was primarily aimed at the youth. It was in part a calendar, as well as an almanach, printing original contributions as well as translations. Its most frequent collaborators were Njegoš, Dimitrije Milaković and Sima Milutinović Sarajlija.

The publication of Grlica marked the beginning of the codification of epic events from Montenegro's modern history. Heavily influenced by Romanticism, Grlica was similar in content and purpose to Vuk Karadžić's Danica. Ideas of Pan-Slavism and Yugoslavism were common themes.

Grlica featured several standardized sections. Beginning with a calendar, it further presented the names and genealogies of ruling European monarchs in each issue. Other sections included a column on science, epic poetry, authored poetry and an entertainment section. The science section was mostly concerned with history, geography and ethnography, and was authored by Dimitrije Milaković. Here, he described a short account of the geography and demographics of Montenegro, and in the 1838 edition, of the Bay of Kotor. A major contribution was also the short history of Montenegro, authored by Prince-Bishop Petar I, written down and edited by Milaković, describing the history of Montenegro from 1711 to 1830.
