= Jasenica, Mostar =

Jasenica
- Village
- Location within Bosnia and Herzegovina
- Coordinates: 43°16′50″N 17°48′15″E
- Country: Bosnia and Herzegovina
- Entity: Federation of Bosnia and Herzegovina
- Canton: Herzegovina-Neretva
- Municipality: City of Mostar

Area
  - Total: 3.12 sq mi (8.07 km^{2})

Population (2013)
  - Total: 1,573
  - Density: 505/sq mi (195/km^{2})
- Time zone: UTC+1 (CET)
  - Summer (DST): UTC+2 (CEST)
- Postal code: 88000

Jasenica is a populated settlement in the Mostar municipality, just south of the city of Mostar. It is 8 km (5.0 mi) from Mostar, 136 km (85 mi) from Sarajevo, 131 km (81 mi) from Dubrovnik and 165 km (103 mi) from Split.

== Demographics ==
According to the 2013 census, its population was 1,573.

Ethnicity in 2013
Ethnicity	Number	Percentage
Croats	1,367	86.9%
Bosniaks	188	12.0%
Serbs	6	0.4%
other/undeclared	12	0.8%
Total	1,573	100%
