= Photography in Serbia =

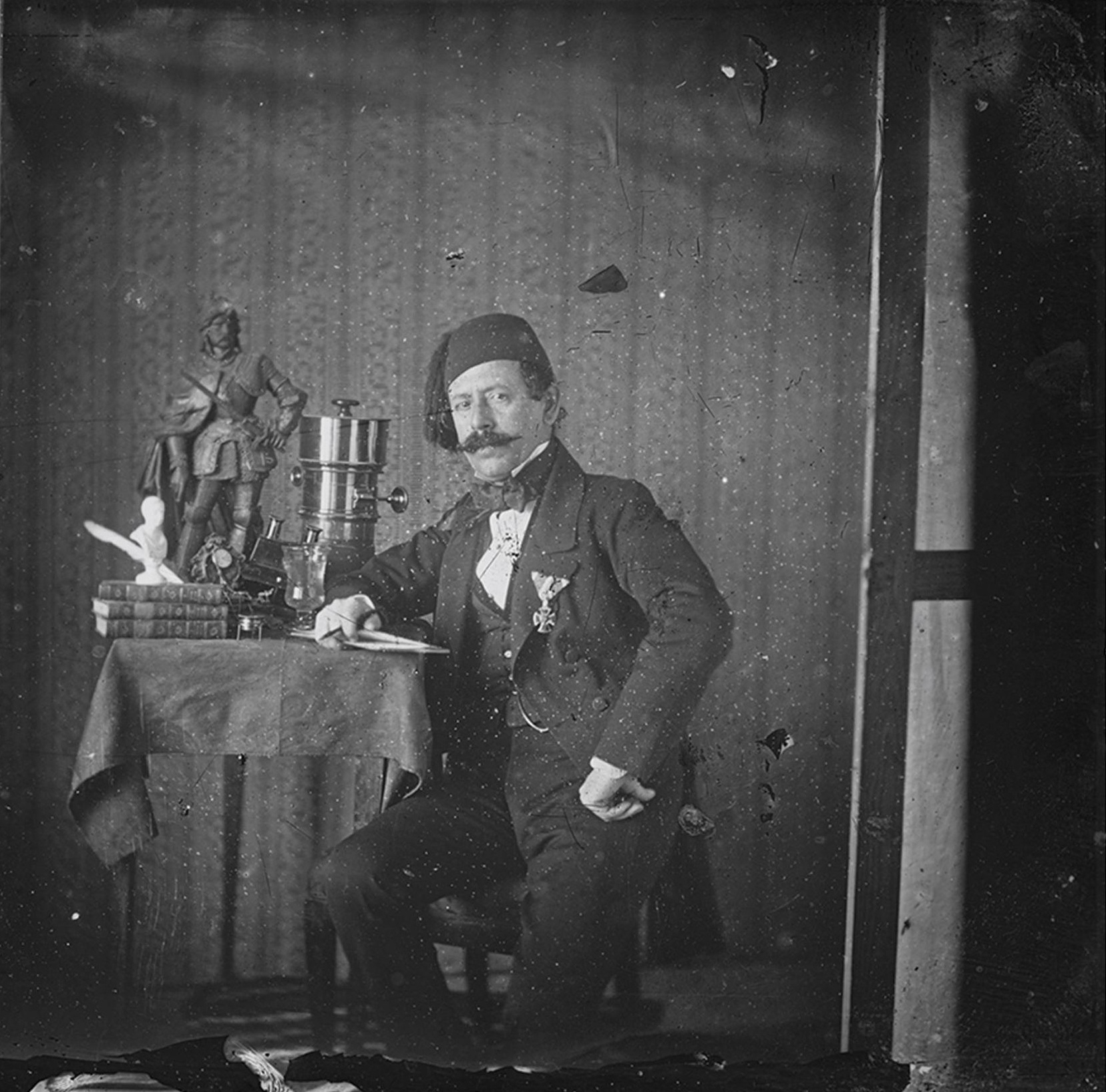
Anastas Jovanović (self-portrait)

Photography in Serbia has its beginning in the mid-19th century, with the pioneer, regarded the first Serbian photographer, Anastas Jovanović (1817–1899).

Photography reached Serbian society soon after the medium's 1839 invention, and early practice was closely associated with Jovanović's Vienna training and portrait work. His portraits have been presented as evidence of Serbian social, political and cultural life in the 19th century.

== History ==
Photography appeared in Serbian society soon after it was invented in 1839. Jovanović studied lithography and graphics in Vienna, acquired a Voigtländer camera, and made portraits of prominent Serbs. His photographic work began in the late 1840s; he took up paper photography in 1847 or 1848, and preserved portraits from about 1849–1850 are held in Belgrade collections.

== Sources ==
- Zoran Gluscevic (1995). "A century and half of photography in Serbia". The history of Serbian Culture. Rastko.
