= Gunjaci =

Gunjaci is the name of two areas:

- Gunjaci, a region in Bosnia-Herzegovina located in the municipality of Milići, Republika Srpska
- Gunjaci, an area of Serbia located in the municipality of Osečina, Kolubara
