= Konjic (disambiguation) =

Konjic is a municipality in Bosnia and Herzegovina.

Konjic also:

- Konjic (Osečina), village in Serbia
- Muhamed Konjić, Bosnian footballer
