= Konjic (Osečina) =

Konjic Коњиц
- Village
- Location within Serbia
- Coordinates: 44°17′N 19°33′E
- Country: Serbia
- District: Kolubara
- Municipality: Osečina
- Time zone: UTC+1 (CET)
  - Summer (DST): UTC+2 (CEST)

Konjic is a village located in Osečina Municipality, Kolubara District, Serbia.
