= Ostružanj =

- Village (Selo)
- Location within Serbia
- Coordinates: 44°20′N 19°34′E
- Country: Serbia
- District: Kolubara
- Municipality: Osečina
- Time zone: UTC+1 (CET)
  - Summer (DST): UTC+2 (CEST)

Ostružanj is a village located in Osečina Municipality, Kolubara District, Serbia.

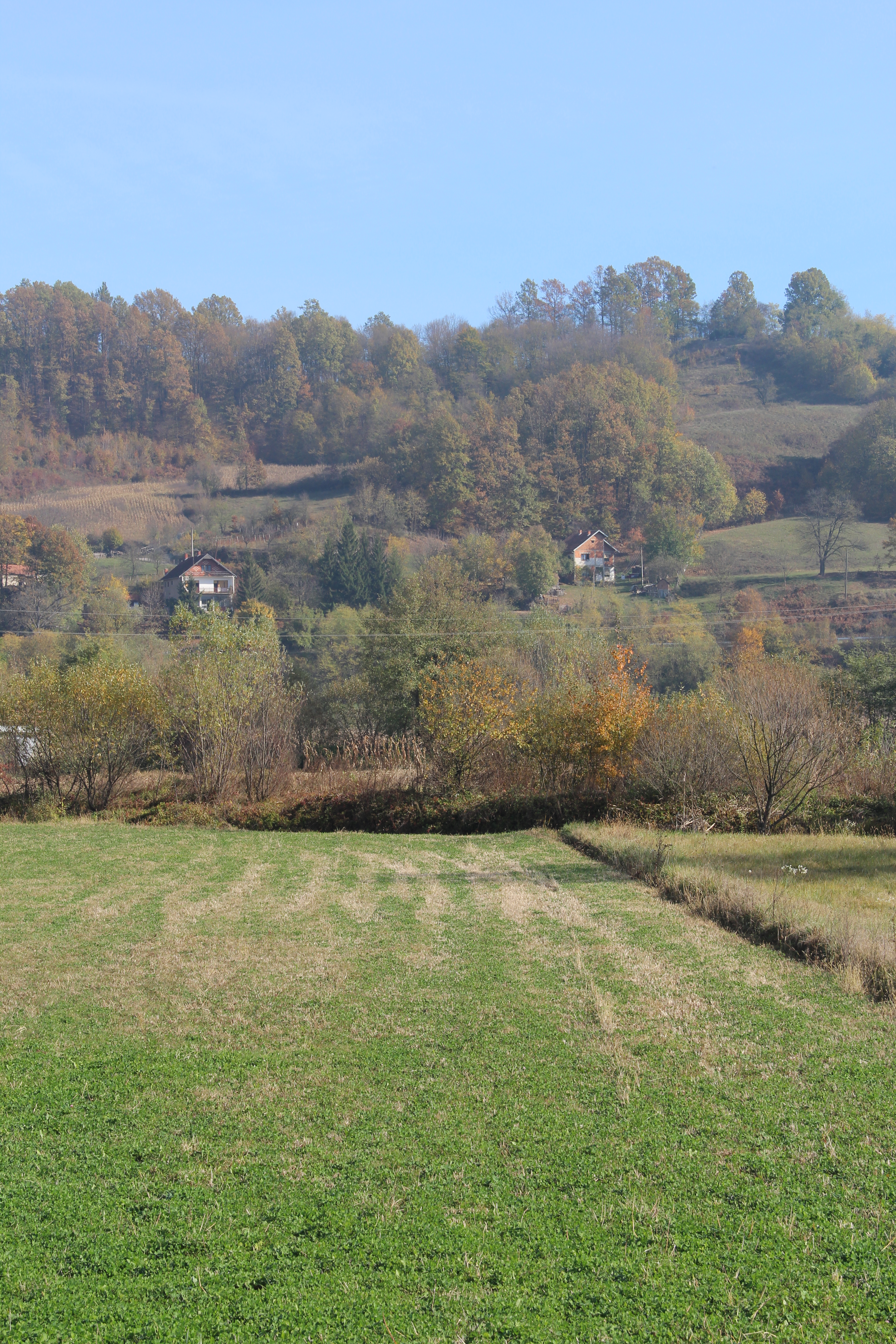
Ostružanj - panorama

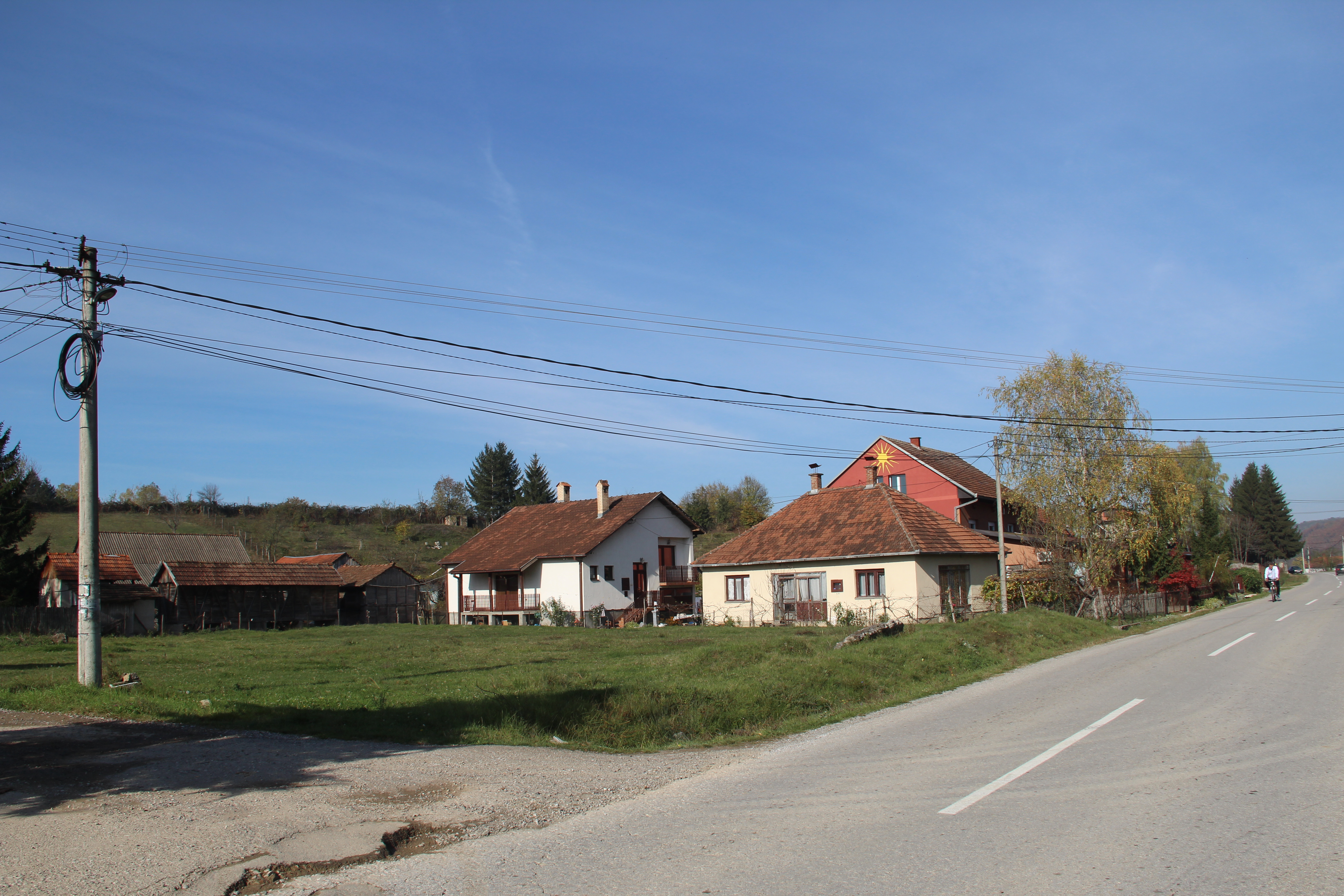
Ostružanj - panorama

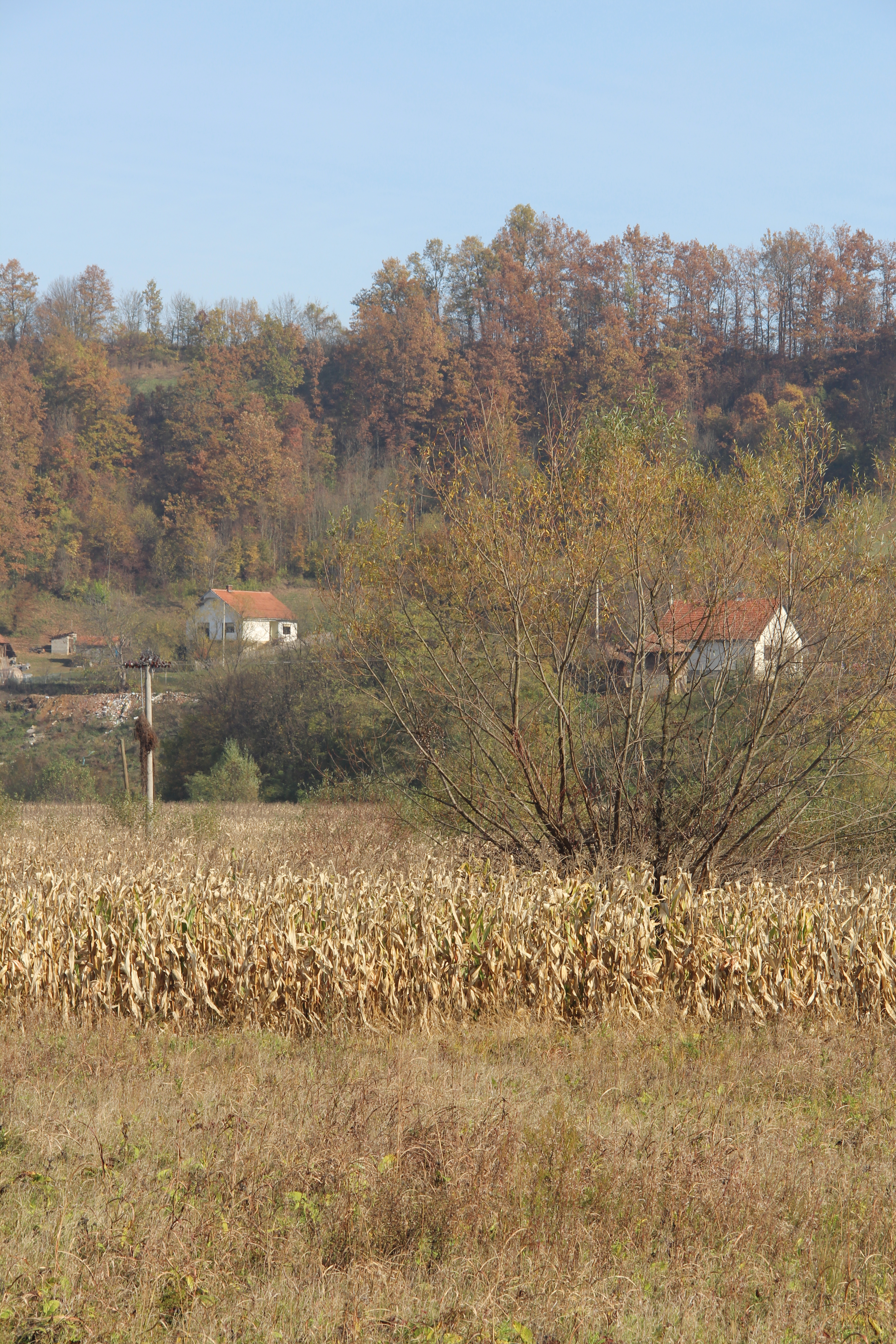
Ostružanj - panorama

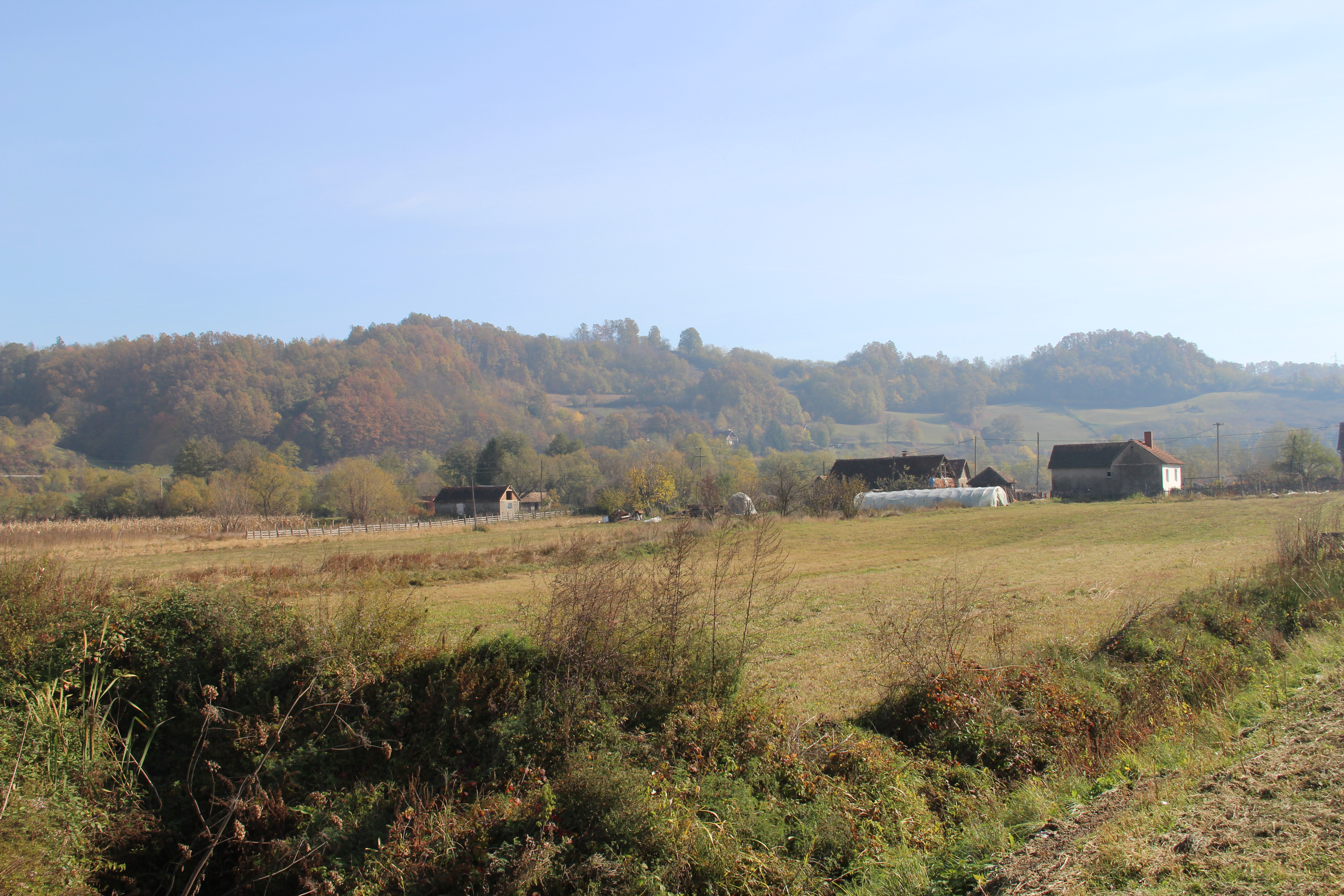
Ostružanj - panorama

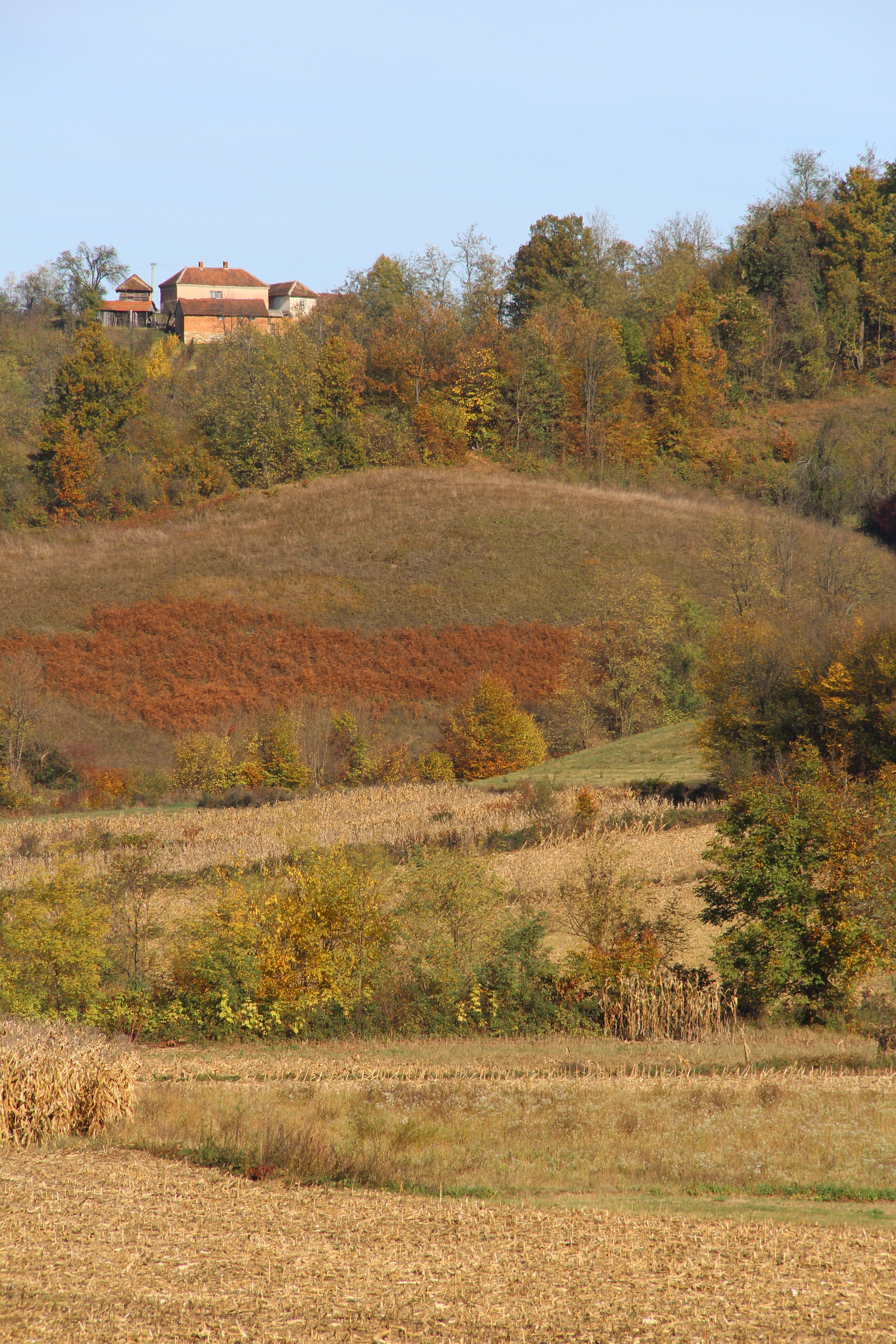
Ostružanj - panorama

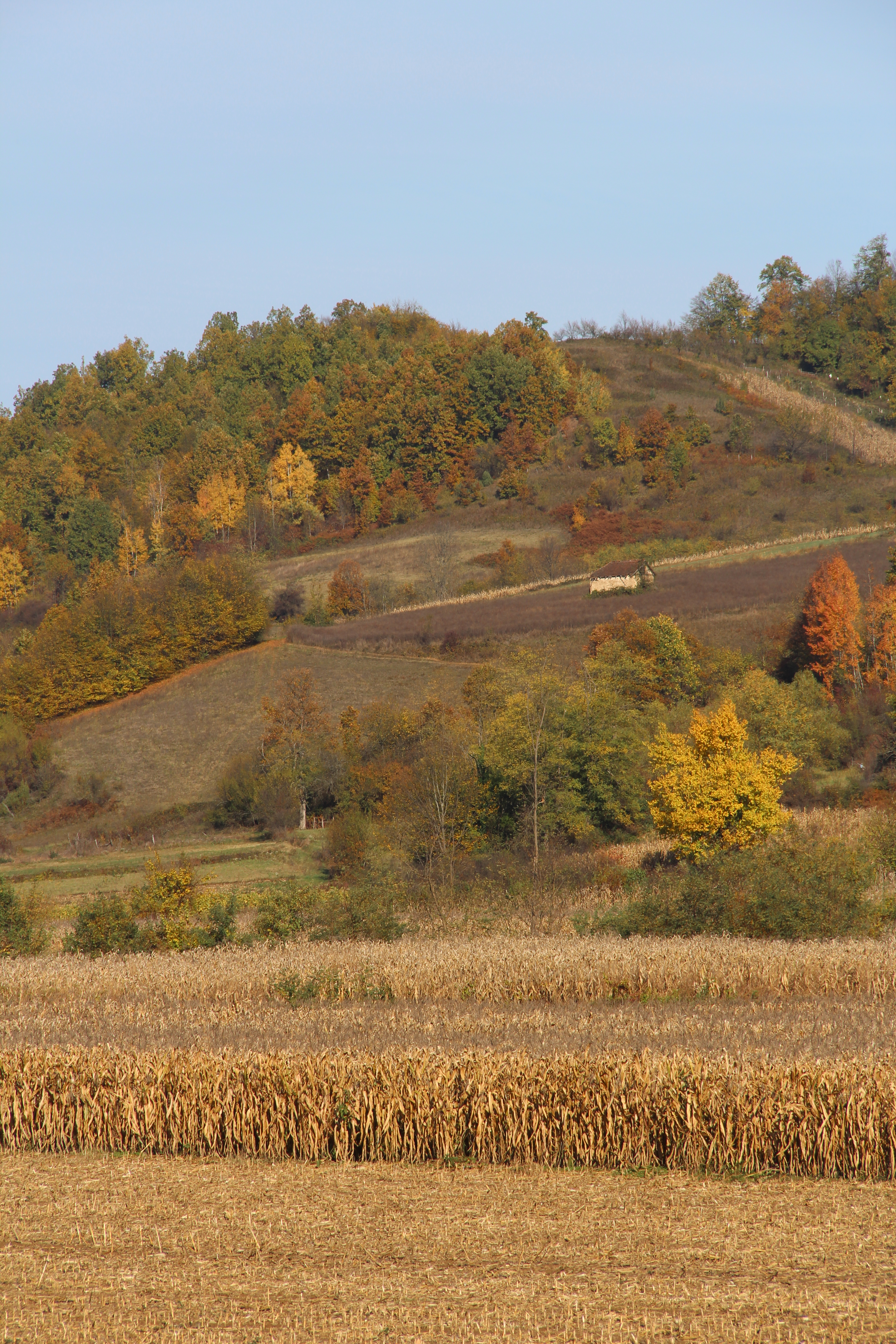
Ostružanj - panorama

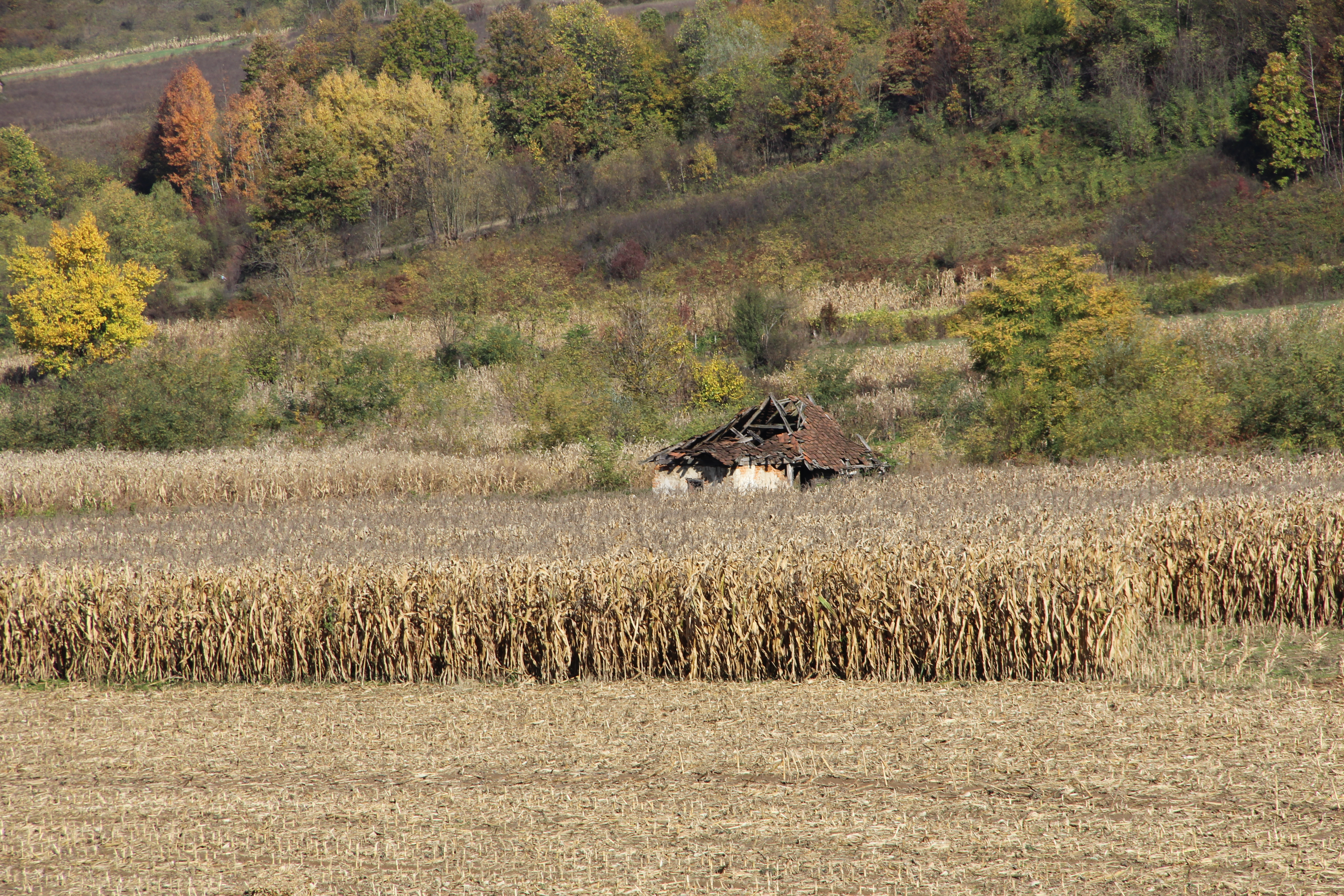
Ostružanj - panorama
