= Lopatanj =

Lopatanj Лопатањ
- Village (Selo)
- Location within Serbia
- Coordinates: 44°19′N 19°35′E
- Country: Serbia
- District: Kolubara
- Municipality: Osečina

Population (2011)
  - Total: ▼1,110
- Time zone: UTC+1 (CET)
  - Summer (DST): UTC+2 (CEST)
- Area code: 014

Lopatanj is a village located in Osečina Municipality, Kolubara District, Serbia.

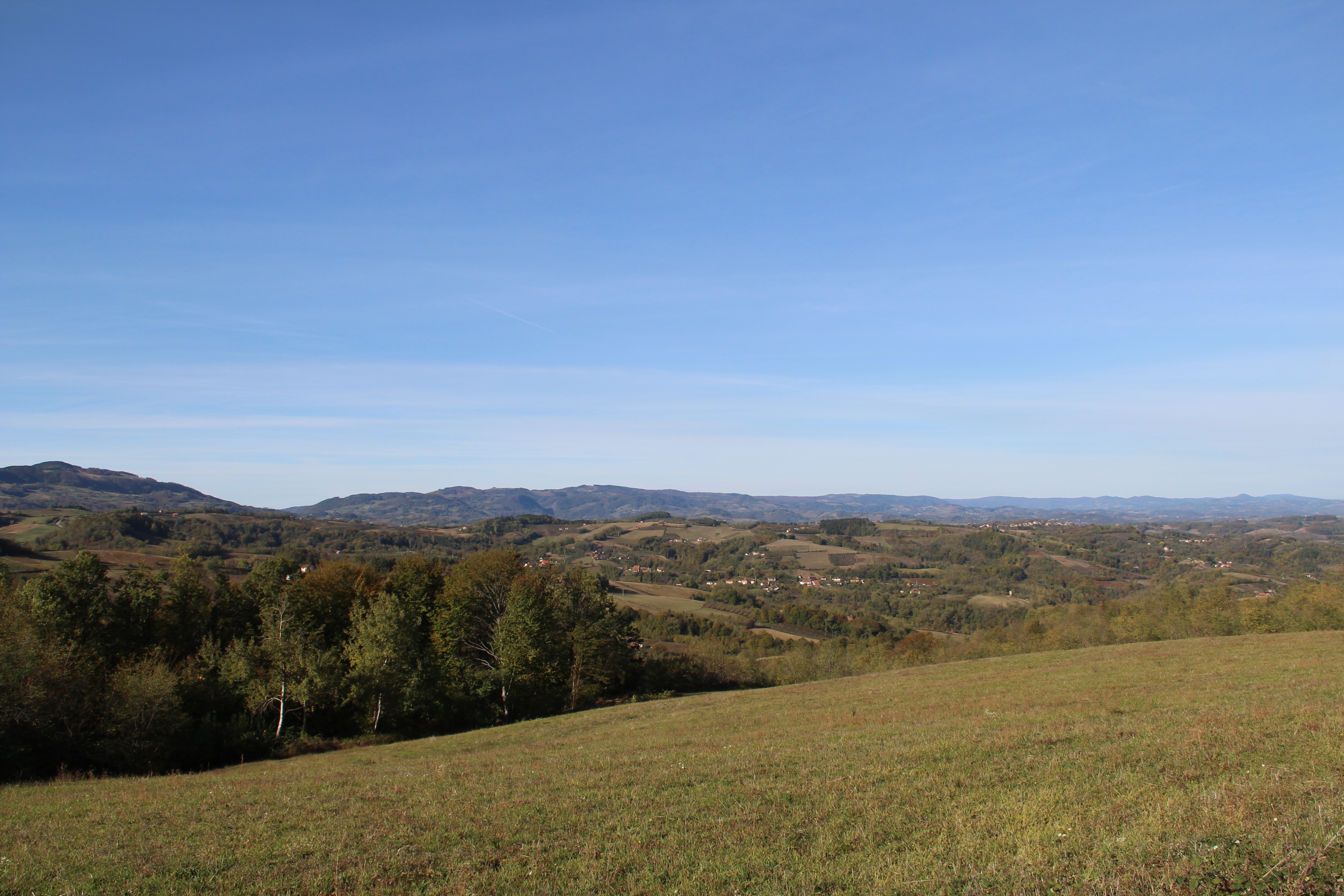
Lopatanj - panorama

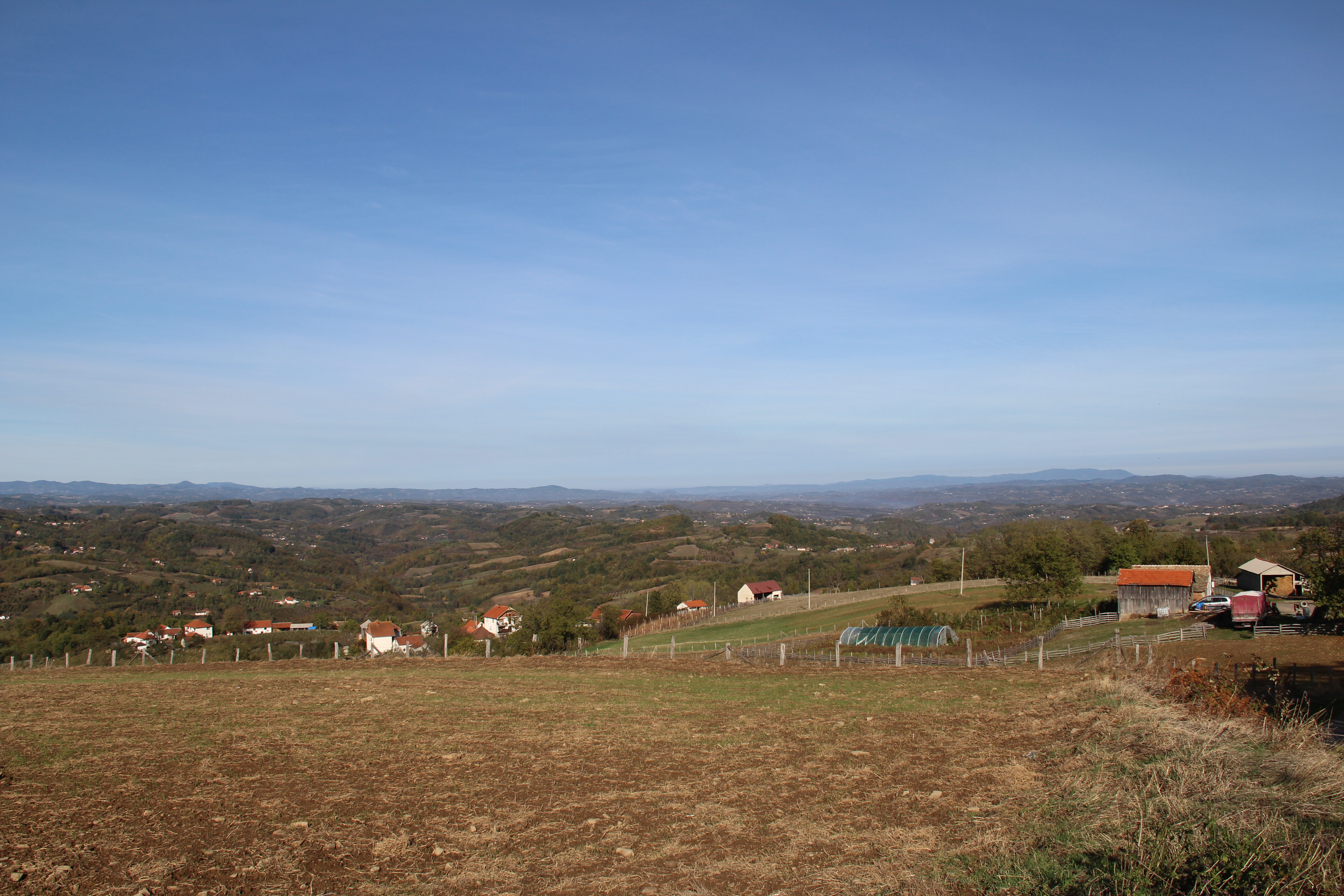
Lopatanj - panorama

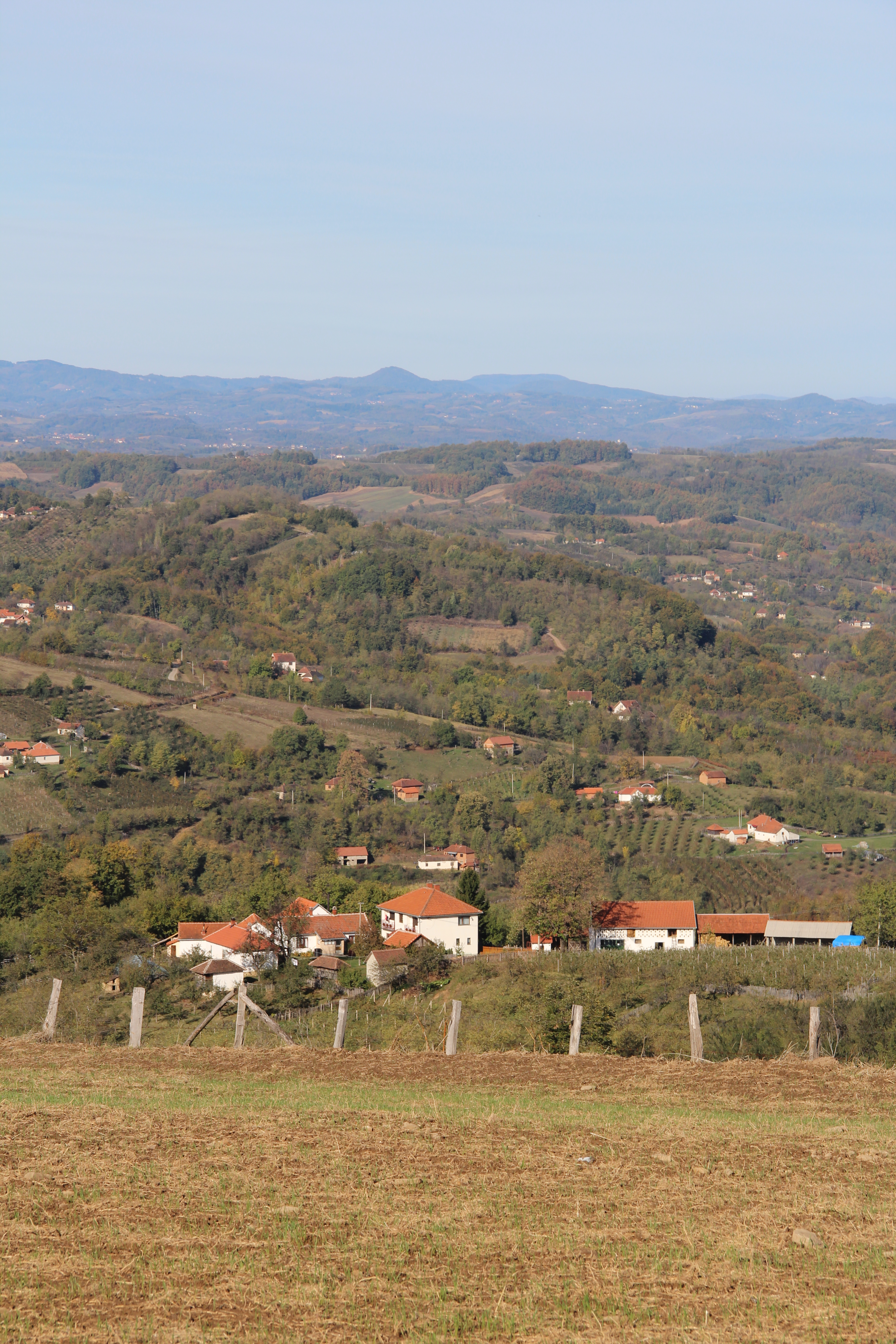
Lopatanj - panorama

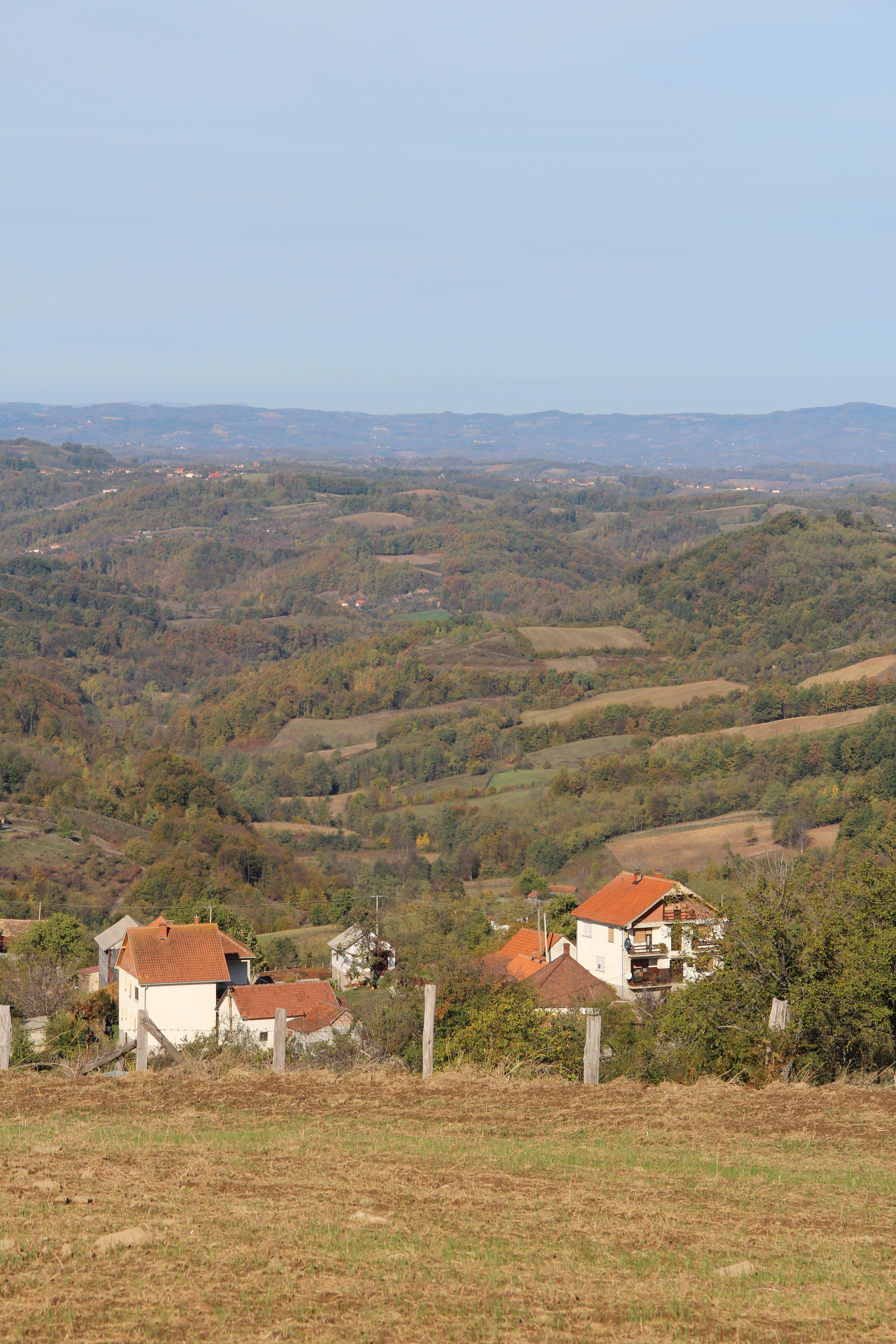
Lopatanj - panorama

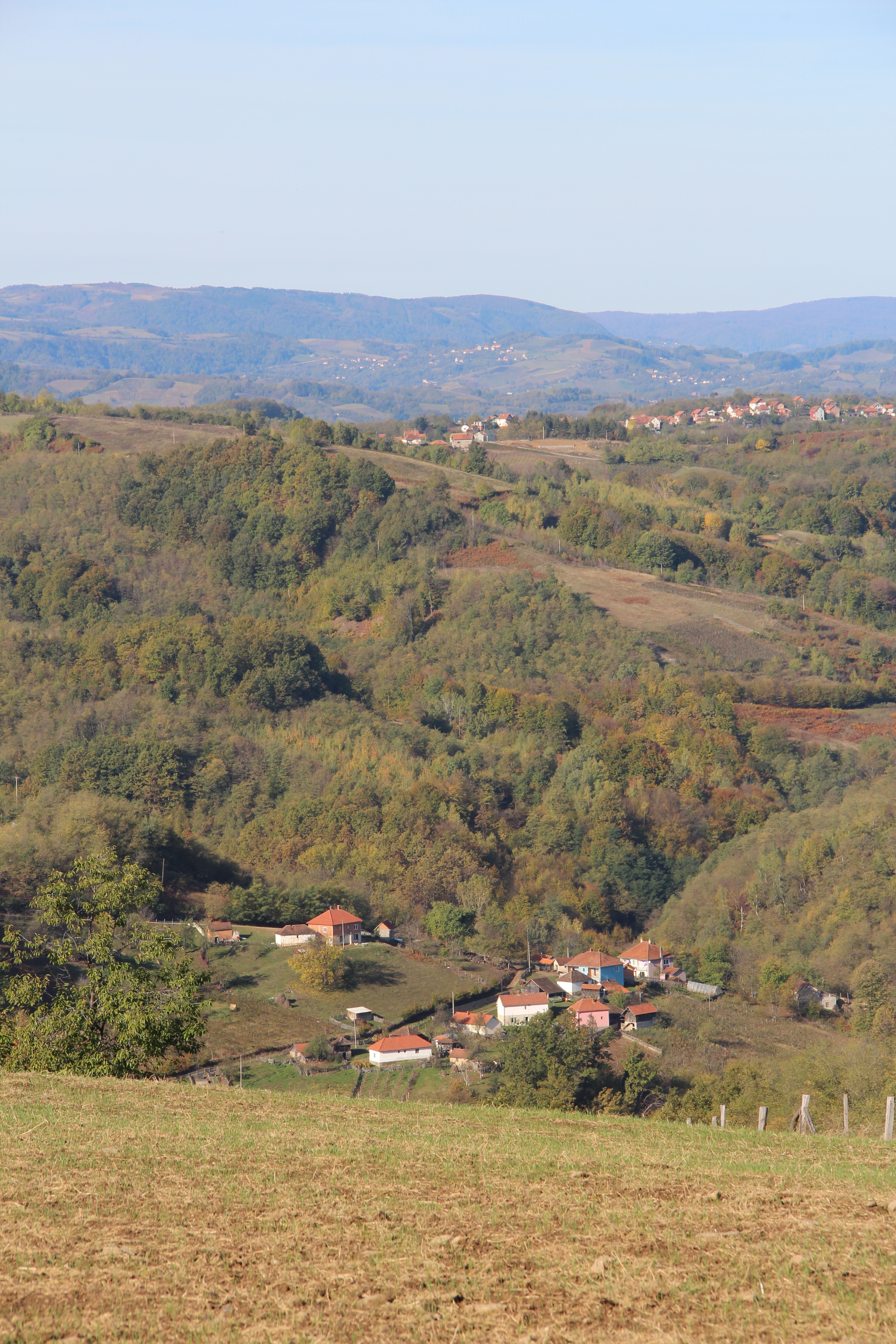
Lopatanj - panorama

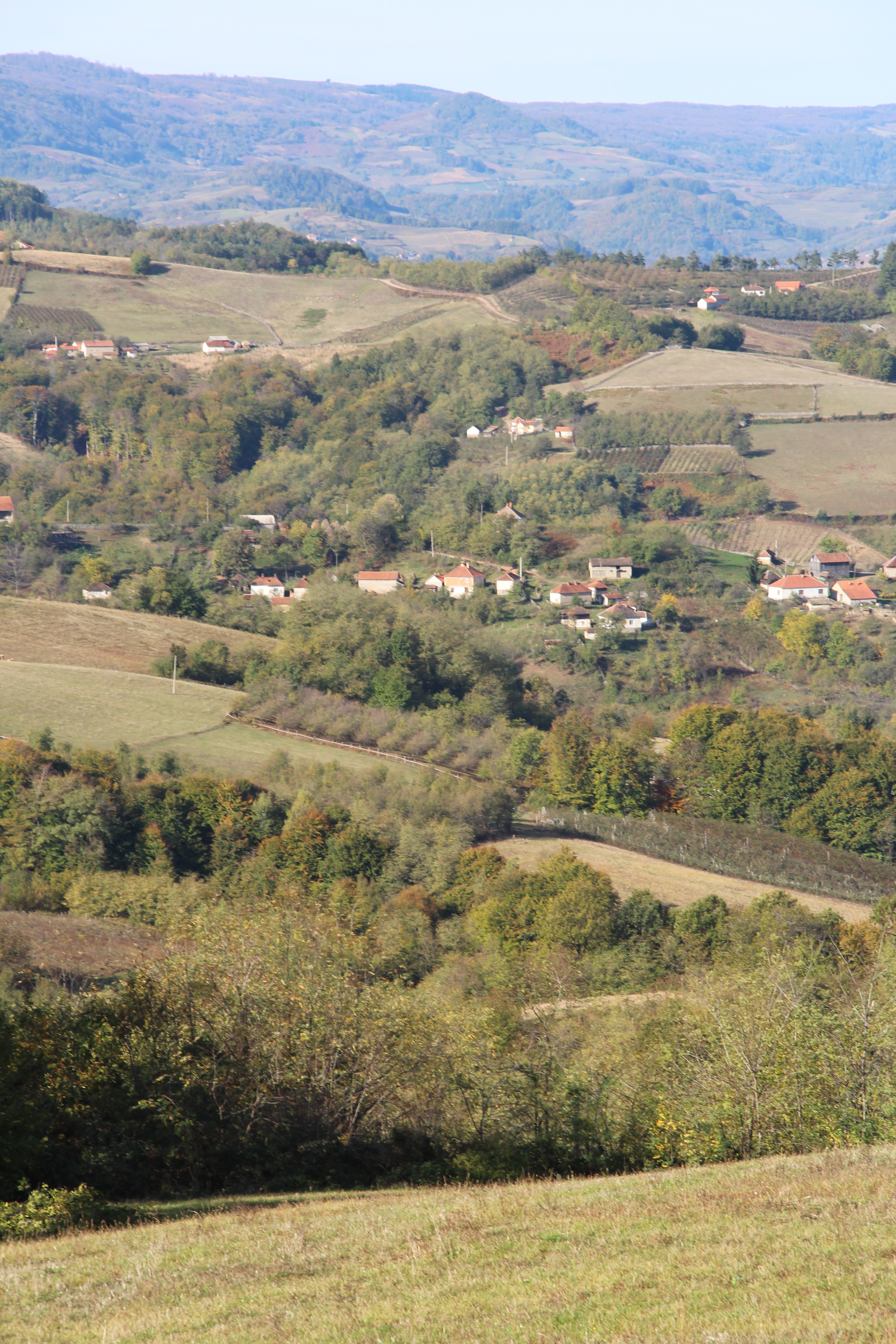
Lopatanj - panorama

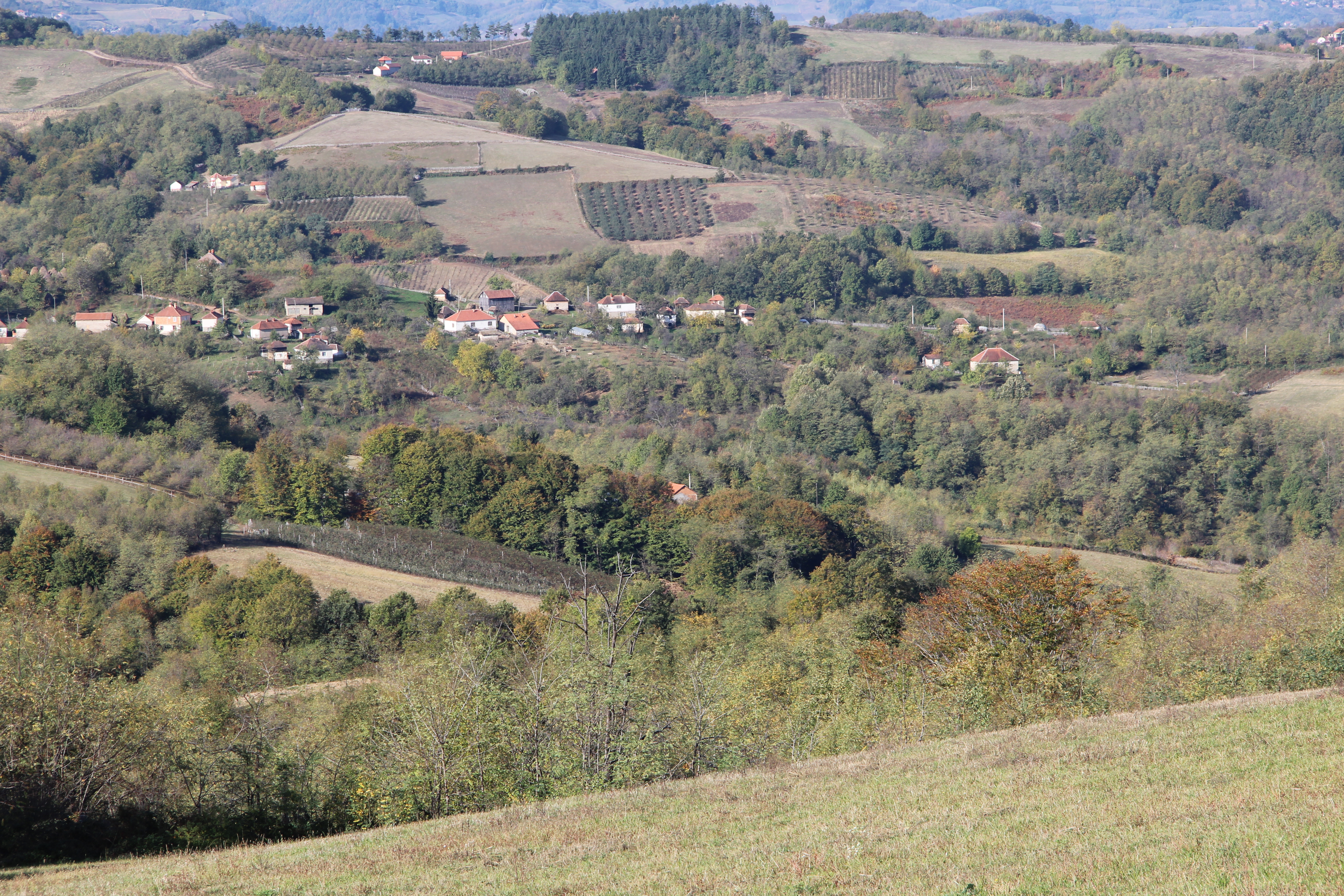
Lopatanj - panorama

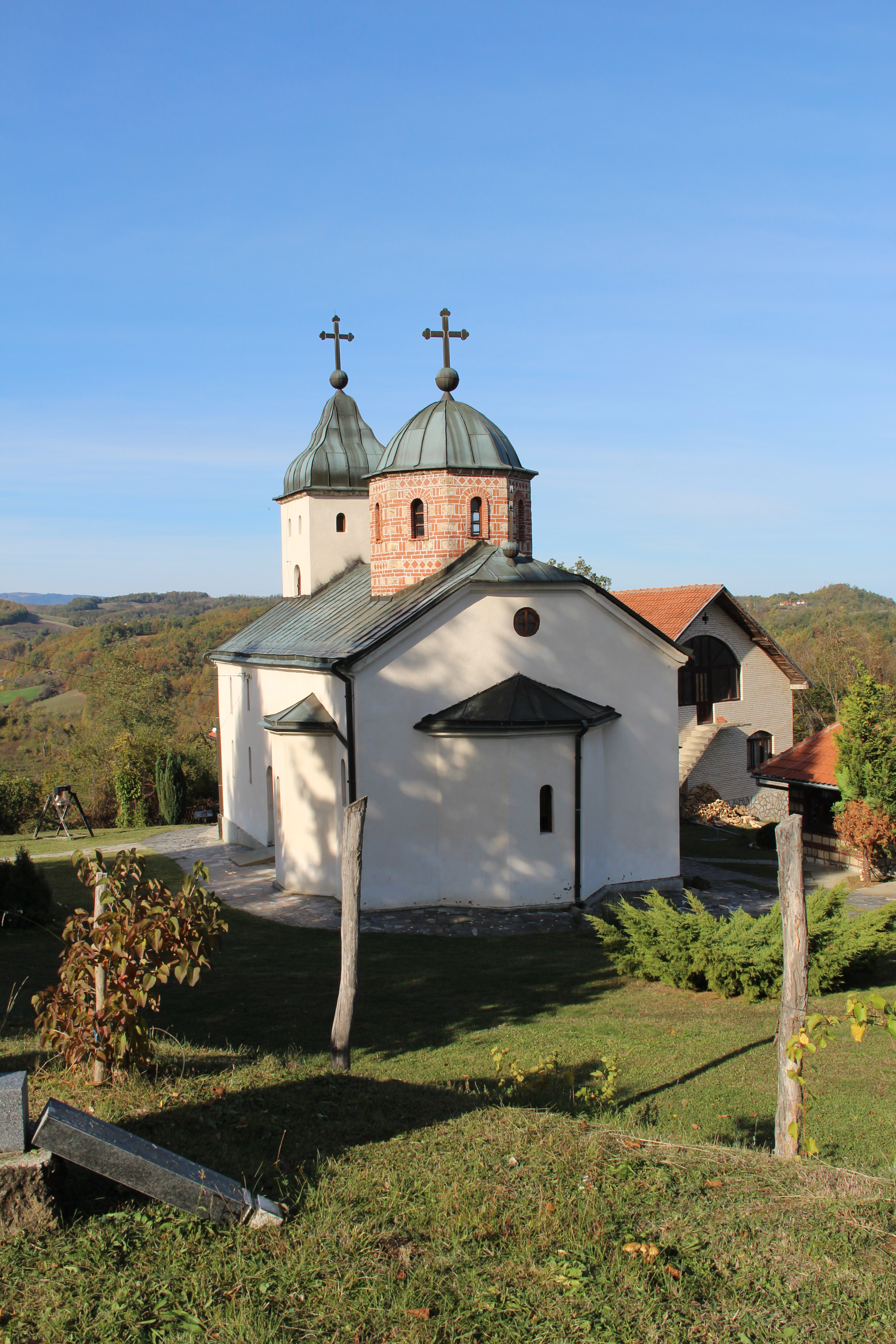
Lopatanj - church St. Luke

== Demographics ==
There are 1081 adult residents in the settlement of Lopatanj. The average age of the residents is 42.8 years (41.0 for men and 44.9 for women). The village has 385 households, the average number of residents per household is 3.45. The village is largely inhabited by Serbs (according to 2002 census), the last three censuses noticed a decline in the population.

Changes in population during 20th Century
