= Bastav =

- Village (Selo)
- Location within Serbia
- Coordinates: 44°22′N 19°30′E
- Country: Serbia
- District: Kolubara
- Municipality: Osečina
- Time zone: UTC+1 (CET)
  - Summer (DST): UTC+2 (CEST)

Bastav (Serbian: Бастав) is a village located in Osečina Municipality, Kolubara District, Serbia.
