= Osečina =

Osečina Осечина (Serbian)
- Town and municipality
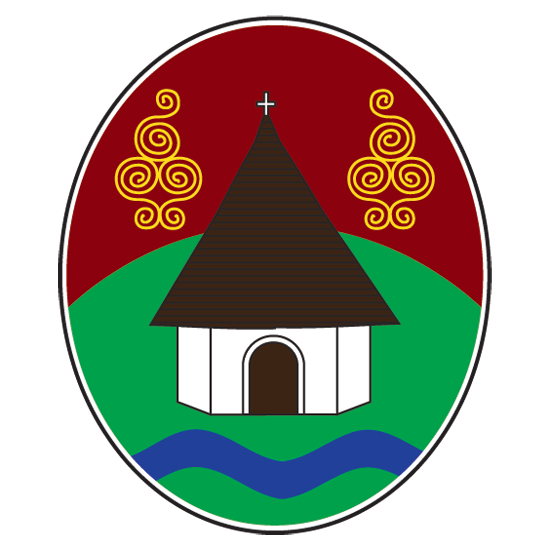
- Coat of arms

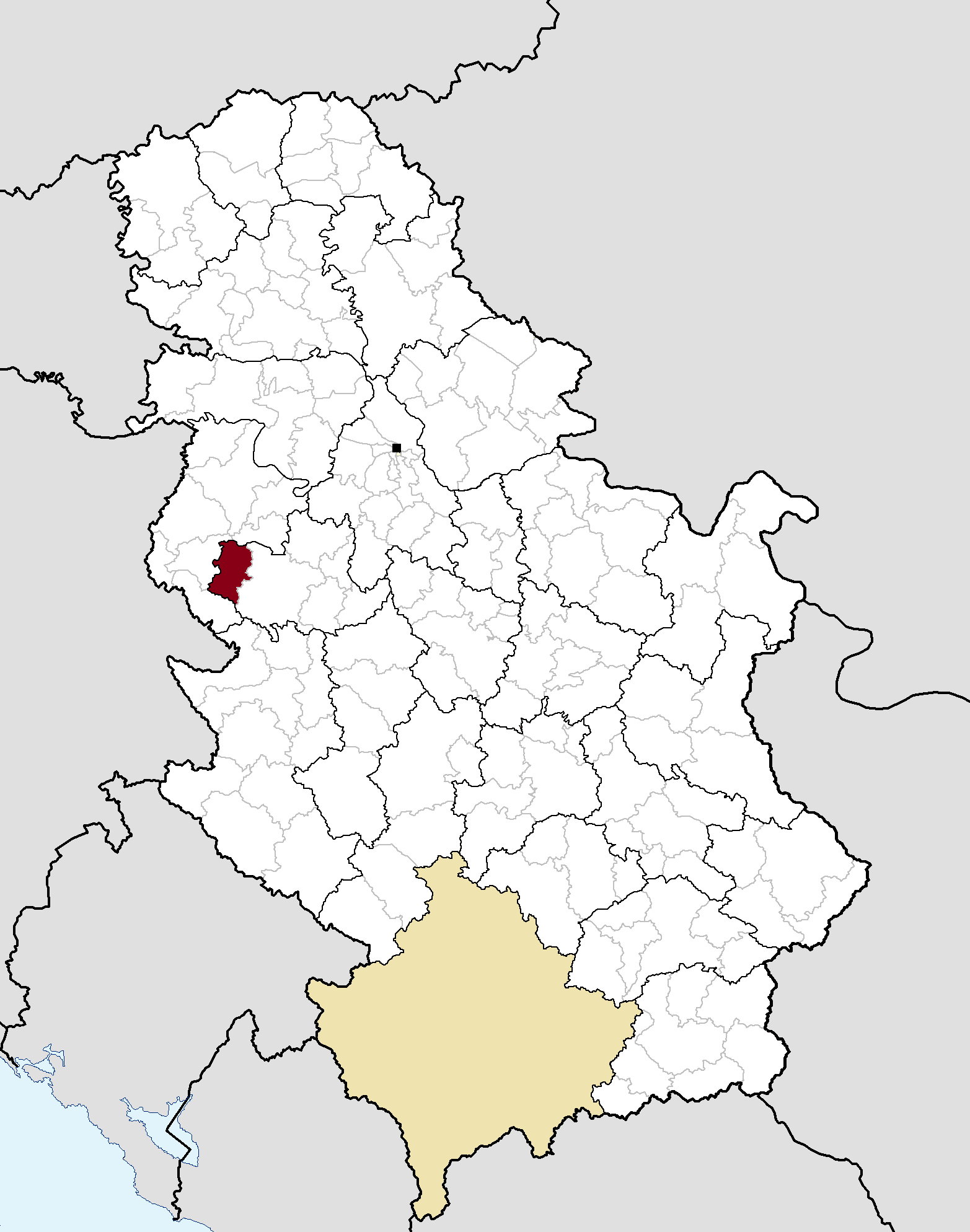
- Location of the municipality of Osečina within Serbia
- Coordinates: 44°22′N 19°36′E
- Country: Serbia
- Region: Šumadija and Western Serbia
- District: Kolubara
- Settlements: 20

Government
  - Mayor: Nikola Tomić (SNS)

Area
  - Town: 3.43 km^{2} (1.32 sq mi)
  - Municipality: 319 km^{2} (123 sq mi)
- Elevation: 201 m (659 ft)

Population (2022 census)
  - Town: 2,456
  - Town density: 716/km^{2} (1,850/sq mi)
  - Municipality: 9,951
  - Municipality density: 31.2/km^{2} (80.8/sq mi)
- Time zone: UTC+1 (CET)
  - Summer (DST): UTC+2 (CEST)
- Postal code: 14253
- Area code: +381(0)14
- Car plates: VA
- Website: www.osecina.com

Osečina (Serbian Cyrillic: Осечина, pronounced [ɔsɛ̌tʃina]) is a town and municipality located in the Kolubara District of western Serbia. As of 2022, the population of the town is 2,456, while population of the municipality is 9,951 inhabitants.

== Settlements ==
Apart from the town of Osečina, the municipality consists of the following villages:

- Bastav
- Belotić
- Bratačić
- Carina
- Dragijevica
- Dragodol
- Gornje Crniljevo
- Gunjaci
- Komirić
- Konjic
- Konjuša
- Lopatanj
- Osečina (village)
- Ostružanj
- Pecka
- Plužac
- Sirdija
- Skadar
- Tuđin

== Demographics ==
Historical population
Year	Pop.	±% p.a.
1948	23,076	—
1953	23,108	+0.03%
1961	21,803	−0.72%
1971	19,832	−0.94%
1981	18,519	−0.68%
1991	16,745	−1.00%
2002	15,135	−0.91%
2011	12,536	−2.07%
2022	9,951	−2.08%

According to the 2011 census results, the municipality of Osečina has 12,536 inhabitants.

=== Ethnic groups ===
The ethnic composition of the municipality:

Ethnic group	Population	%
Serbs	12,093	96.47%
Roma	228	1.82%
Macedonians	7	0.06%
Croats	6	0.05%
Yugoslavs	6	0.05%
Others	196	1.56%
Total	12,536	

== Economy ==
The following table gives a preview of total number of employed people per their core activity (as of 2017):

Activity	Total
Agriculture, forestry and fishing	15
Mining	-
Processing industry	729
Distribution of power, gas and water	18
Distribution of water and water waste management	48
Construction	95
Wholesale and retail, repair	244
Traffic, storage and communication	42
Hotels and restaurants	48
Media and telecommunications	11
Finance and insurance	9
Property stock and charter	-
Professional, scientific, innovative and technical activities	38
Administrative and other services	11
Administration and social assurance	131
Education	190
Healthcare and social work	70
Art, leisure and recreation	22
Other services	25
Total	1,747

== Gallery ==
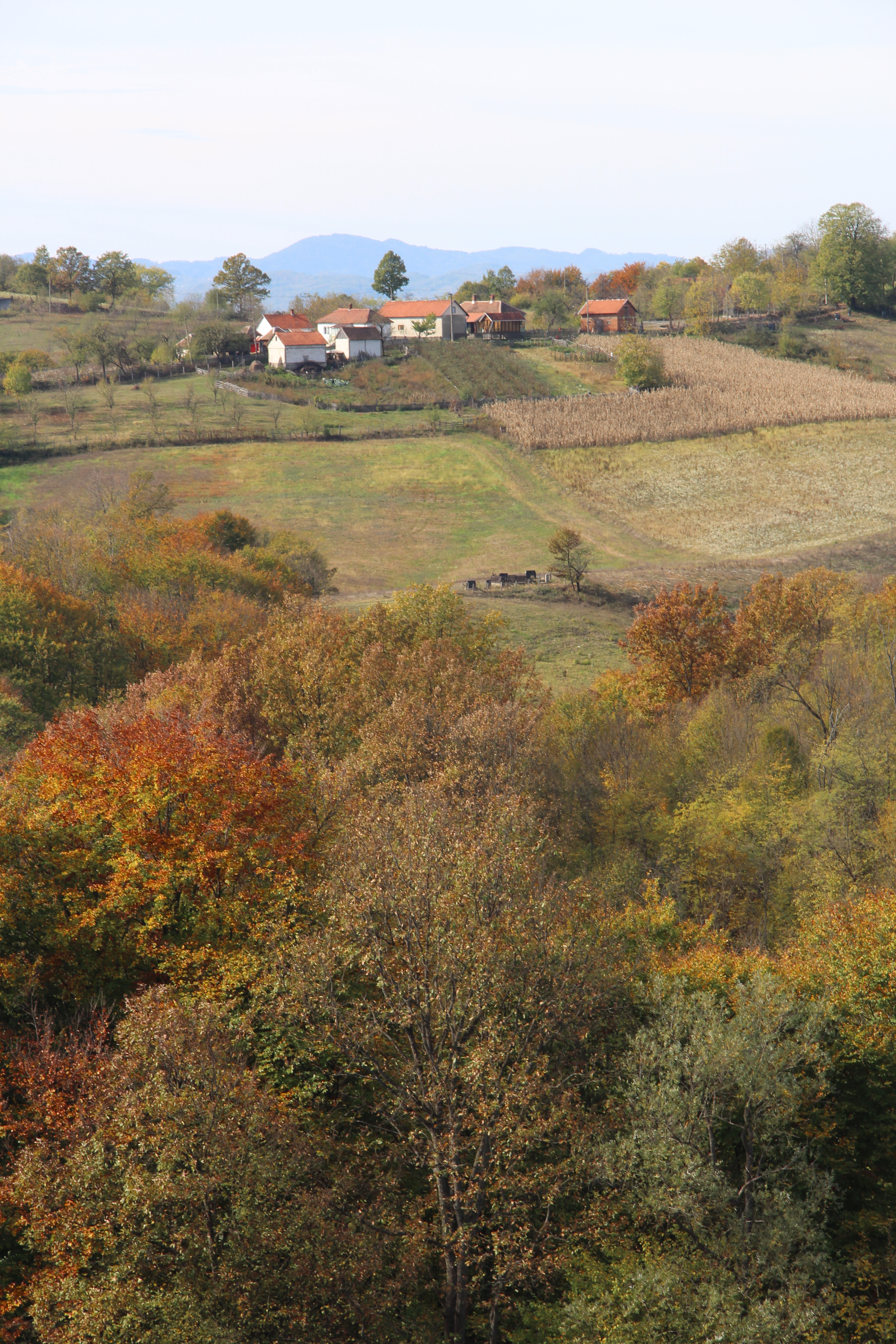
Village Osečina

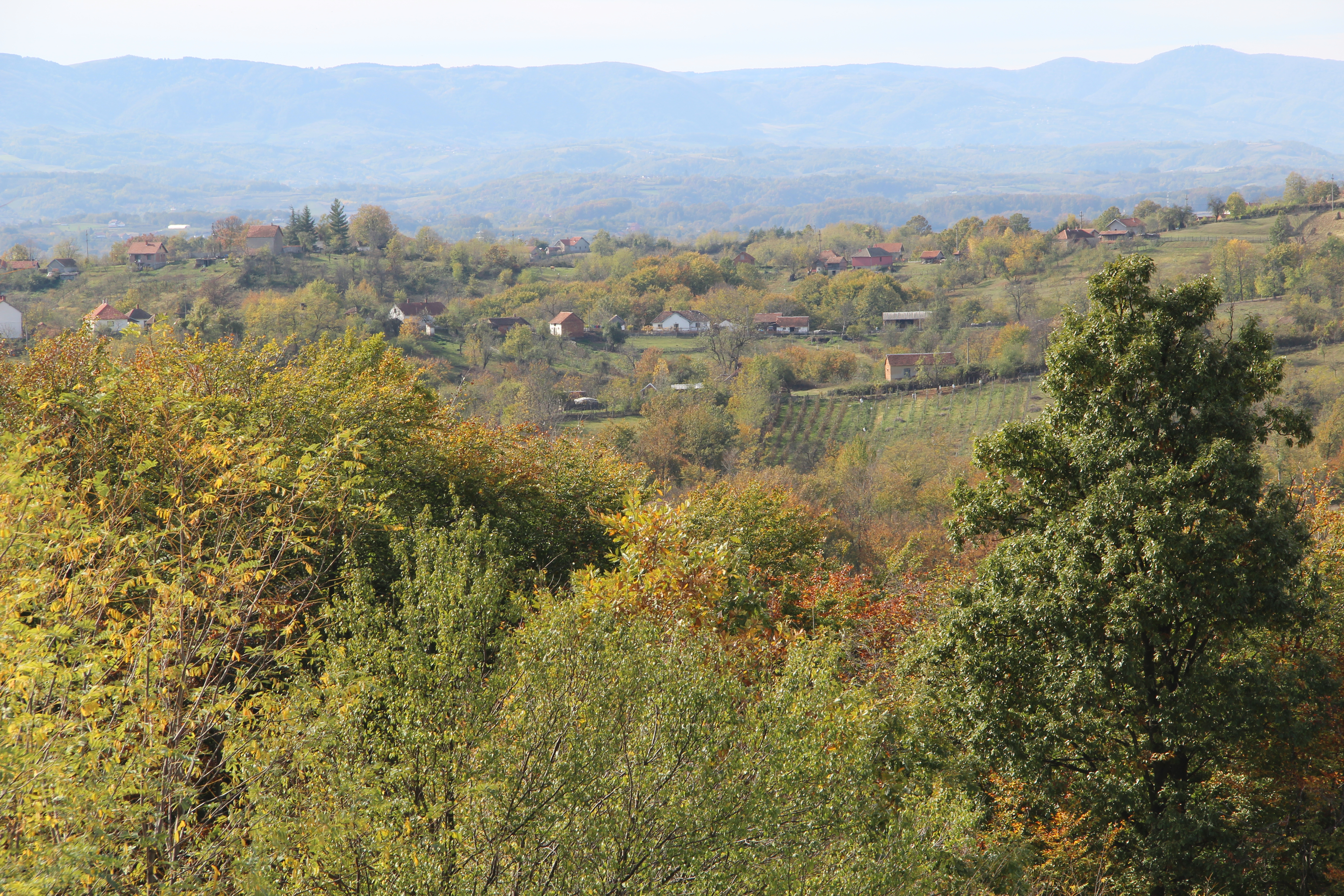
Village Osečina

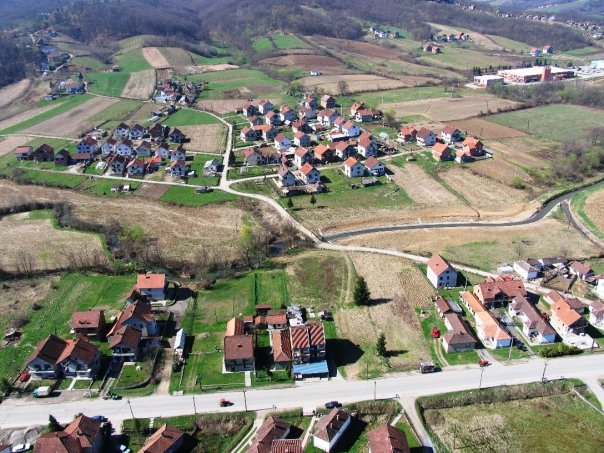
Settlement in Osečina

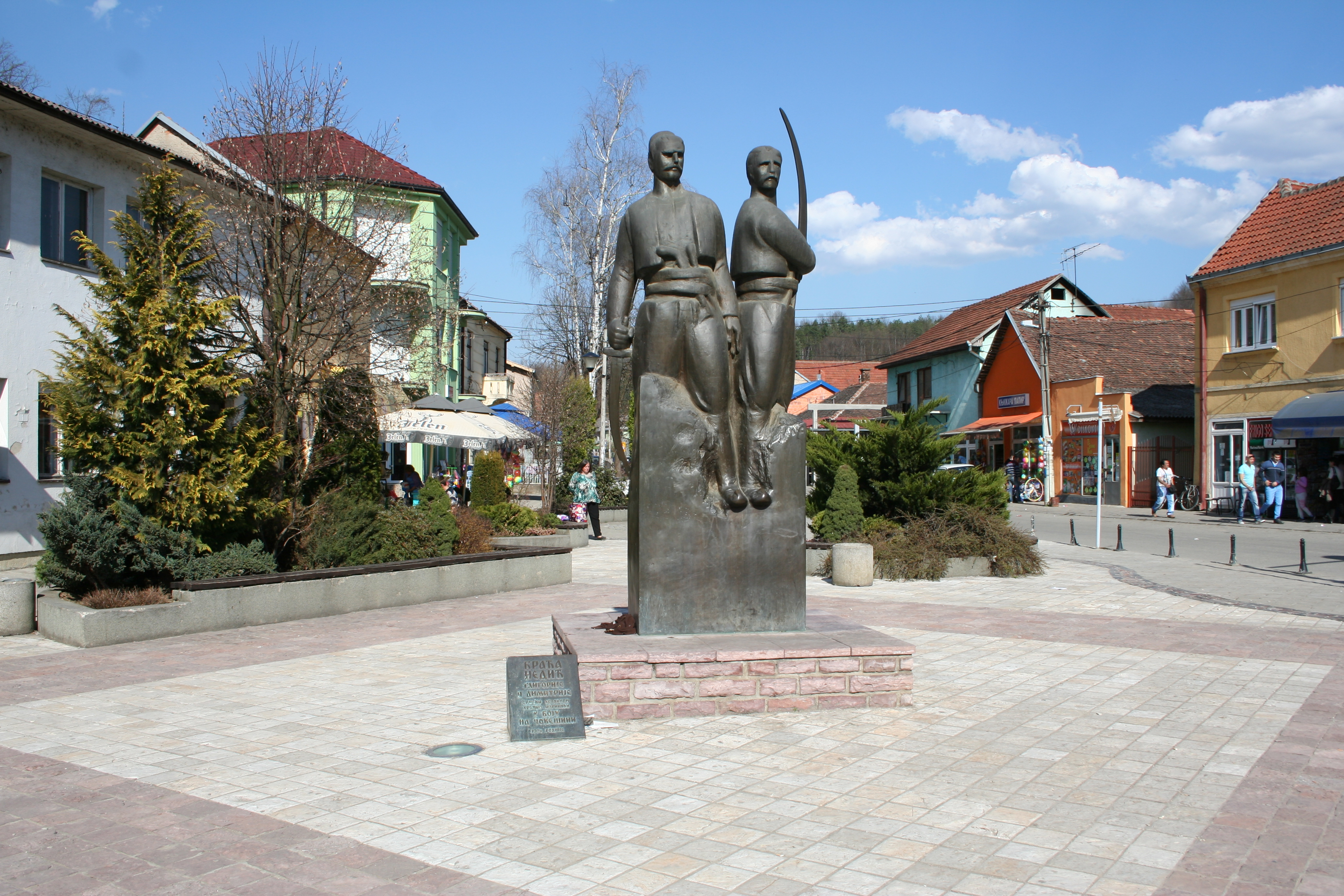
Monument dedicated to Nedić brothers who fought in the First Serbian Uprising

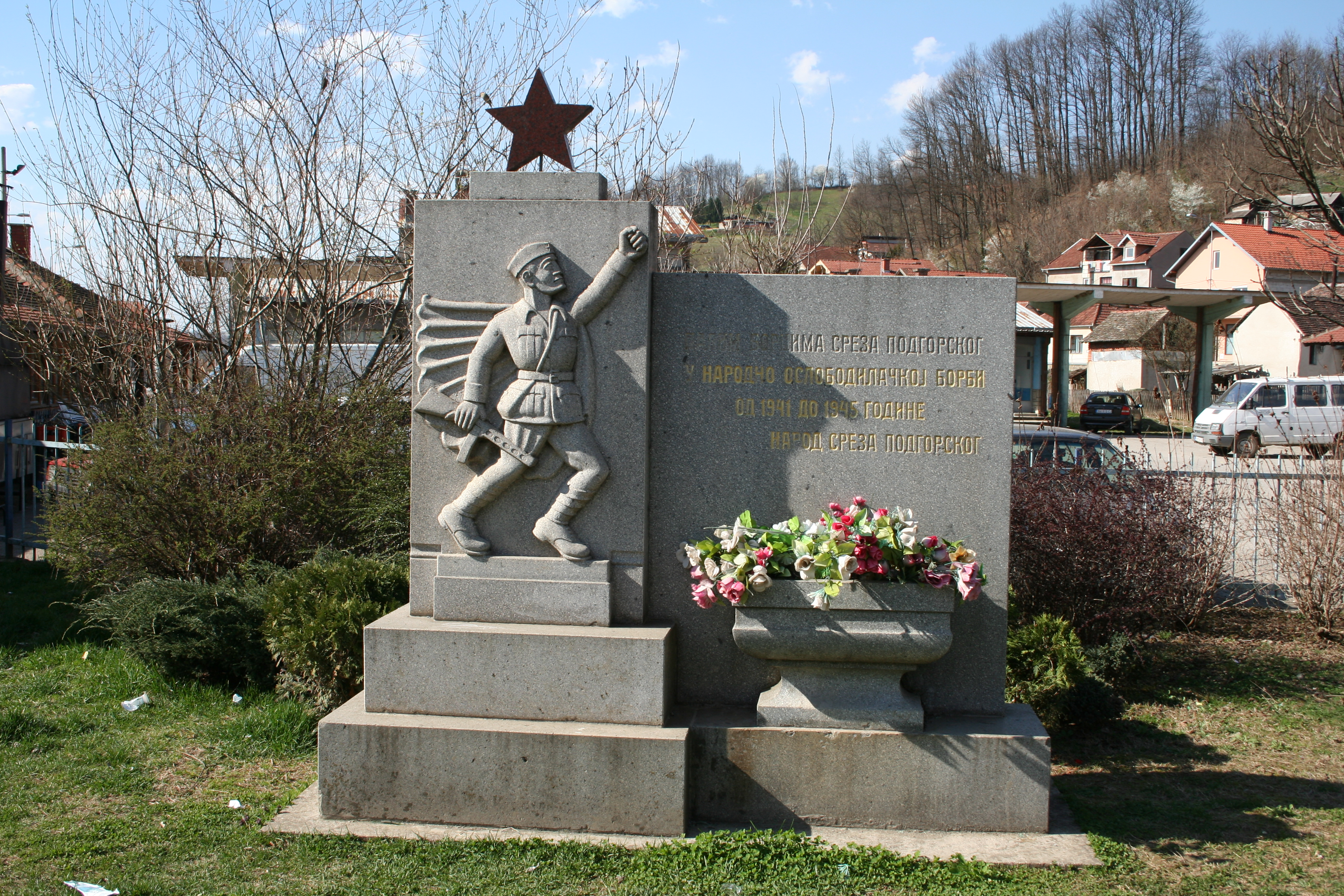
Monument dedicated to WWII fighters
